= Jainism in Haryana =

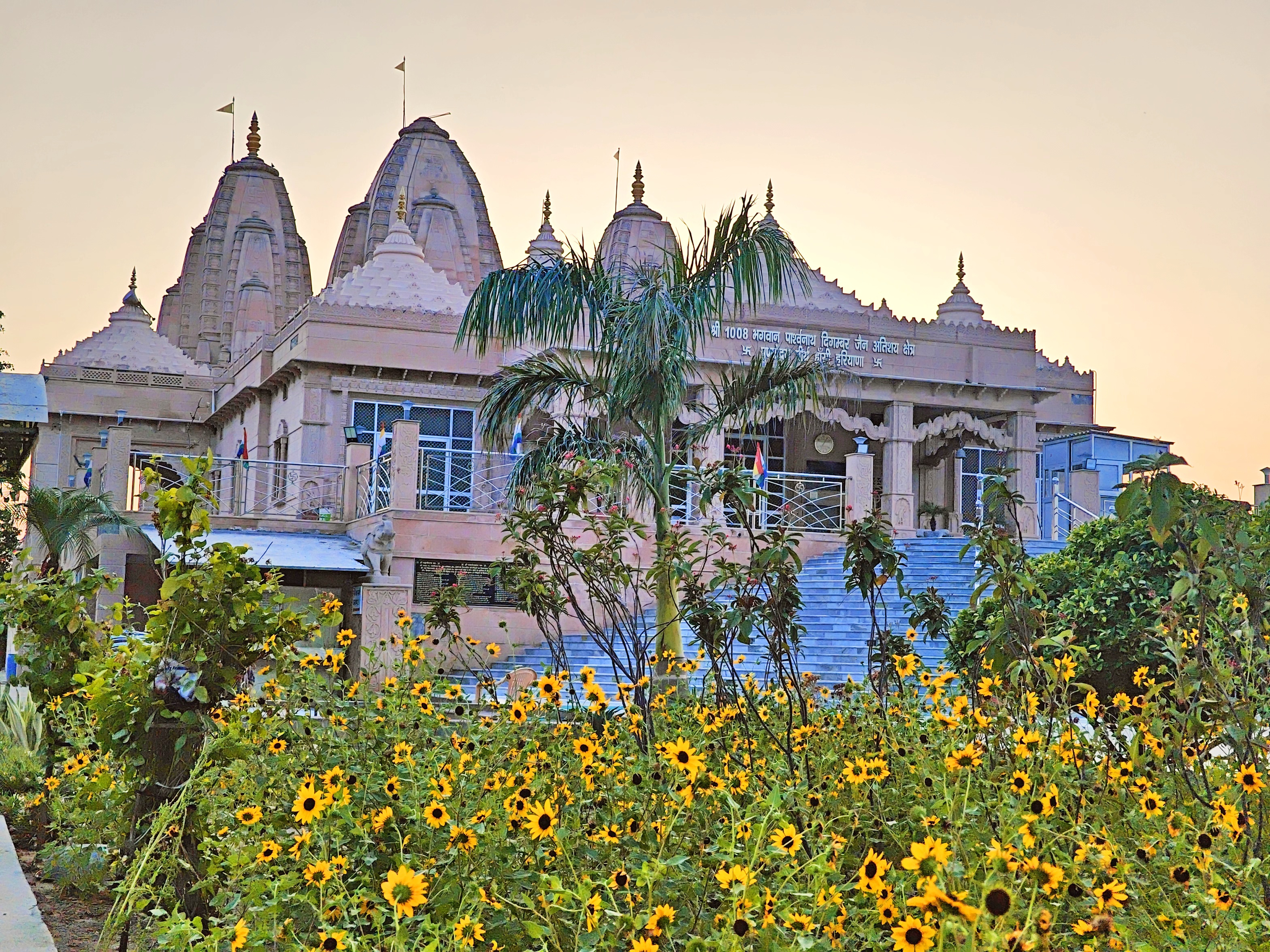
Punyodaya Tirth

Ancient idols of Jain Tirthankara (made of bronze and stone) were found in archaeological expeditions in Badli, Bhiwani (Ranila, Charkhi Dadri, Badhara village), Dadri, Gurgaon (Ferozepur Jhirka), Hansi, Hisar (Agroha), Kasan, Nahad, Narnaul, Pehowa, Rewari, Rohad, Rohtak (Asthal Bohar) and Sonepat in Haryana. Agrawal Jain community traces its origins from Hisar. Guptisagar Dham Tirtha at Ganaur is a religious tourist spot in Haryana. It is named after the Jain Acharya Guptisagar.

== History ==
Agroha region came under influence of Jainism during Acharya Bhadrabahu. Rohtak was an important Jain center as Lord Mahavira paid many visits to this district. Ancient Tirthankara idols and Jain temples were also found in the vicinity of Khokhra-kot, belonging to Rajput-era.

Hansi hoard is a hoard of 58 bronze images of Jain Tirthankaras dating back to the 8th—-9th century excavated from Asigarh Fort in Hansi in Hisar district.

== Demographics ==
Jain population in Haryana as per Census 2001 was 57,167 (29,914 males and 27,253 females). This count decrease to 52,613 (27,358 males and 25,255 females) in 2011 Census.

== Temples ==
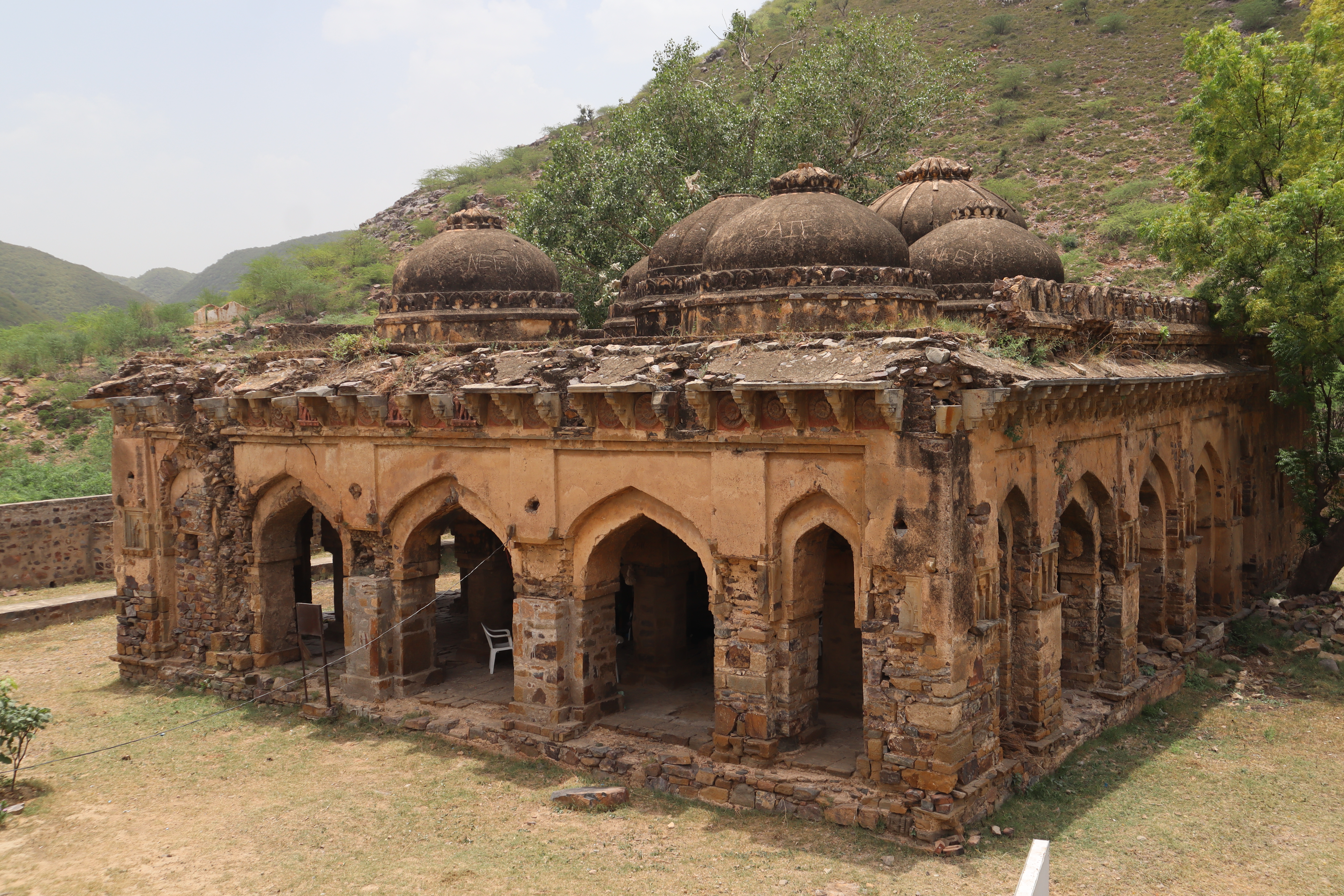
Dehra Temple is a protected monument of Harayana state.

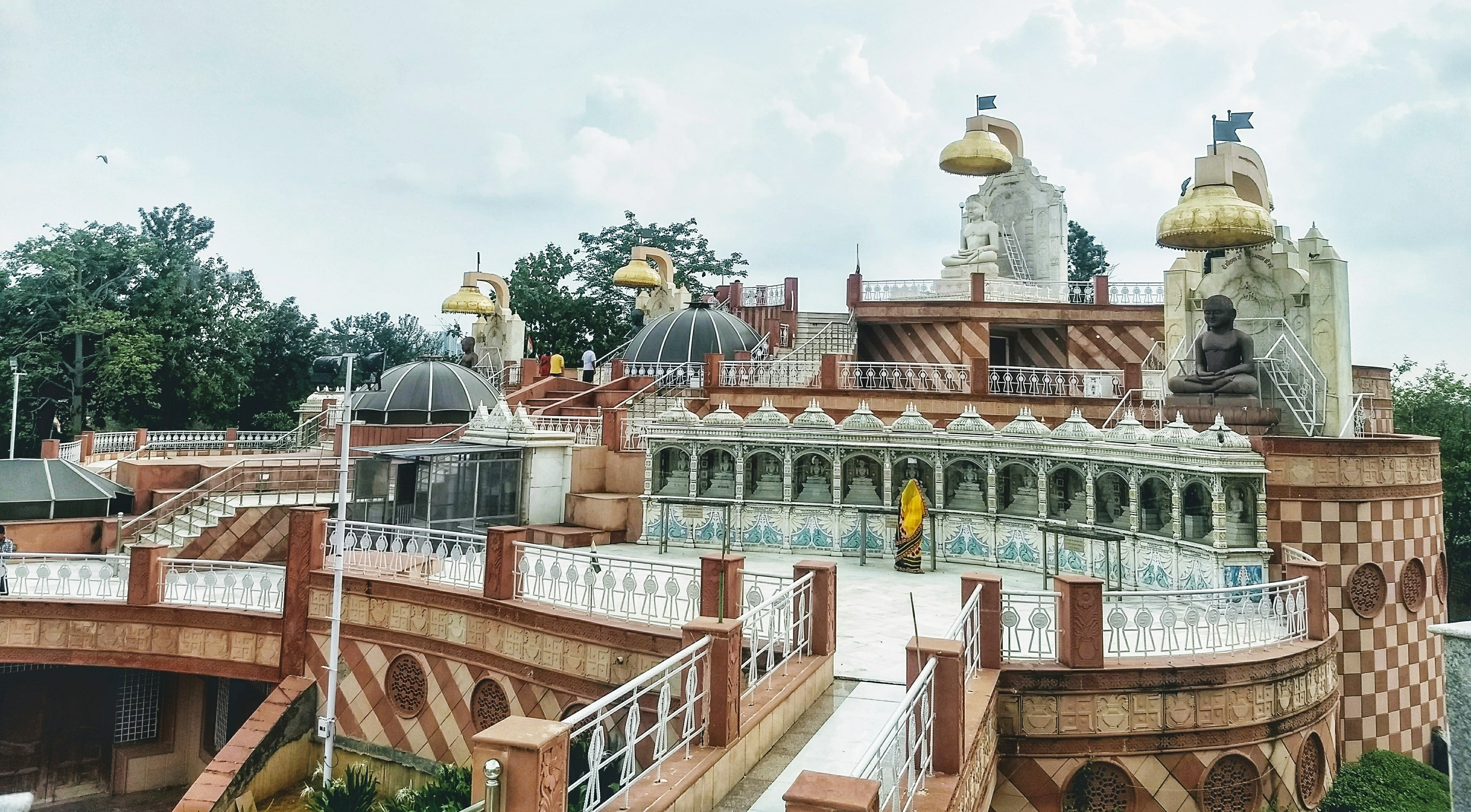
Siddhant Tirth Kshetra Shikohpur

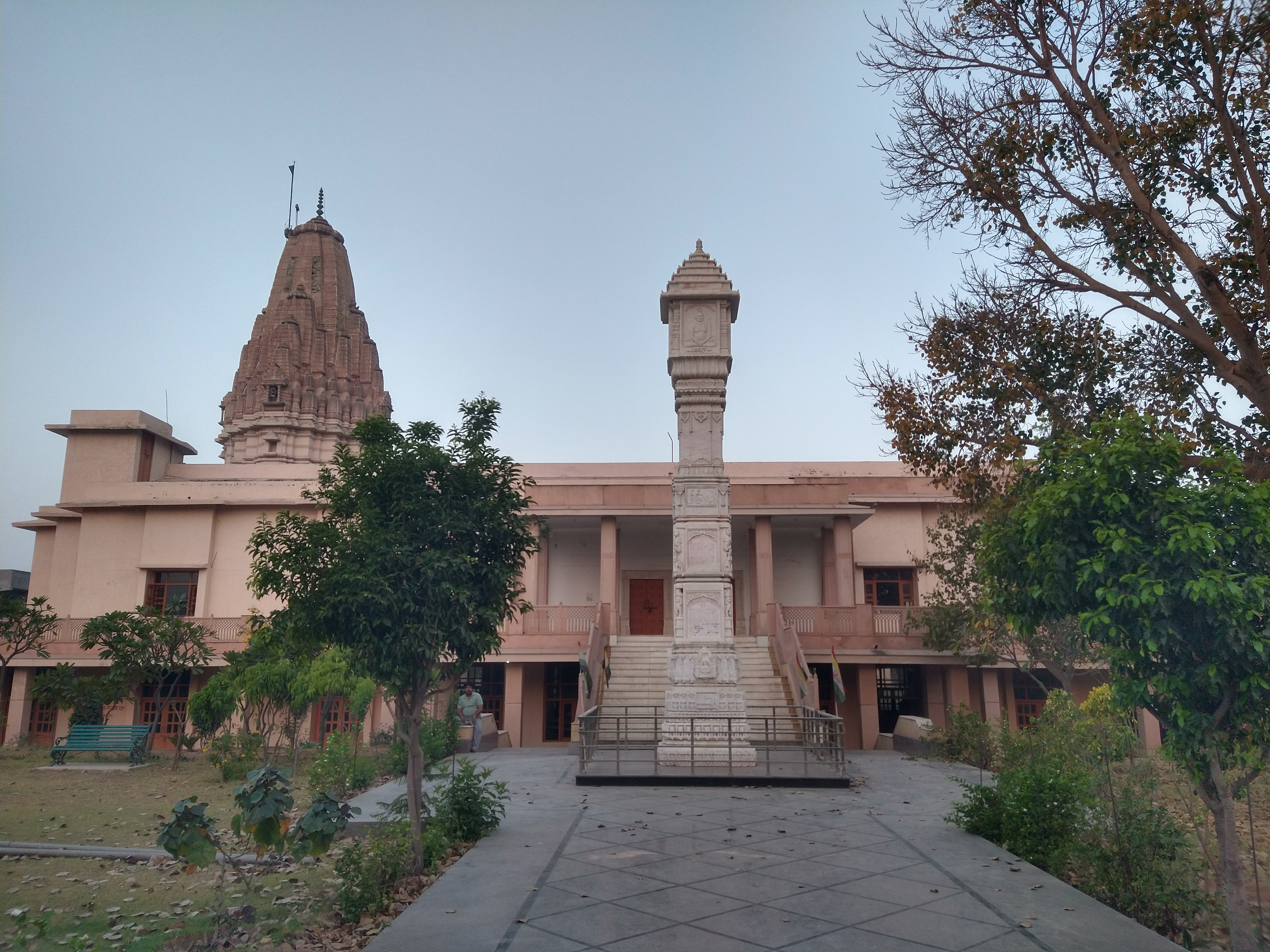
Ranila Jain temple

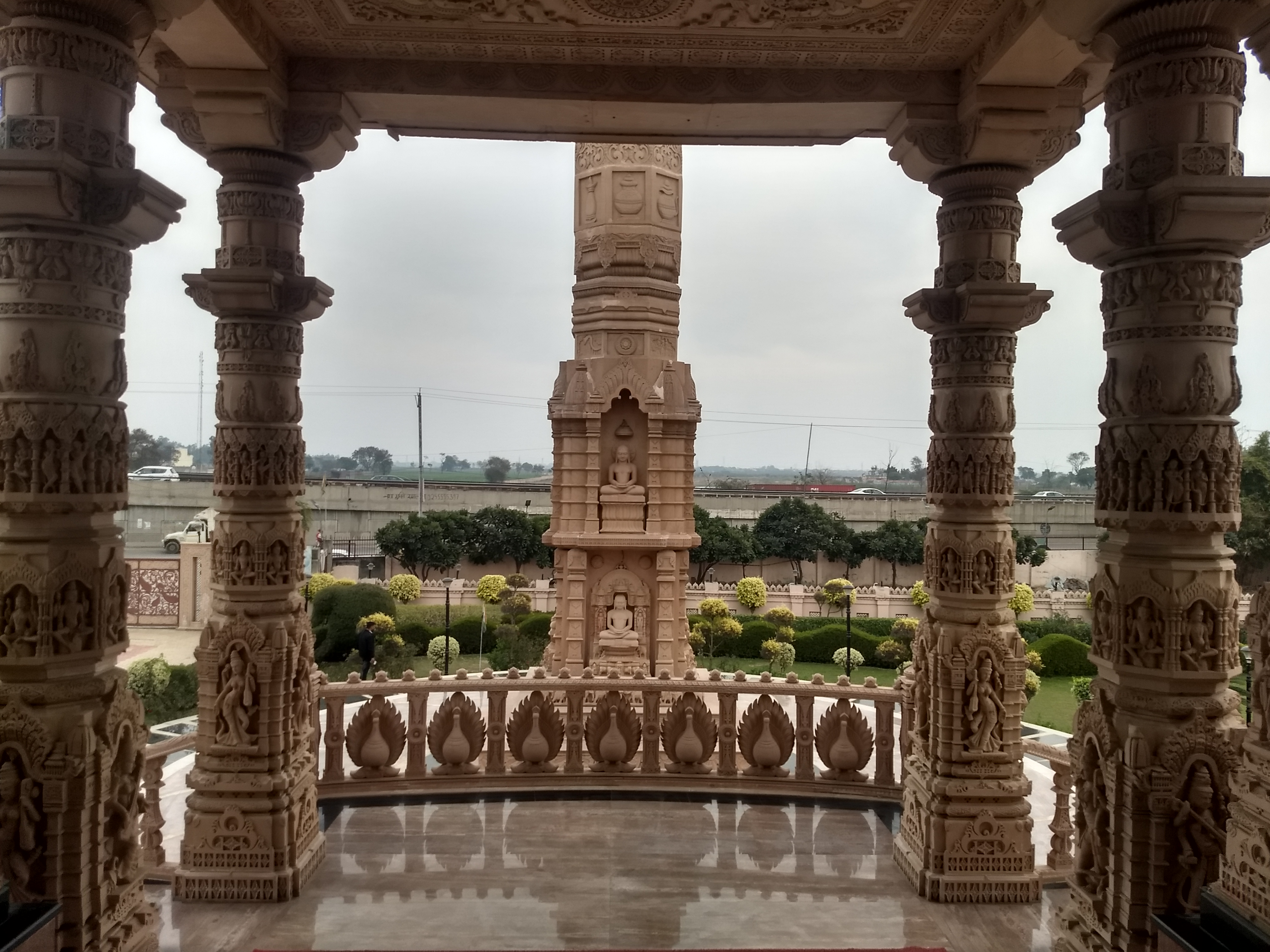
Gupti dham

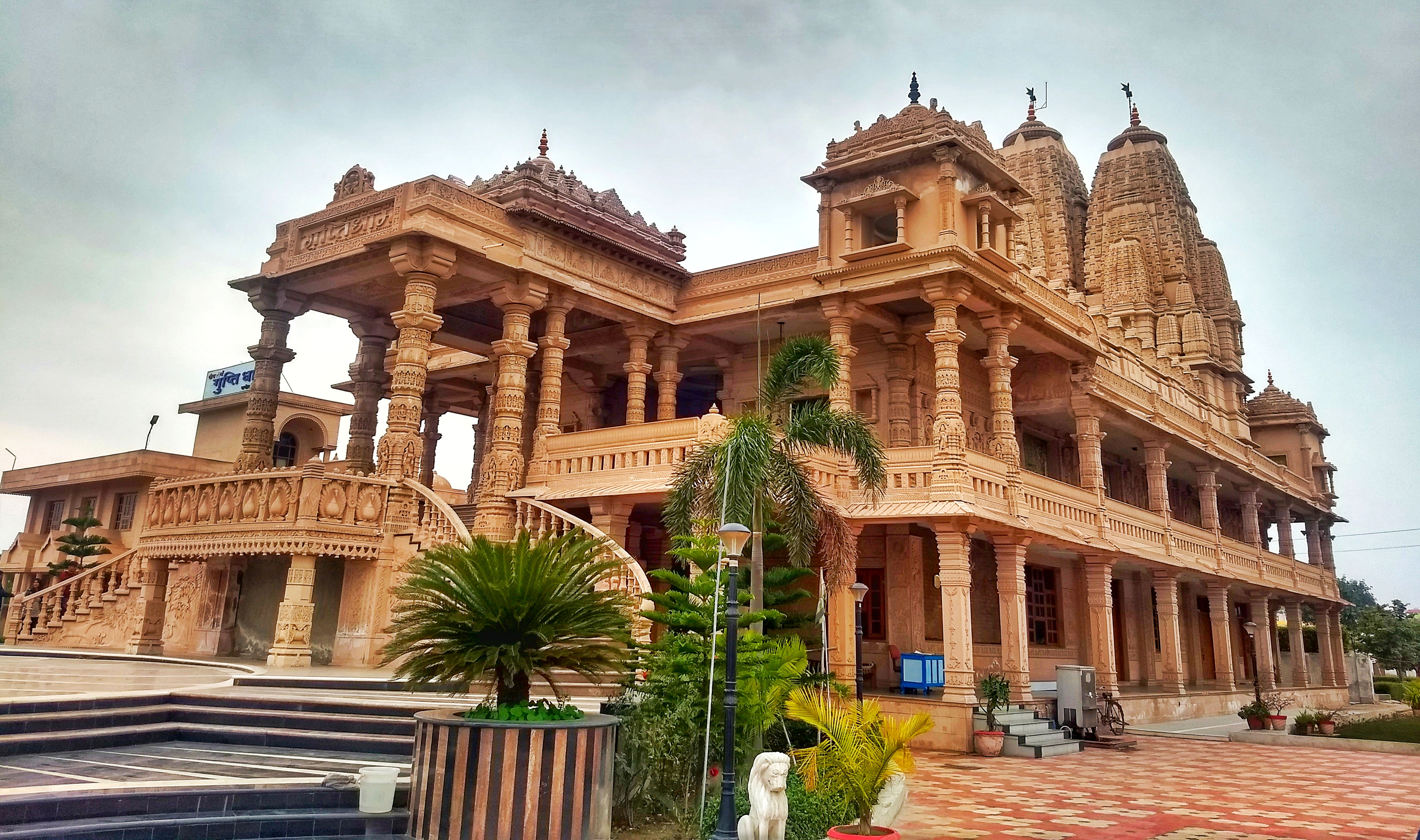
Gupti dham

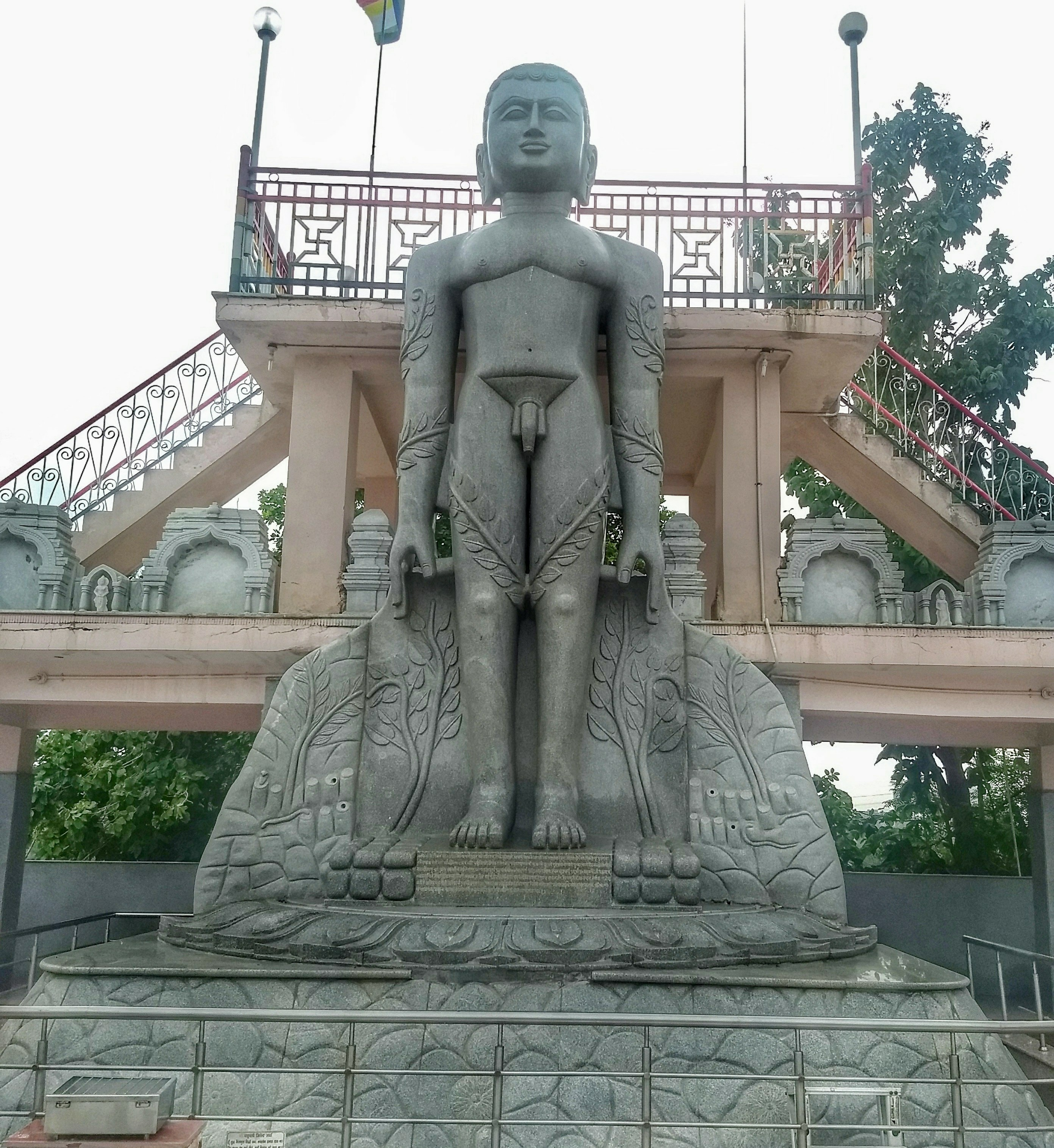
18 ft statue of lord Bahubali at Siddhant Tirth Kshetra Shikohpur

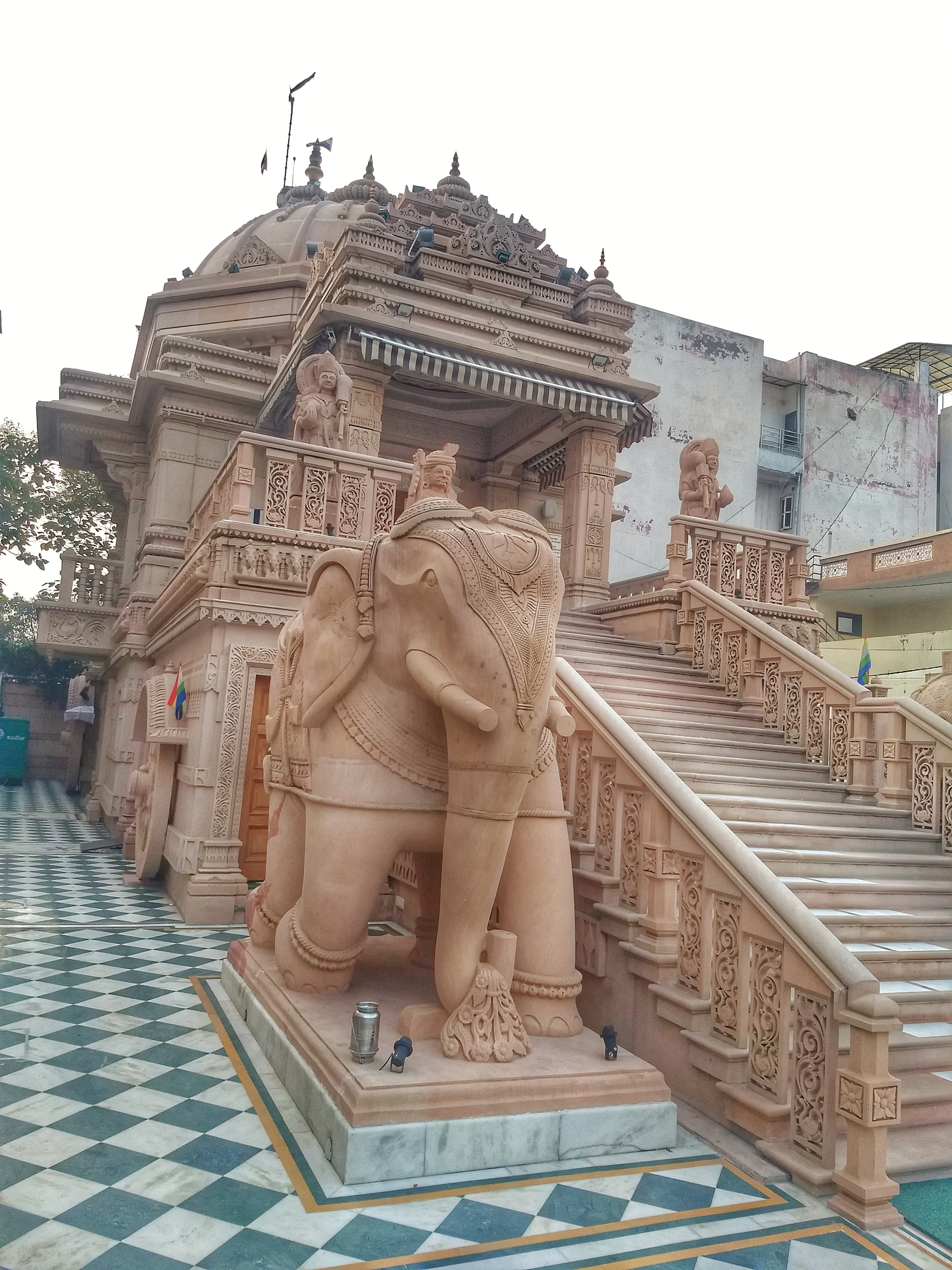
Gaj Mandir, Rohtak
- Rohtak
  - Rohitaka
  - Shri Digambar Jain Temple
- Hansi
  - Punyodaya Tirth
  - Shri 1008 Bhagwan Parshwanath Digambar Jain Mandir
- Gurgaon
  - Shri 1008 Mahavira Swami Digambar Jain Atishay Kshetra Kasangaon
- Nuh
  - Dehra Temple, Bhond village
- Bhiwani
  - Ranila Jain temple, Adinathpuram
- Ambala
  - Suparshvanatha temple - 105 years old belonging to Śvetāmbara
  - Ancient Adinath Digambara temple
- Pratiksha

== Events ==
Government of Haryana (BJP) banned meat for nine days in September 2015 during the Jain festival of Paryushana. This was done by issuing a circular to all the municipal bodies asking meat shop vendors not to sell meat or fish on 17, 18 and 27 September 2015. Muni Tarunsagar conducted his 2015 chaturmas in Sector 16, Faridabad and made a world record during launch of his book, Kadve-Pravachans.

== Notable people ==
- Kavita Jain
- Mool Chand Jain M.L.A and Finance Minister
