= Punyodaya Tirth =

Historic Jain site in Haryana, India

Coordinates: 29.0965°N 75.9371°E

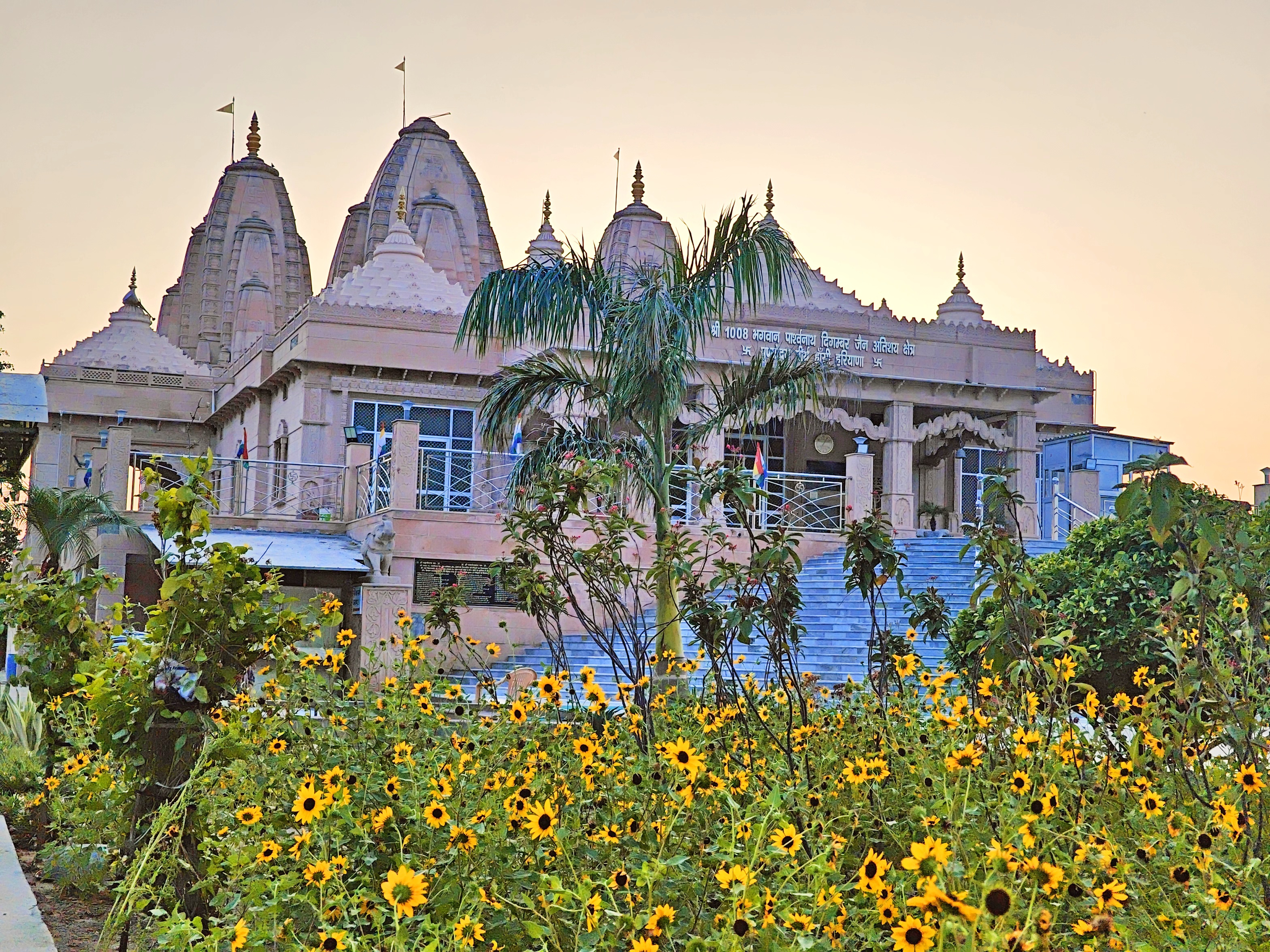
- Punyodaya Tirth

Religion
- Affiliation: Jainism
- Deity: Parshvanatha

Location
- Location: Hansi, Hisar
- Interactive map of Punyodaya Tirth

Architecture
- Established: 20th century
- Temple: 2

Punyodaya Tirth Khestra is an important Jain temple and associated Jain archaeological material discovered at Hansi in Hisar district, Haryana, India. The site is also associated with Hansi hoard.

== History ==
Hansi was an important centre of Jain activity in early medieval Haryana. Jain sculptures and architectural remains have been discovered at the ancient mound associated with the fort at Hansi. The temple enshrines four stone sculptures of Parshvanatha, along with architectural panels dated 9th-10th centuries during excavation.

The remains included architectural fragments of large Jain temple along with Jain sculptures provides evidence for Jain establishment during medieval period. The ancient mound at Hansi preserves a long archaeological sequence extending beyond its Jain remains with artefacts from 3rd century BCE to 11th century CE.

The stone sculptures, architectural remains and the bronze hoard indicates the presence of Jainism in Haryana during the early medieval period.

== Hansi hoard ==
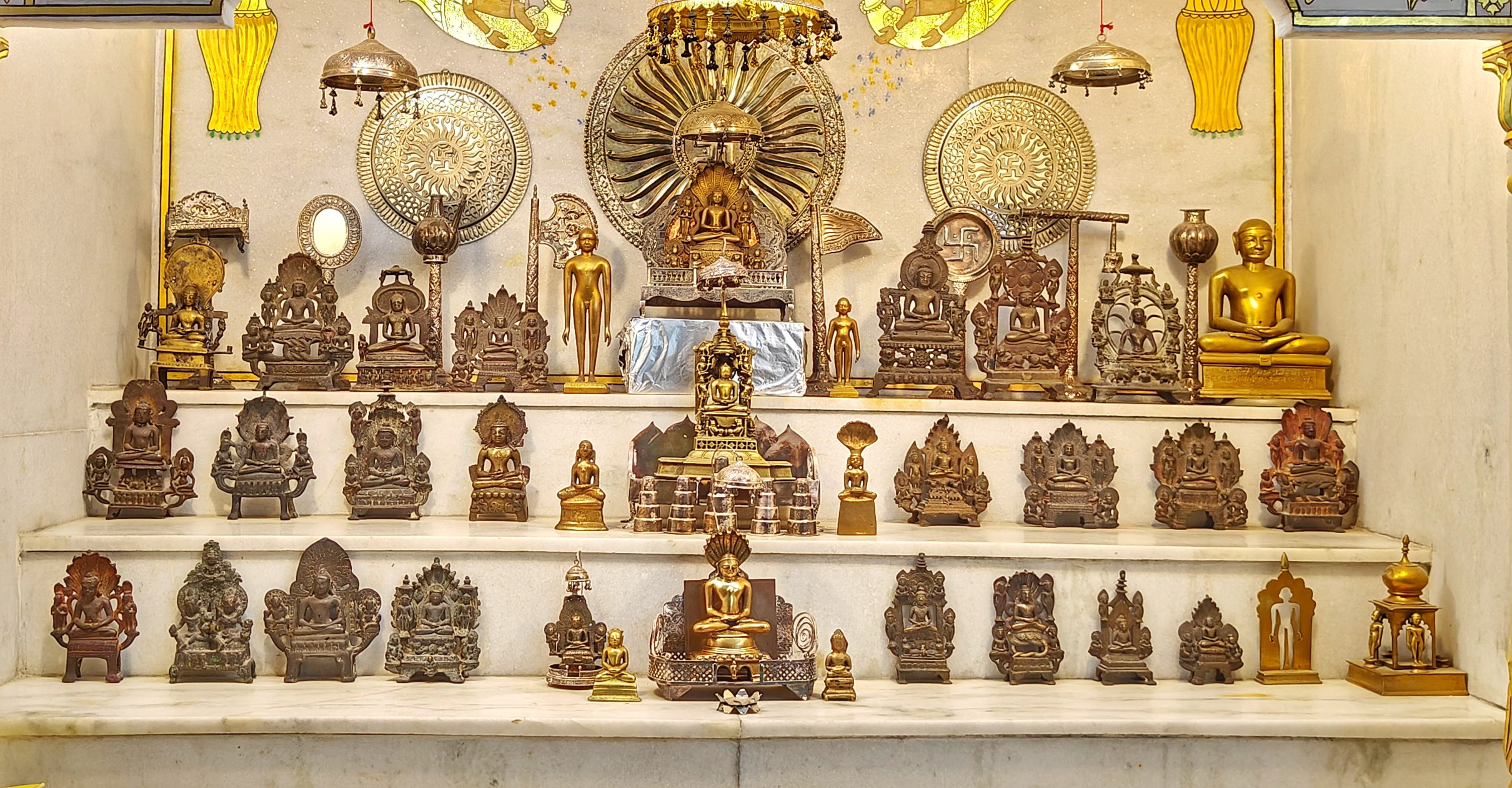
Hansi hoard, 8th—9th century

In February 1982, a significant hoard of Jain bronze images was accidentally discovered at Hansi. The images had been deposited together in a large copper vessel at the ancient mound.

Hansi hoard is a collection of 57 Jain bronze idol include collection from both the Digambara and Śvētāmbara traditions were discovered from Asigarh Fort. The hoard is significant for the study of the early history of Jainism and bronze sculpture in Haryana and provides an important archaeological evidence for the early presence of Jainism in the region.

== Sculpture and iconography ==
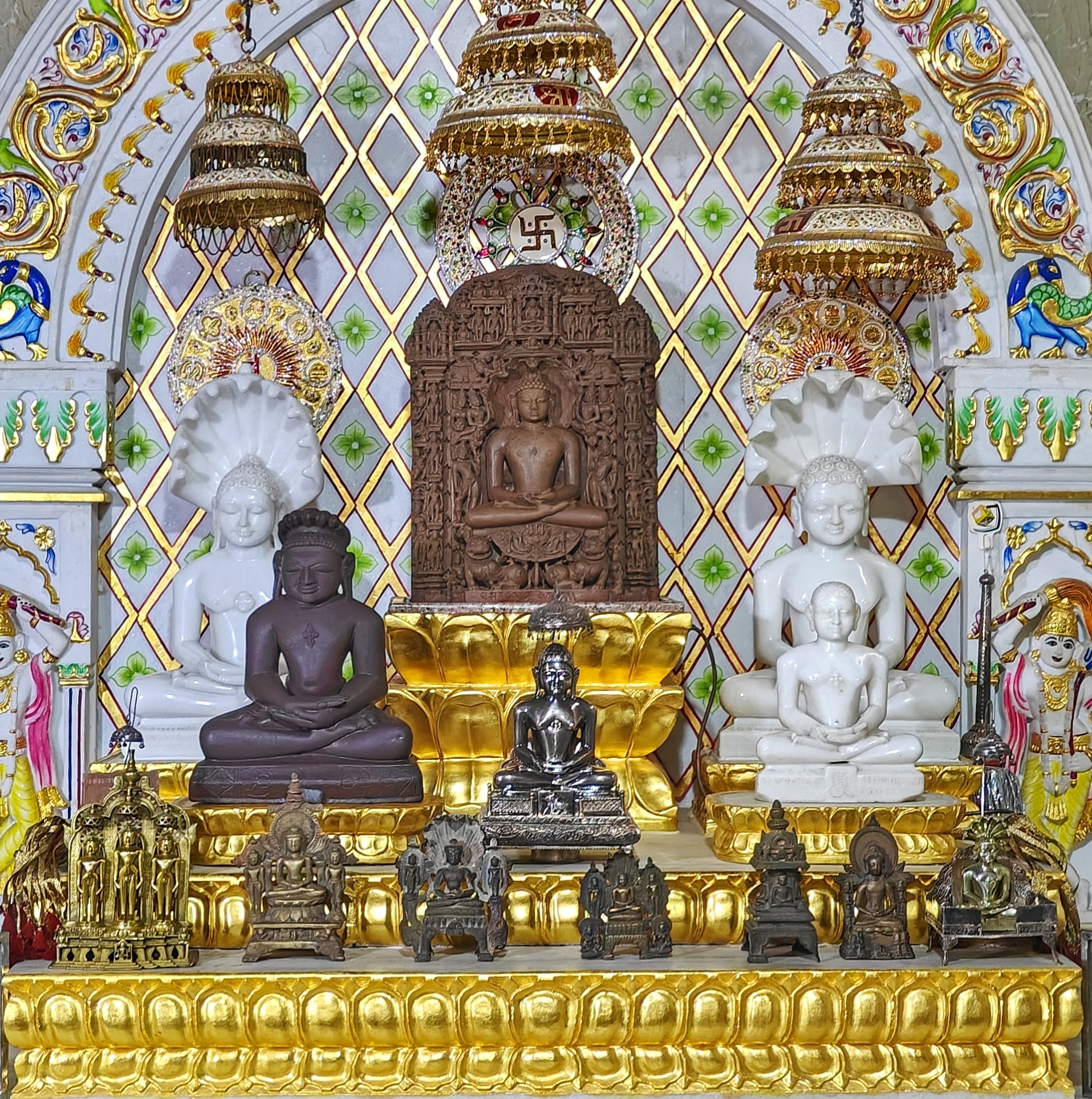
Main vedi

The archaeological material from Hansi includes both stone and bronze Jain sculpture. Four stone sculptures of Parshvanatha were recovered during archaeological investigations at the site. The bronze hoard contains representations of several Jain figures and provides evidence for the development of Jain bronze iconography in northern India.

The collection includes images associated with both the Digambara and Śvētāmbara traditions signifies coexistence of both sects in the region. Later scholarship has also used sculptures from the Hansi hoard in studies of the development of Jain iconography. In particular, examples from Hansi have been discussed in relation to the development of multi-Jina compositions in early medieval Jain bronze sculpture.

53 out of 57 idols were stolen in 2005 but were later recovered.

== See also ==
- Dehra Temple
- Ranila Jain temple
- Asigarh Fort
