= Dhamana, Hisar =

Dhamana
- village
- Dhamana
- Nickname: Dhamian
- Location in Haryana, India Dhamana (India)
- Coordinates: 29.006353°N 75.819984°E
- Country: India
- State: Haryana
- District: Hisar district
- Municipality: Hansi

Government
  - Sarpanch: Rajesh Yadav
- PIN: 125037
- ISO 3166 code: IN-HR
- Website: haryana.gov.in

Dhamana is a village in Hansi-I mandal of the Hisar district, in the Indian state of Haryana. It is in between the towns of Hisar and Tosham at about 20 kilometres (12 mi) on the Main District Road 108 (MDR 108). Dhamana is fifth village on Hisar-Tosam road, first is Dabra, Second is Mirkan, Third is Bhojraj, Four is Gunjar. Then Fifth is Dhamana. This village is also known as village of Ahir's peoples.

== Adjacent villages ==
- Dabra (first village at Hisar-Tosham road) on MDR 108
- Mirkan (second village at Hisar-Tosham road) on MDR 108
- Bhojraj (third village at Hisar-Tosham road) on MDR 108
- Gunjar (fourth village)
- Dhamana (fifth village from Hisar to Tosham road)
- Kanwari (sixth village from Hisar to Tosham road)
- Balawas (seventh village at Hisar-Tosham road) on MDR 108 village having similar name is in Rewari District
- Nalwa (eighth village at Hisar-Tosham road) on MDR 108
- Khanak (ninth village at Hisar-Tosham road) on MDR 108
- Kutiya (mangali) in between Mirkan and Bhojraj.

== Demographics ==
As of 2011 India census, Dhamana had a population of 1804 in 352 households. Males (931) constitute 51.6% of the population and females (873) 48.39%. Dhamana has an average literacy (1226) rate of 67.96%, less than the national average of 74%: male literacy (729) is 59.46%, and female literacy (497) is 40.53%. In Dhamana, 10.75% of the population is under 6 years of age (194). It is also named as Dhamian in maps and in census 2011.

↓
931	873
Male	Female
