= Adeeng, Uttar Pradesh =

Adeeng Ading
- Town
- Location in Uttar Pradesh, India
- Coordinates: 27.5°N 77.47°E
- Country: India
- State: Uttar Pradesh
- District: Mathura
- Elevation: 179 m (587 ft)

Population (2011)
  - Total: 14,608

Languages
  - Official: Hindi
  - Native: Braj Bhasha dialect
- Time zone: UTC+5:30 (IST)
- PIN: 281501
- Vehicle registration: UP-85

Adeeng, Ading is a town and a Gram panchayat in the Mathura district of the Indian state of Uttar Pradesh.

== History ==
Ading in present is a historical village (presently a town) near Govardhan. During the Hindu rule, Mathura was divided into five parts - Ading, Sonsa, Saunkh, Farah and Govardhan. According to Hindu beliefs, Lord Krishna killed Aristasur at this place. Therefore, this area was known as Arishtagam (Arista). At present, it is known as Ading. Arishta was named Ading due to the bigotry of these rulers. Faudasingh, Jaitsingh, Balakchand were born but Ading gained fame in history in the time of Anup Singh, Faud Singh, Jait Singh. In the time of Badan Singh, Raja Anoop Singh has been described as one of the powerful kings of Braj.
