= Chanot =

- Village
- Location within Haryana Location within India
- Coordinates: 29.213056°N 75.9175°E
- Country: India
- State: Haryana
- District: Hisar
- Subdistrict: Hansi
- Time zone: UTC+05:30 (IST)
- PIN code: 125033

Chanot is a village in Hansi -1 tehsil of Hisar district, in the Indian state of Haryana. The majority is of Duhan Clan of Jaat caste which are originated from king surada in the same ancestry of Sinsinwar

The village is named after Dadi Chaini Devi Chahal, an elder who was its first inhabitant, initially Daughter of Mahjot village. She was married in Sagban village in Duhan family. For an unknown reason, she came to the place where the present Chanot lies. Chanot is in the Hansi constituency of the Haryana legislature and the Hisar constituency in the Lok Sabha (Parliamentary) system.

== Services ==
The village hosts a Dispensary, Tuition Center, Common Service Center, Ration Distribution Center, SBI Kiosk Center, Veterinary Hospital, Community Center, Marriage Place, various Chapels, Patwari office, BSNL exchange, streetlights, paved streets, electricity complaint center, and markets.

== Transport ==
The village is connected to neighboring villages by roads, bus routes, and a public health tanker with boosting pumps. A petrol pump is available. A playground with a statue of Netaji Subhash Chandra Bose.

Shree DaiyaRam (दैयाराम) was the first Nambardar of the village.

== Geography ==
Chanot is located in State Highway No. 17 (Hansi - Barwala road).

Chanot is surrounded by Tehsil Hansi to the south, Barwala Tehsil to the north, Narnaund Tehsil to the east, and Hisar-II Tehsil to the west.

=== Nearby villages ===
- Bhatla – 4 kilometers (2.49 miles)
- Kharkari – 5 kilometers (3.11 miles)
- Khokha – 4 kilometers (2.49 miles)
- Kulana – 6 kilometers (3.73 miles)
- Singhwa Ragho – 6 kilometers (3.73 miles)
- Masoodpur – 6 kilometers (3.73 miles)
- Sindhar – 7 kilometers (4.35 miles)
- South – Hansi (12 kilometers), west – Hisar (22 kilometers), north – Barwala (18 kilometers), east – Jind (42 kilometers) are the nearby cities.

=== Ponds (Talab) (Lohad) ===
- Panjrukha (named after five trees) (Sanskrit word panch+rukha).
- Dada Chauvala (named after Dada chuhe wala). It is universally called BADA JOHAD (The Big Pond).
- Johari (Dada Silga's Pond)
- Kumhar Khadde
- Dobhi.

== List of Sarpanch (Head of Panchayat) ==
The incumbent Sarpanch of the village is Smt Saraswati Devi w/o Himanshu (Reserved) (2022-till now) who has held the position since 2022.

Former Sarpanch:

- Sh. Shambhudatt Sharma (first Sarpanch of Chanot)
- Shri Rammehar Shobharam Duhan (2016-2022)
- Smt. Sajjana Satyawan Duhan (2010-2016)
- Indra Devi W/O Rajpal Singh (2005-2010) (RESERVED)
- Master Jagdish Singh Duhan (2000-2005)
- Jaibir Singh Duhan (1995-2000)
- Advocate Ved Prakash
- Chandagi Ram Duhan
- Randhir singh duhan
- Daleep Singh Duhan
- Sudha Ram Duhan

== Education ==
- Aryavart Sr. Sec. School: established in 2003
- Government High School, Chanot.
- Lalji Ram Memorial High School (LRM), Chanot, established in 1997.
- Adarsh High School, Chanot, was established in 2009.
- Kiran Public School, Chanot.

== Places of worship ==
=== Temples ===
- Dada Khera
- Baba Satgar Ji Maharaj (The True Teacher)
- Baba Lal Das Ji Maharaj (Saladerry Dham Wale)
- Baba Atvaar Puri Ji Maharaj
- Baba Bajrang Bali And Lord Shiva

== External list ==
- "Chanot Pin Code, Chanot, Hisar Map, Latitude and Longitude, Haryana". indiamapia.com.
- "Pincode 125033 - Chanot B.O, Haryana". IndiaStudyChannel.com.
- "Haryana Villages". gospelgo.com.
