= Dhani Brahmnan =

Dhani Brahmnan is a village situated 9 kilometers from Hansi in Hisar district, Haryana, on Jind Road.

== School ==
G Sec. (G) S Brahmano Ki Dhani Secondary School is located in the Dhani Brahmanan village, Surajgarh Block, Jhunjhunun District, Rajasthan State, India. Established in 1958, the school is one of the top-rated schools for girls in Rajasthan, with an excellent academic track record.
