= Isharheri =

Village in Haryana, India

Isharheri is a village in Hansi-I mandal of the Hisar district, in the Indian state of Haryana.
