= Borapa =

Town in Uttar Pradesh

Coordinates: 27.452169230394425°N 77.52190751047306°E

Borapa also known as Borpa (Village ID 124249) is a small village located 20 km from Mathura in west and about 4 km from the town Sonkh in the state of Uttar Pradesh, India. According to the 2011 census it has a population of 2057 living in 330 households. The village is a part of India's vast network of rural settlements, where agriculture serves as the primary source of livelihood for most residents. The Ganges River flows relatively close to the area, providing water resources that support irrigation and crop cultivation in the village. The climate in Borapa is typical of North Indian plains, with hot summers, a monsoon season from June to September, and cool winters.

== Demographics ==
Borapa has a small population, primarily consisting of agricultural communities. The village's demographics reflect the region's cultural diversity, with people practicing Hinduism as the predominant religion. Families are often extended, living in joint family systems, which is common in rural parts of Uttar Pradesh. Education levels vary, with limited access to advanced educational facilities within the village, though efforts are being made to improve literacy rates and educational access.

v= Economy and Livelihood == The economy of Borapa is primarily agrarian, with most residents engaged in farming and related activities. Common crops grown include wheat, rice, pulses, and sugarcane, benefiting from the fertile soil and ample water resources. Animal husbandry is also a supplementary occupation for many households, providing additional income and resources such as milk and meat. The agricultural produce from Borapa often contributes to local markets in nearby towns and cities.

== Development ==
Borapa, like many rural villages in Uttar Pradesh, faces challenges in infrastructure development. Access to clean drinking water, sanitation facilities, and electricity has improved in recent years due to government schemes focused on rural development. Road connectivity has also seen gradual improvements, connecting Borapa to nearby towns and facilitating the transportation of goods and services. However, access to healthcare remains limited, with primary health services available only in nearby towns.

== Culture and festivals ==
The culture of Borapa is deeply rooted in traditions, with festivals playing a significant role in the social fabric. Major Hindu festivals such as Diwali, Holi, and Dussehra are celebrated with enthusiasm. Additionally, local fairs and religious gatherings are part of the village's cultural calendar. Traditional music, dance, and folk art are essential aspects of Borapa's cultural identity, often displayed during festivals and communal gatherings.
