= Rebellion of Jatwan =

1192 Indian rebellion against the Ghurid Sultanate

- Part of Indian campaigns of Muhammad of Ghor
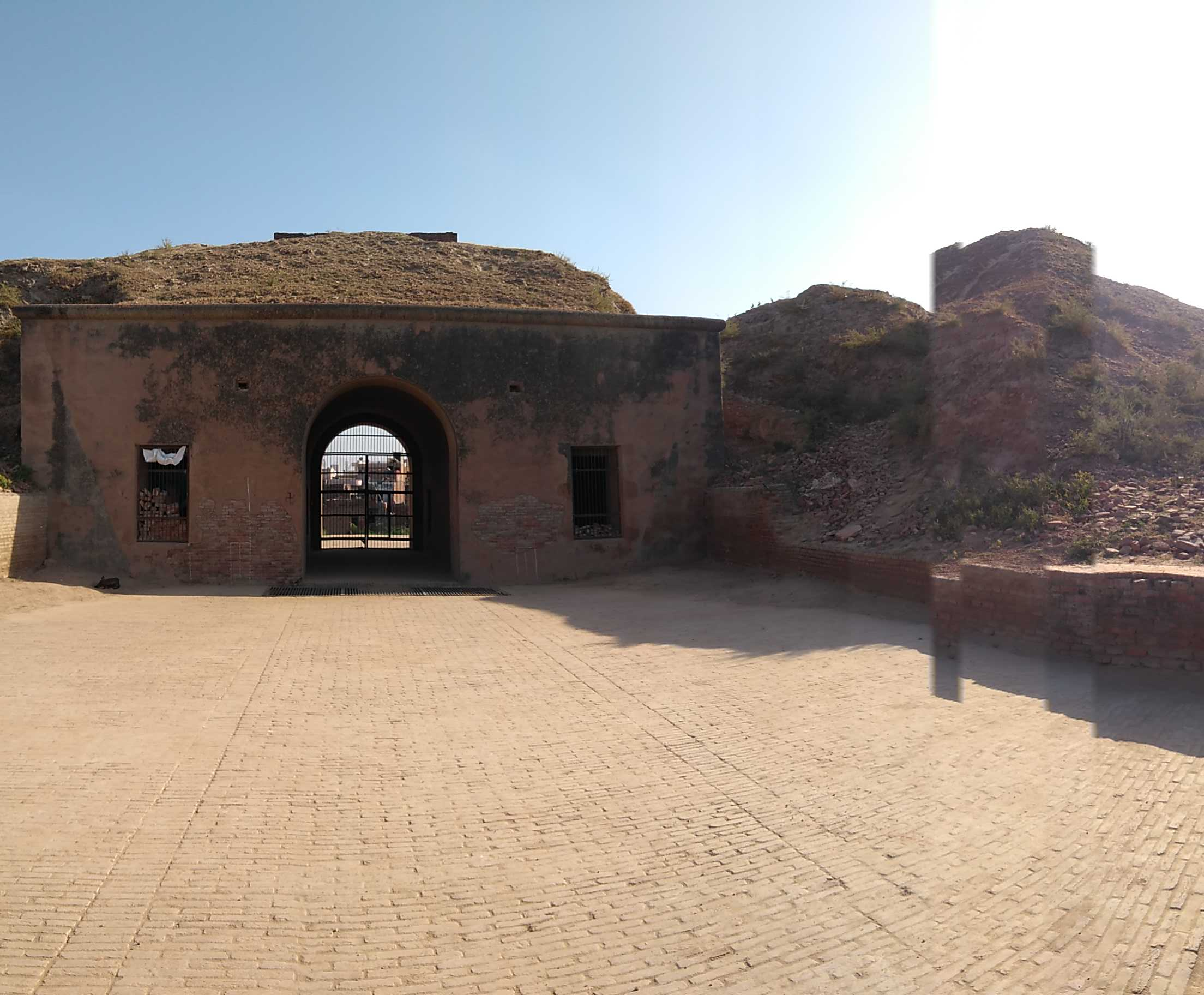
- Hansi fort which was besieged by Jatwan
Date	September 1192
Location	Bagar, Jhunjhunu 28.18°N 75.50°E
Result	Ghurid victory

Belligerents
Ghurid dynasty	Jatwan

Commanders and leaders
Qutb ud-Din Aibak	Jatwan †
- Location of Bagar Rebellion of Jatwan (India)

The Rebellion of Jatwan was a revolt staged by Jatwan against the Ghurid empire in 1192 CE. The Ghurids defeated the rebel forces and Jatwan was killed in the battle.

In 1192, soon after the second battle of Tarain, Jatwan, a subordinate of Prithviraj Chauhan, besieged Hansi, which came under Ghurid rule after the battle. After the defeat of Prithviraj Chauhan in 1192 AD, Jatwan raised the standard of revolt and besieged the Muslim commander Nasrat Uddin at Hansi. On receiving this news Qutb-ud-din Aibak marched twelve farsakhs, i.e., about 40 miles (64 km) in one night. Jatwan raised the siege of Hansi and prepared for an obstinate conflict. "The armies attacked each other", says the author of Taj-ul-Maasir, "like two hills of steel, and the field of battle [on the borders of the Bager country] became tulip-dyed with the blood of warriors ... Jatwan had his standards of God-plurality and ensigns of perdition lowered by the hand of power".
