= Hansi Block of Hisar District =

Hansi
- city
- Location within Haryana Location within India
- Coordinates: 29.1°N 75.97°E
- Country: India
- State: Haryana
- District: Hisar
- Elevation: 207 m (679 ft)

Population (2001)
  - Total: 75,730

Languages
  - Official: Hindi, Regional Haryanvi
- Time zone: UTC+5:30 (IST)
- PIN: 125033
- Telephone code: 01663
- ISO 3166 code: IN-HR
- Vehicle registration: HR 21
- Website: haryana.gov.in

Hansi block is a cluster of villages and Hansi is a small town/ city and a municipal council in Hisar district in the Indian state of Haryana. Its 2011 population is estimated to be 134,568. It is located at a distance of 16 miles (26 km) east of Hisar on National Highway 09.Village Sorkhi is located on NH 09, almost between Hansi and Meham. The name of this village has been taken from Sorukhi -100 trees (rukh in Haryana). When this village came into existence, there was a pond surrounded by 100 trees. ThandiRam Berwal alias Thandiya (Udaipur, Rajasthan) and Rajmal Sheoran (Mandoli Kalan, District Bhiwani) came to this place in 1755 (Vikram Samvat 1812) and named village the name of Sorukhi. In the documents of the British Government, it has been registered under the name of Surkhi.Jat is main caste of this village. Apart from Jat Brahmin, Bania, Khati, Naai, Jogi, Kumhar, Lohar, Jhimar, Dhanak, Chamar, Balmiki, Sansi etc. live in this village. The main language here is Harianvi Boli and people used to Hindi and Urdu also. Hisar District has Seven blocks (Narnaund, Adampur, Uklana, Nalwa, Barwala, Hisar and Hansi) and Hansi is one of them and villages of Hansi Mandal are as under-

- Dhana Kalan
- Dhani Kutubpur
- Depal
- Kulana
- Umara
- Sorkhi
- Shekhpura
- Sultanpur
- Dhani Raju
- Jamawari
- Ramayan
- Ghirai
- Mehenda
- Bhatla
- Kheri Gagan Garhi
- Chanot Hazampur
- Puthi Mangal Khan
- Dhana Khurd
- Dhani Pal
- Kumbha
- Dhani Perawali
- Rampura
- Muzadpura
- Kanwari
- Dhamana
