= Ranila Jain temple =

Ranila
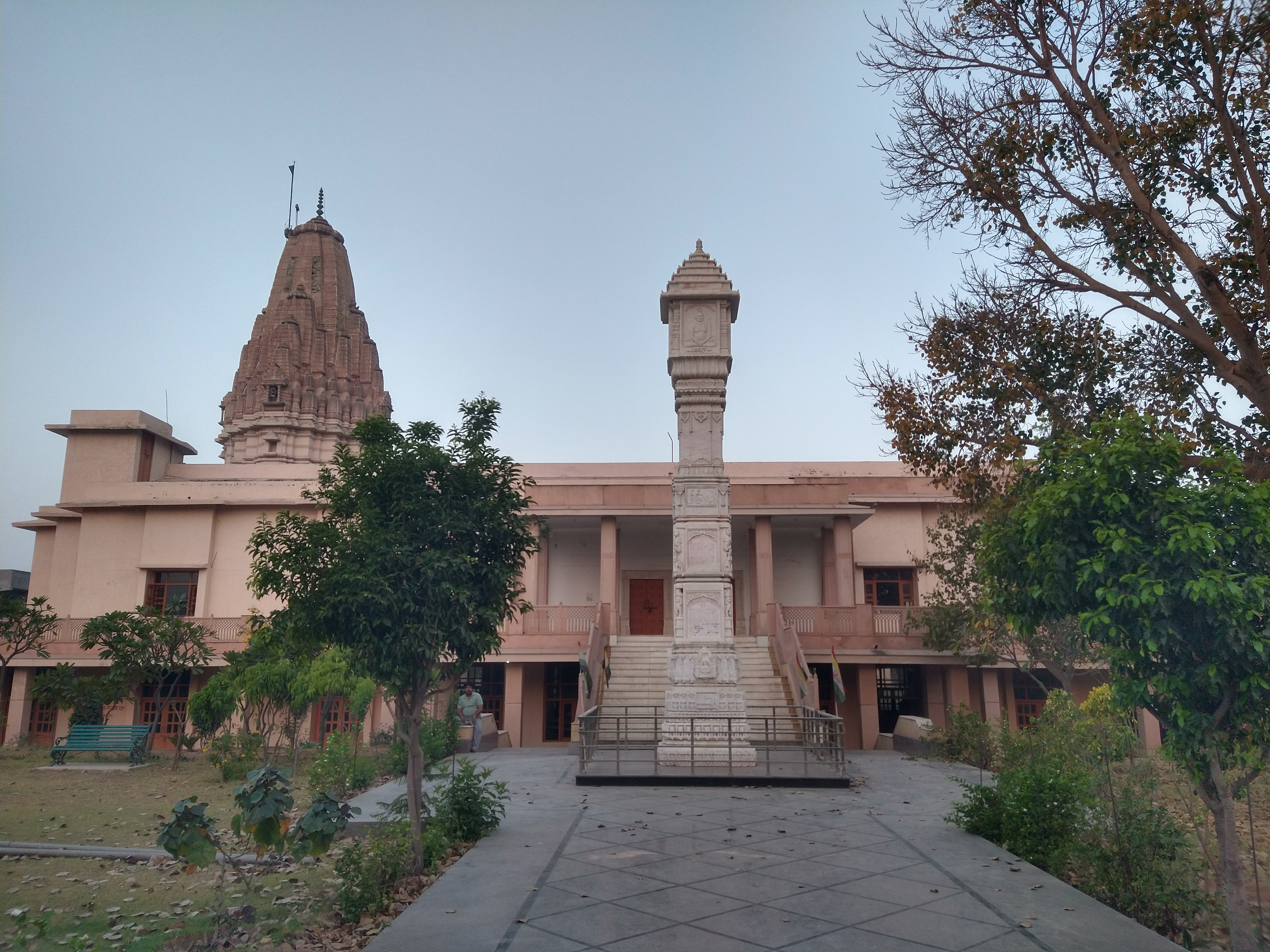
- Adinathpuram Jain temple

Religion
- Affiliation: Jainism
- Deity: Rishabhanatha
- Festival: Mahavir Jayanti

Location
- Location: Charkhi Dadri, Haryana
- Interactive map of Ranila
- Coordinates: 28°42′33.5″N 76°20′29.6″E

Architecture
- Established: 1991
- Temple: 3

Ranila Jain temple is a Jain temple in Ranila village in the Charkhi Dadri district of Haryana.

== History ==
Ranila was an important Jain center during the medieval period with royal patronage of Tomara dynasty and Chahamanas dynasty.

== About temple ==
Bhagwan Adinath Digambar Jain Temple is located at Adinath Puram, Ranilla. The magnificent temple is considered very miraculous. Ranila has two important red sand stone Jain idols. These idols are dedicated to Adinatha and Goddess Chakreshwari Devi were excavated by Ranjit Singh while working on his field. These images dates back to 6th-7th century. The idol of Adinatha is richly carved with image of Adinatha in center and images of 24 tirthankar in both padmasan and kayotsarga posture. Adinath is depicted with Shrivatsa on chest and carving of bull below the pedestal. The idol has carvings of yaksha, flask bearer, flying couple with garland, asoka tree, tricchatra, elephant and aparaharyas. The idol of adinath is placed inside the temple as mulnayak of the temple and chakreshvari devi is housed inside a smaller shrine. Chakreshvari is depicted in Lalitasana seated on garuda, with multiple hands holding various attributes. There is an image of tirthankar on the head and two attendants on either side of the Chakreshvari image. The temple also has a dharamshala equipped with all modern facilities along with a bhojanalya.

== Gallery ==
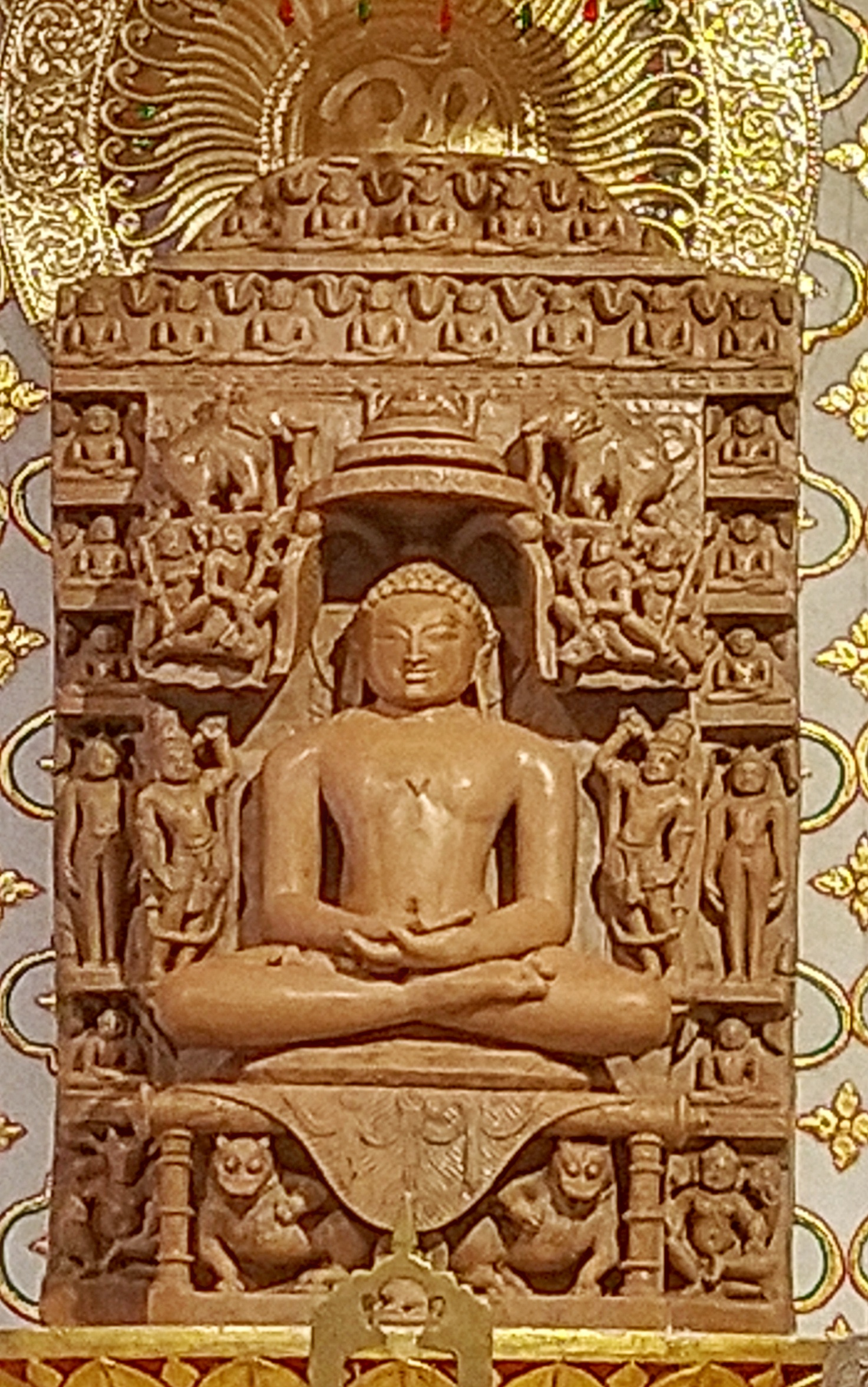
Rishabhanath idol inside Jain temple

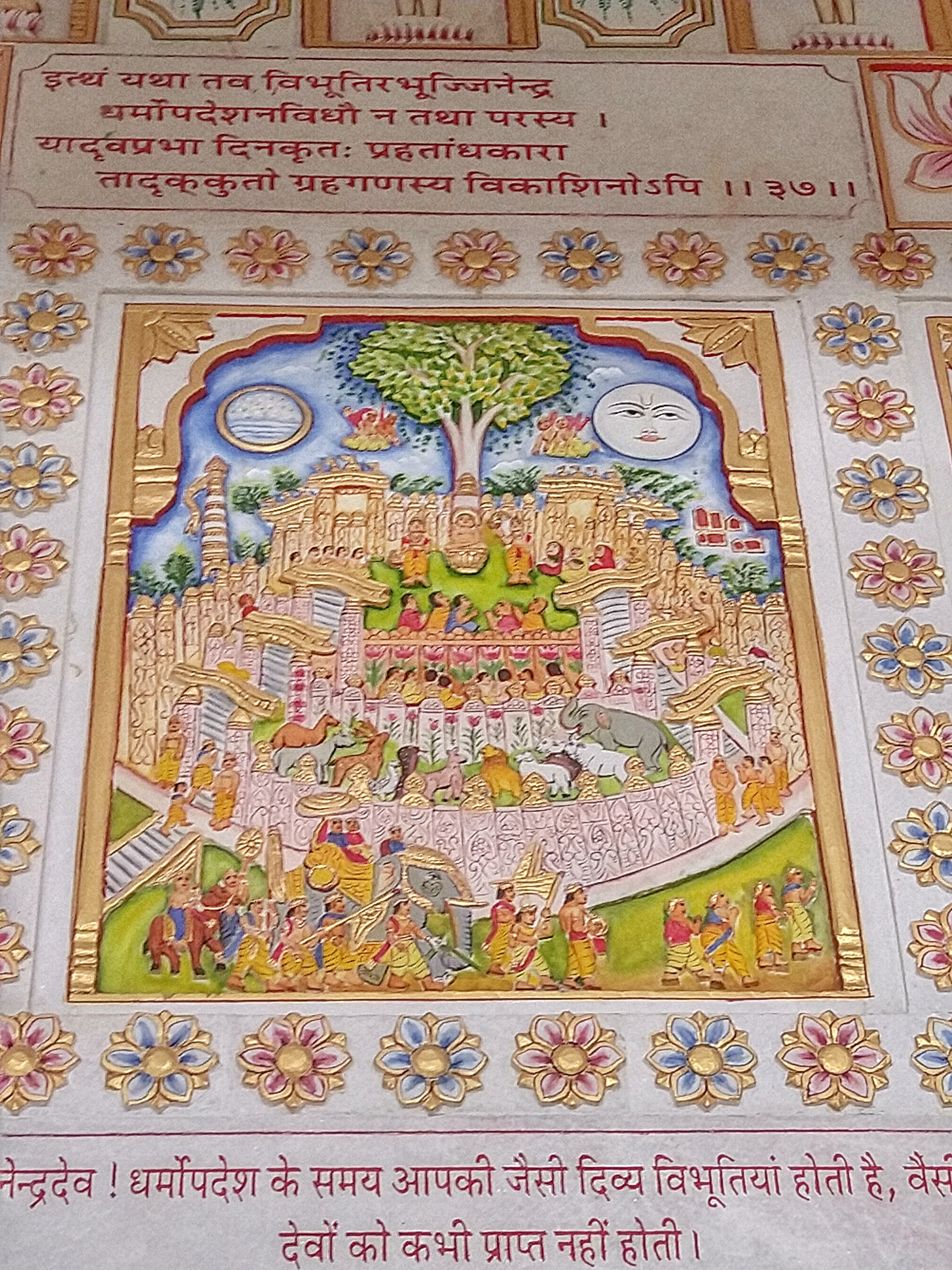
Mural of Samavasarana

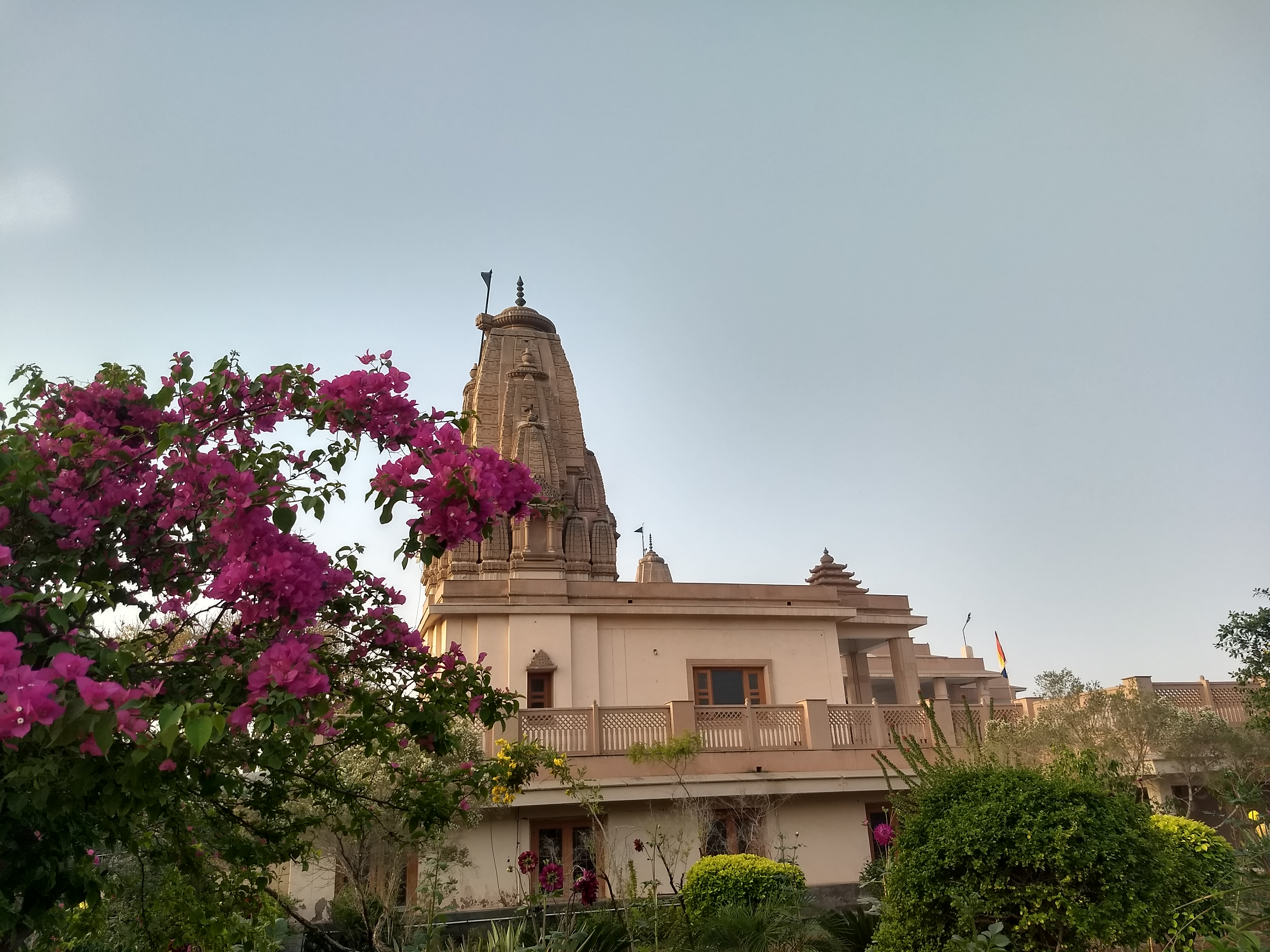
Charan temple

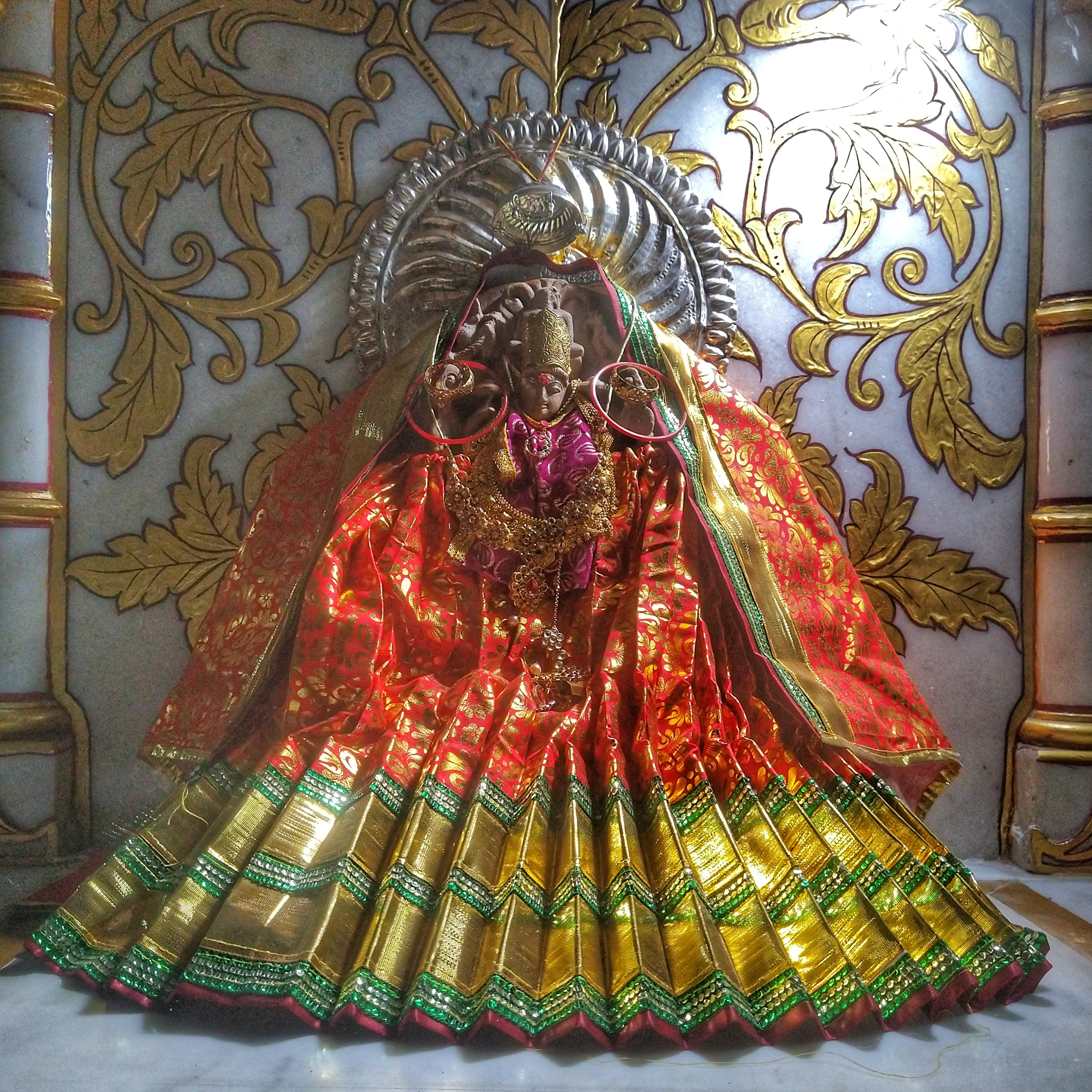
Idol of Goddess Chakreshvari

== See also ==
- Hansi
- Rohtak
- Jainism in Haryana
