= Asigarh Fort =

Fort in Hayana, India

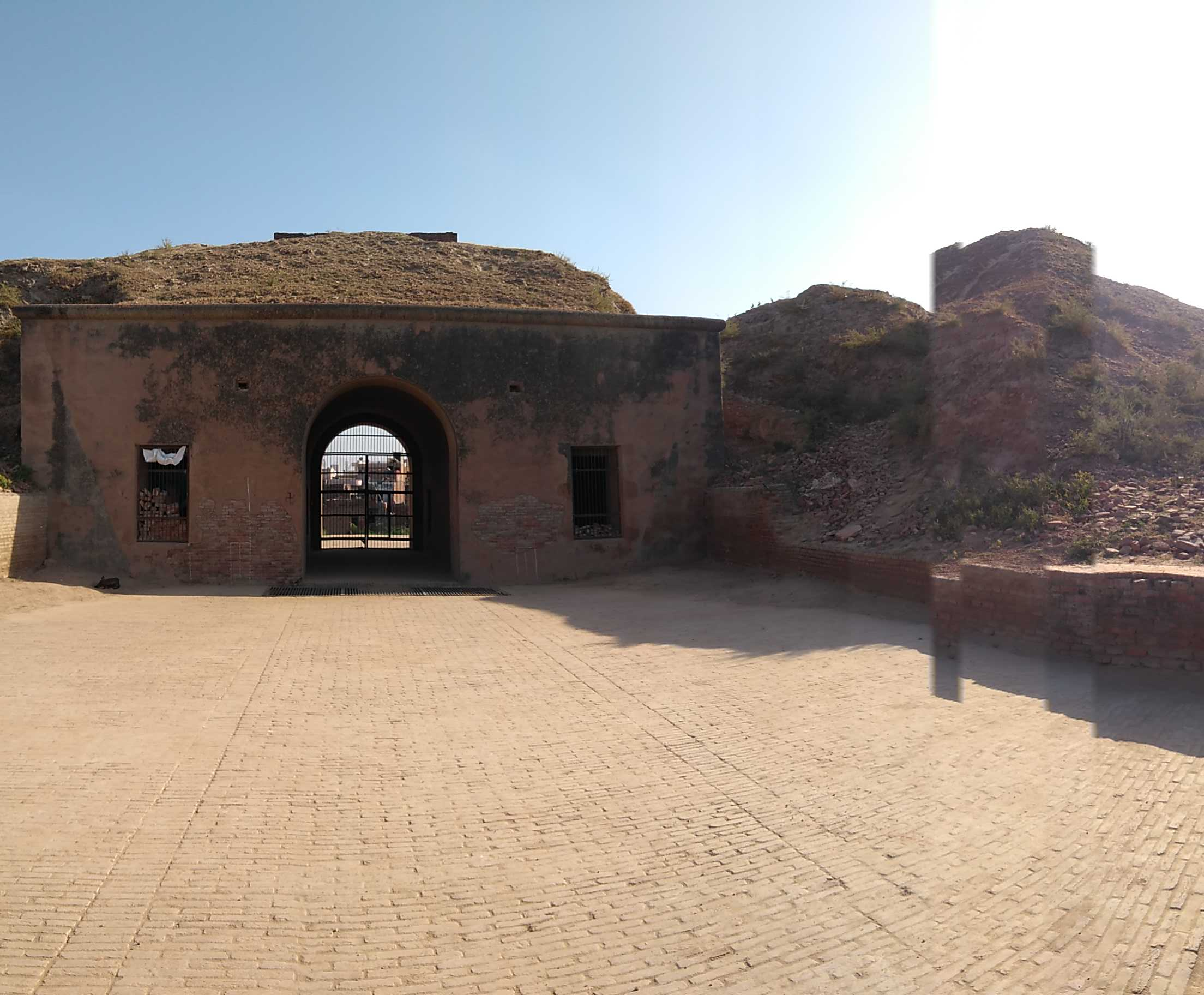

- Location within Haryana Location within India
- 29°6′19″N 75°57′47″E
- Location: Hansi, Haryana, India

History
- Built: 11th century
- Built for: Jatwan
- Demolished: 1857

Site notes
- Height: 52 ft (16 m)
- Area: 30 acres (12 ha)
- Architectural style: Hindu
- Restored: 1937
- Restored by: Archaeological Survey of India
- Governing body: Archaeological Survey of India

Asigarh Fort, also called Hansi Fort, is located on the eastern bank of Amti lake in Hansi city of Haryana, India, about 135 km from Delhi on NH9. Spread over 30 acres, in its prime days this fort used to be in control of 80 forts in the area around it. The fort is said to be one of the most impregnable forts of ancient India and has been declared a centrally protected monument by ASI in 1937.

== Etymology ==
Asigarh is known as the Fort of Swords, from Asi (sword) and garh (fort), as this was the centre of sword making from the ancient times of Tomar Rajput rulers.

There are several names used for the fort in different anecdotes, such as Asidurga, Asigarh, Asika, A-sika, Ansi, Hansi, etc.

== History ==
=== Earlier Fort ===
Hansi fort or Asigarh Fort has long history with little clarity about the earlier period. The excavation of ancient coins belong to the BCE period shows that there have been long history of settlements on the mound on which fort is built.

=== Tomaras- Builder and first rulers of present Asigarh Fort ===
As per British library, Hansi city is believed to have been founded by Anangpal Tomar (Anangpal II), the Tomara dynasty king of Delhi. The son of King Anangpal Tomar, Drupad established a sword manufacturing factory in this fort, hence it is also called "Asigarh". Swords from this fort were exported as far away as to Arab countries. As per Talif-e-Tajkara-e-Hansi by Qazi Sharif Husain in 1915, around 80 forts across the area were controlled from this centre "Asigarh".

The Tomar Empire during the reign of Anangpal II extended over various parts of Delhi, Haryana, Punjab, Himachal Pradesh, Uttar Pradesh, Madhya Pradesh and Rajasthan. In addition to the Asigarh (Hansi), other important places of this dynasty were Sthaneshwar (Thanesar), Sonkh (Mathura), Taragarh, Gopachal(Gwalior), Tanwarhinda (Bhatinda), Tanwarghaar, Pathankot - Nurpur, Patan - Tanwarawati, Nagarkot (Kangra),

Multiple (three) Tomara kings seem to have shared the name "Anangapala" (IAST: Anaṅgapāla). Around 1000 CE, Asigarh, Haryana and Delhi were in control of emperors of Tomara dynasty, when in 1014 Mahmud Ghazni attacked Thanesar and Hansi where he mass destroyed Hindu temples, and again in 1025 he also attacked Somnath temple. Mahmud Ghazni had sent his son Mas'ud I of Ghazni to attack Hansi in 1037 CE, when Masud attacked swordsmen of Hansi and took Hindu women into slavery who were later sold at Gazni. In 1041 in revenge for murder of his father, Mahmud Ghazni's nephew Mawdud of Ghazni (r. 1041-50 CE) seized the throne from his uncle Mahmud Ghazni. Kumarpal Tomar (Mahipal Tomar) of Tomara dynasty who ruled this area from Delhi in the 11th century recaptured Hansi and Thanesar regions from Mawdud, and based on fragmentary Tomar inscriptions discovered from Mahipalpur in Delhi it has been theorized that Mahipala established a new capital at Mahipalapura (now Mahipalpur).

=== Chauhan rule ===
According to the Bijolia inscription of Someshvara of Chauhan dynasty, his brother Vigraharaja IV had captured Dhillika (Delhi) and Ashika (Hansi). He probably defeated the Tomar king Anangapala III. Additions were made to the fort by Prithviraj Chauhan in the 12th century.

=== Muslim rule ===
In 1192, after the defeat of Prithviraj Chauhan by Mohammed Gauri, Hindu rule ended in Hansi. After that the Battle of Bagar took place in which Jatwan besieged the Muslim commander Nasrat Uddin at Hansi in 1192 CE, shortly after the defeat of Prithviraj. On receiving this news Qutb-ud-din marched twelve farsakhs, i.e., about 40 miles during one night. Jatwan raised the siege of Hansi and prepared for an obstinate conflict. "The armies attacked each other" says the author of Taj-ul-Maasir "like two hills of steel, and the field of battle (on the borders of the Bager country) became tulip-dyed with the blood of warriors. Jatwan had his standards of God-plurality and ensigns of perdition lowered by the hand of power". And the Ghurid forces took control of the fort.

=== Sikh and Maratha rule ===
In 1705, during the time of Aurangzeb, Guru Gobind Singh toured Hansi to inspired the people to revolt against the oppressive Mughal rule. In 1707, Baba Banda Singh Bahadur attacked Hansi. In 1736, the fort was under Maratha rule. In 1780s Maharaja Jassa Singh Ramgarhia also took this area under his control for some years as a Maratha vassal and then left.

=== British colonial rule ===
From 1798 to 1801, George Thomas, an Irish immigrant who rose from an ordinary sailor, usurped the area around Hansi and made Asigarh fort his capital.

In 1803 after the Anglo-Maratha Wars, the British East India Company rule seized the fort, but did not take control until 1810 and after which they controlled it till independence of India in 1947.

The fort was again built by George Thomas in 1798 when he carved out his own kingdom consisting of Hisar and Rohtak districts with capital at Hansi.

In 1803 Hansi was also the headquarters of Colonel James Skinner CB (1778 – 4 December 1841) the Anglo-Indian military adventurer in India, who founded 1st Skinner's Horse and 3rd Skinner's Horse at Hansi in 1803. These units are still part of the Indian Army. in 1818 was granted a jagir of Hansi (Hisar district, Haryana), yielding Rs 20,000 a year.

Hansi took an active part in the Sepoy Mutiny (Gadar), Lala Hukam Chand Jain was martyred in 1857 by Britishers.

British Indian Army built a cantonment in this fort after George Thomas surrendered to British Raj in 1803. During the revolt of 1857, the cantonment was abandoned and the fort was damaged. The prisoners of the Kuka movement were imprisoned in this fort during the 1880s.

== Fort details ==
The fort is said to be one of the most impregnable forts of ancient India. The walls of the fort are 52 feet (16 m) high and 37 feet (11 m) thick. At the south end of the fort is a big gate added later by George Thomas. The carvings on the walls assign it to be of Hindu origin.

=== Main gate ===
The main gate has the beautiful carvings of birds, animals and Hindu deities.

=== Baradari ===
Long pillared structure with a flat roof is situated on the top of the mound and is known as Baradari.

=== Char Qutub Dargah ===
A mosque is also located inside the fort complex which was added after the defeat of Prithviraj Chauhan.

=== Excavations ===
The ancient coins of the period before Christ were found here. 57 bronze images of Jain thirthankars were found during excavation in the fort. A statue of the Buddha was excavated here. In February 1982, a large hoard - known as Hansi hoard - of Jaina bronzes including idols belonging to the Gupta period (319 to 605 CE) and 7th–8th centuries (a period belonging to the emperor Harshavardhana's Pushyabhuti dynasty, c. 500 to 647 CE) were discovered.

== See also ==
- List of Monuments of National Importance in Haryana
- List of State Protected Monuments in Haryana
- Hansi hoard

== Bibliography ==
- Barnett, Lionel (1999). Antiquities of India. Atlantic.
- Dilip Kumar Ganguly (1984). History and Historians in Ancient India. Abhinav. p. 117. ISBN 978-0-391-03250-7.
- Khan, Iqtidar Alam (2007). "Ganda Chandella". Historical Dictionary of Medieval India. Scarecrow Press.
- P. C. Roy (1980). The Coinage of Northern India. Abhinav. ISBN 9788170171225.
- Upinder Singh (2008). A History of Ancient and Early Medieval India: From the Stone Age to the 12th Century. Pearson Education India. ISBN 978-81-317-1120-0.
