= Dehra Temple =

Temple in Haryana, India

Dehra temple
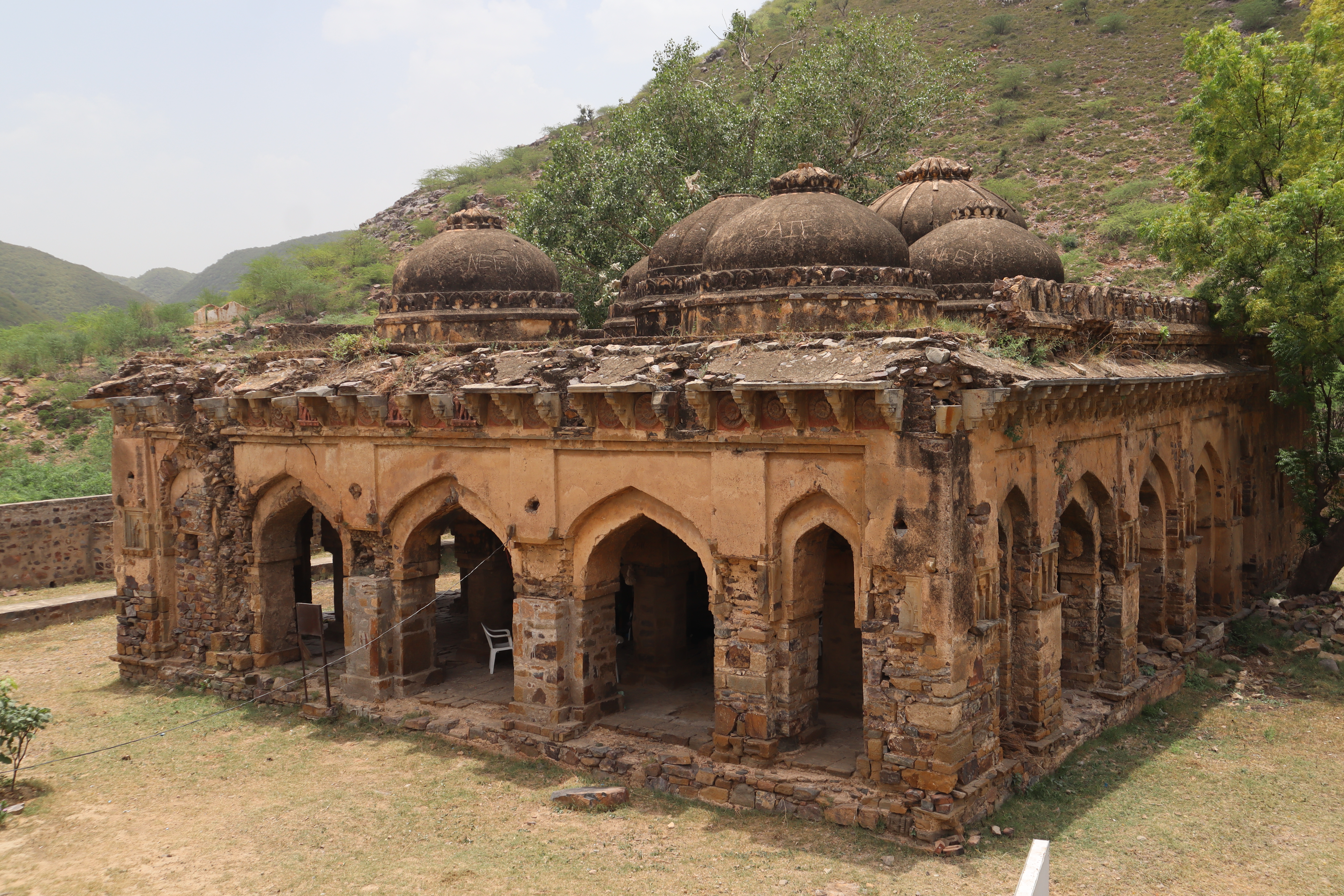
- Dehra temple

- Dehra temple

Religion
- Affiliation: Jainism, Hinduism
- Deity: Ajitanatha, Shiva
- Festivals: Mahavir Jayanti, Nuh

Location
- Location: Bhond village, Delhi
- Interactive map of Dehra temple
- Coordinates: 27°46′53.2″N 76°55′7.4″E

Architecture
- Established: 10th century
- Temple: 1

Dehra Temple, state protected monument and a Hindu-Jain temple in Aravalli foothills forest, at Bhond village off the NH-248A and Delhi–Mumbai Expressway, 2 km west of Ferozepur Jhirka in Nuh district of Haryana state in India. The temple lies 100 km south of IGI Delhi Airport and 200 km north of Jaipur Airport on Delhi-Jaipur section of Golden Triangle (Delhi-Jaipur-Agra tourist circuit).

== History ==
Original temple was built in 10th century. However, temple also has an inscription from 1451 CE (Samvat 1508) on the upper portion of the entrance of the pillared hall (Sabhamandapa) of the temple.

== Temple ==
=== Deity ===
Along with the Jain idols, temple also had Shiva lingam which was later relocated to Jain temple in Firozpur Jhirka. This temple consists of three distinct sanctumsanctorums for the three Jain tirthankars (likely second Tirthankar Ajitanatha; a pillared hall for prayer which had 4 statues of elephants atop the door, surrounded by a circumambulatory wall and path (Pradakshinapath). Temple, built on a plinth, has a stepped gateway with wall enclosure. Arched gateway also has 4 chambers on both sides as well as a narrow stair on the east side which goes to the top of gateway, all accessible from inside of the temple. East of outer wall is an underground chamber with arched entrance.

The temple had the 3 deity image of Thirthankra. Later these were removed and placed it in the Jain Temple at Firozpur Jhirka.

=== Architecture ===
The temple architecture appears to be heavily influenced by Hindu as well as then prevailing Lodhi style architecture of Delhi Sultanate.

== Conservation ==
Temple, which was earlier in a state of neglect and ruin negatively affecting its historical architecture and sanctity, is being progressively restored by the Haryana government since 2024 with a budget of ₹50 million (US$520,000). The temple, which was suffering from serious structural issues such as bulging of masonry and deterioration of roof, was restored with traditional materials, such as lime mortar, by repairing and waterproofing the roof, repairing garbhgriha and pradikshanpath path, re-paving the decayed floor and courtyard matching the original red sandstone, repairing the damaged masonry, reconstruction of outer cells and collapsed domed chambers, re-plastering of walls, and building a stone fence around the temple guarded by a security guard.

== See also ==
- List of State Protected Monuments in Haryana
- Jainism in Haryana
- Tourism in Haryana
- Tourism in India
