= Hansi hoard =

Set of Jain sculptures

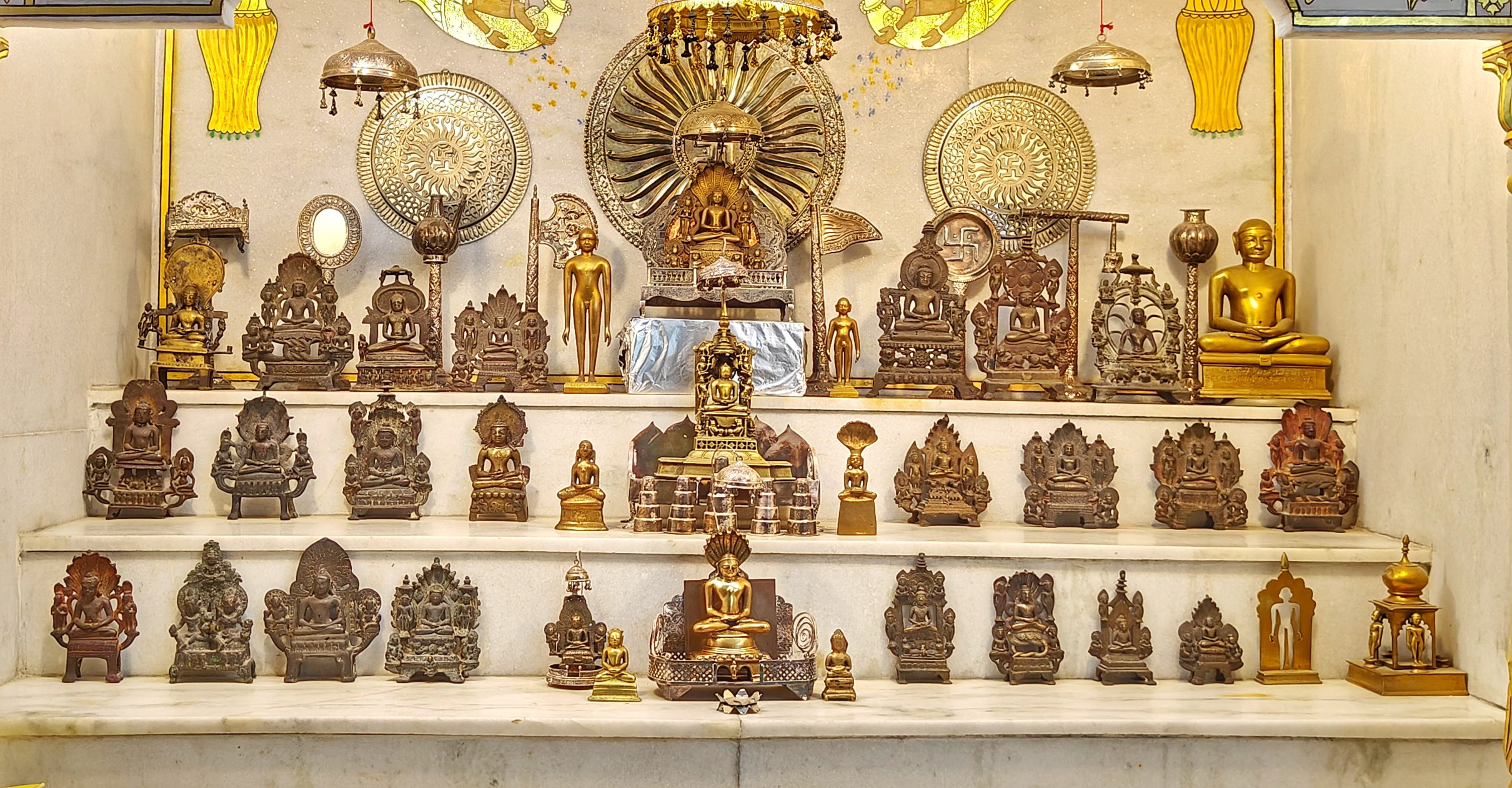
- Hansi hoard inside Hansi Jain temple
- Year: 8th—9th century
- Medium: Bronze

The Hansi hoard is a significant archaeological collection of 58 bronze idols primarily depicting Jain ford-makers (tirthankaras), accidentally discovered inside the Asigarh Fort in Hansi, Haryana, in 1982. Paleographical analysis dates the antiquities to the 8th and 9th centuries CE. Historical evidence suggests the idols were actively worshipped before being hastily buried in a copper container to protect them from the 1037 CE invasion by Masʽud I of Ghazni. Today, the collection is enshrined at the Punyoday Jain temple in Hansi, following a brief period at the Chandigarh Museum and a dramatic theft and recovery incident in 2005.

== Discovery and historical context ==
On January 19, 1982, local children playing inside the Asigarh Fort accidentally uncovered the hoard, prompting a full excavation by the Archaeological Survey of India (ASI). The excavated collection consists of 58 bronze images belonging to both the Digambara and Śvētāmbara Jain traditions. Archaeologists noted that several idols still bore coatings of sandalwood paste, indicating they were in active ritual worship right up until their burial. Historians conclude that local devotees hastily sealed the idols in a copper container and buried them underground to safeguard them from the impending 1037 CE invasion of Hansi by Masʽud I, the son of Mahmud of Ghazni.

== Art and iconography ==
The bronze collection is celebrated for its intricate craftsmanship and features prominent ford-makers (tirthankaras) such as Rishabhanatha, Māllīnātha, Chandraprabha, and Mahavira, alongside rare archaeological depictions of the parents of the Jinas. One of the most notable masterpieces is an elaborate idol of Neminatha seated in the lotus position (padmasana). The idol's pedestal is heavily detailed, featuring six miniature ford-makers (tirthankaras) in the standing meditative posture (kayotsarga), flanked by the male guardian deity (yaksha) Gomedha and the female guardian deity (yakshi) Ambika.

The hoard also contains a highly renowned, large-scale idol of the Jain goddess of knowledge (Shrutidevi), Sarasvati. Notably, the collection unexpectedly included a Buddhist image of Avalokiteśvara alongside various ritual worship implements.

== Modern history and theft ==
Following their excavation, the bronzes were initially housed at the local Digambar Jain Panchayati temple before being transferred to the Chandigarh Museum for preservation. On December 30, 1991, the entire collection was officially returned to the Jain community and is currently enshrined at the Punyoday Jain temple in Hansi.

On October 26, 2005, the entire hoard was mysteriously stolen from the temple. The antiquities were successfully recovered 36 days later from a waterworks facility in the local Mahabir Colony. Police arrested six suspects with prior criminal records, who confessed to abandoning the priceless idols after failing to find illicit buyers.

== See also ==
- Vasantgarh hoard
- Akota Bronzes
- Chausa hoard
