= Asi (Mahabharata) =

Sword in Hindu mythology

Asi (Sanskrit: असि, romanized: Asi) appears as a personification of the first weapon ever created according to Hindu epics. 'Asi' means 'sword'. A legend concerning Asi appears in the Shanti Parva book of the Mahabharata. In Rigvedic Sanskrit, Asi is still used as a term for a kind of sacrificial dagger or knife.

== Legend ==
Out of curiosity, Nakula, the fourth son of Pandu and the master of swordsmanship, questioned the Kuru grandsire Bhishma on his arrow death bed as to which was the best weapon in all kinds of fighting. In his own personal views, Nakula thought the sword to be the most superior since even on having lost one's bow, horse and chariot, a skillful swordsman could still defend himself against the mace and spear wielders. Nakula further queried the grandsire about the origin and purpose of the Khadga, as well as about its first acharya ("teacher, preceptor").

Gladdened by these intelligent queries by Nakula, Bhishma related to him the complete Itihasa (Sanskrit term for 'History') of the Khadga or "divine sword" starting from its creation down to the present.

=== Creation of Asi ===
The devas approached Brahma, the creator of the universe, in ancient time, and protested against the unjust rule and evil doings of the demons (danavas). Hearing the protest from the deities, Brahma collected sacrificial objects and proceeded to perform a grand sacrifice with the foremost of the rishis and devas at the side of Himalaya.

During the course of the sacrifice, a dreadful creature sprang from the midst of the sacrificial fires, scattering flames all around. It was as though a moon had arisen in the midst of the stars. He was coloured like a deep-blue lotus. His teeth were sharp and terrible, his stomach lean and skinny, and his stature very tall and slim. He was of exceeding energy and power. Simultaneously, the earth started shaking, there was turmoil in the ocean, the forceful winds started howling all around, the trees started falling and being torn apart, and the meteors started blazing through the skies.

Brahma declared:

The 'being' I have conceived is Asi. It shall effect the destruction of the enemies of the gods and restore the Dharma.

Upon this, the creature assumed the form of a blazing sharp-edged sword, glowing like flames. This sword was the primordial weapon created by the deities for the destruction of evil. The name of the sword was Asi, the personification and the primary energy behind all weapons ever created. As per Bhishma, the constellation under which the sword was born is Krittik; Agni is its deity; Rohini is its Gotra; Rudra is its high preceptor and whoever holds this weapon obtains sure victory and will have absolute power over any weapon ever created since Asi is the primordial source of energy behind all weapons.

=== Succession of wielders of Asi ===
Brahma gave that sword to Shiva, and requested him to put down the sinners and evil-doers, and restore the Dharma (righteousness). Shiva, assuming his extreme form, took up the sword and started the war against the Danavas, the enemies of the Devas. The earth became miry with flesh and blood of daityas and Shiva destroyed the entire community of daityas.

Shiva gave the sword to Vishnu. Over the course of time, Vishnu gave the sword to Marichi, and Marichi gave it to all the great Rishis. The Rishis gave the sword to Vasava, who gave it to the Regents of the world. The Regents gave the sword to Manu, the son of Surya. In time, Manu installed his own son, Kshupa, as the sovereignty of all creatures and gave him the sword for their protection. From Kshupa, it was taken by Ikshvaku and from Ikshvaku, by Pururavas. From Pururavas, it was taken by Ayus, and from Ayus by Nahusha. From Nahusha, it was taken by Yayati, and from Yayati by Puru. From Puru, it was taken by Amurtarya. From Amurtarya, it descended to Bhumisaya. From Bhumisaya, it was taken by Dushyanta's son, Bharata. From Bharata, it was taken by the righteous Ailavila. From Ailavila, it was taken by king Dhundumara. From Dhundumara, it was taken by Kamvoja, and from Kamvoja, it was taken by Muchukunda. From Muchukunda, it was taken by Marutta, and from Marutta, by Raivata. From Raivata, it was taken by Yuvanashva, and from Yuvanashva, by Raghu. From Raghu, it was taken by Harinashva. From Harinashva, the sword was taken by Sunaka, and from Sunaka by the righteous-souled Usinara. From Usinara, it was taken by the Bhojas and the Yadus. From the Yadus, it was taken by Sivi. From Sivi, it descended to Pratardana, of Kashi. From Pratardana, it was received by Ashtaka, and from Ashtaka by Prishadaswa. From Prishadaswa, it was received by Bharadvaja. From Bharadvaja, his son Drona obtained the sword. Drona used this weapon in the famous Kurukshetra War described in the epic Mahabharata. Drona became unconquerable in the Kurukshetra War because he held Asi, the primordial weapon.

After the death of Drona, the sword was taken by Kripacharya. Kripacharya gifted the sword to Nakula. From Nakula, the sword went to Parikshit, and from Parikshit, it went to Janamejaya. From Janamejaya, it went to his son Satanika. Satanika, who studied the Vedas under Yajnyawalkya, and military science from Kripacharya, became dissatisfied with sensual enjoyments. Satanika obtained spiritual knowledge from the instructions of Saunaka and ultimately obtained salvation. Asi, the sword, again went back to Kripacharya for safe keeping until the return of the rightful owner, Dronacharya's son, Ashwatthama.

== See also ==
- Asigarh Fort
