= Jatwan =

Chieftain of present-day Haryana

Jatwan was a chieftain of present-day Haryana who rebelled against Qutb ud-Din Aibak of the Delhi Sultanate in 1192 CE. He finds a mention in Hasan Nizami's Tajul-Ma'asir, according to which the Delhi army defeated and killed him on the border of Bagar region.

== Allegiance ==
Henry Miers Elliot thought Jatwan to be a leader of Jats, a claim repeated by later writers. For example, Kalika Ranjan Qanungo believed that Jatwan led a Jat rebellion against Aibak. However, the contemporary writer Hasan Nizami, who provides information about Jatwan's rebellion, does not state this. Elliot's guess appears to be based on the similarity of the words "Jatwan" and "Jat", and the rebellion's locality, where Jats can be found.

According to S.H. Hodivala, "Jatwan" is a mistranscription of the "Chahwan" in the manuscript, and the rebel was probably a Chahamana (Chawhan or Chauhan) subordinate of Prithviraja III. According to Rima Hooja, it is probably a corrupt form of the name "Jaitra".

== Rebellion against Qutb-ud-din Aibak ==
Jatwan besieged the Muslim commander at Hansi in 1192 CE, shortly after the defeat of Prithviraj. On receiving this news Qutb-ud-din marched twelve farsakhs, i.e., about 40 miles during one night. Jatwan raised the siege of Hansi and prepared for an obstinate conflict. "The armies attacked each other" says the author of Taj-ul-Maasir "like two hills of steel, and the field of battle (on the borders of the Bager country) became tulip-dyed with the blood of warriors. Jatwan had his standards of God-plurality and ensigns of perdition lowered by the hand of power".
