= Saunkh =

- Town
- Saunkh Location of Saunkh, near Mathura
- Location within Uttar Pradesh Location within India
- Coordinates: 27.395°N 77.494°E
- Country: India
- State: Uttar Pradesh
- District: Mathura

Population (2011)
  - Total: 9,556

Languages
  - Official: Hindi
- Time zone: UTC+5:30 (IST)
- Postal code: 281123
- Website: npsonkh.in

Saunkh, often spelled as Sonkh, is a town and a Nagar Panchayat in Mathura district of Uttar Pradesh, India.

== Archaeology ==
The site is well known for archaeological excavations led by Herbert Härtel in 1969–70. Numerous artefacts recovered from Sonkh are visible in the Mathura Museum. Stratigraphical analysis at Sonkh and other sites has shown that the area of Mathura was almost undeveloped and Mathura was mostly a hamlet before the Mauyra era.

Coins of the Mitra dynasty were found in Sonkh, corresponding to layers dated to about 150-50 BCE, at a time when the Indo-Greeks ruled over the region. The earliest Mitra coins are those of Gomitra (150-50 BCE).

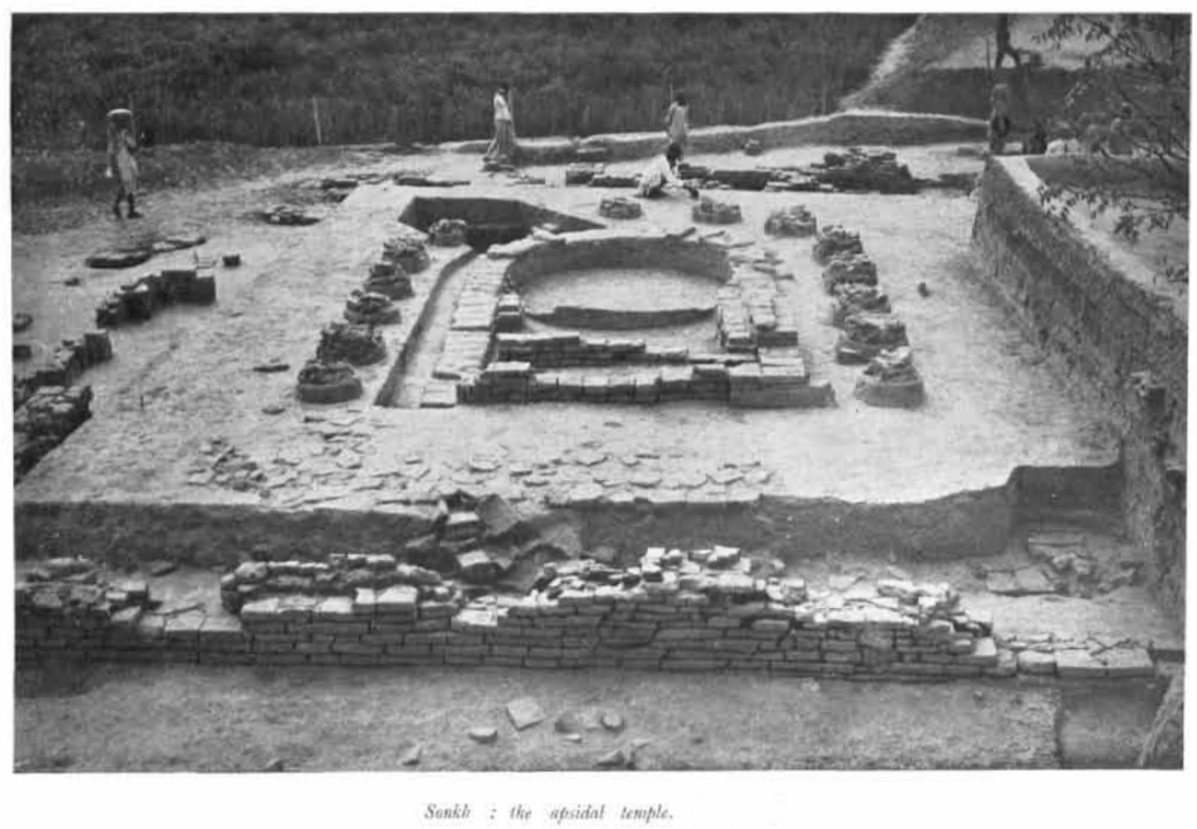
Sonkh Apsidal Temple, a Nāga shrine.

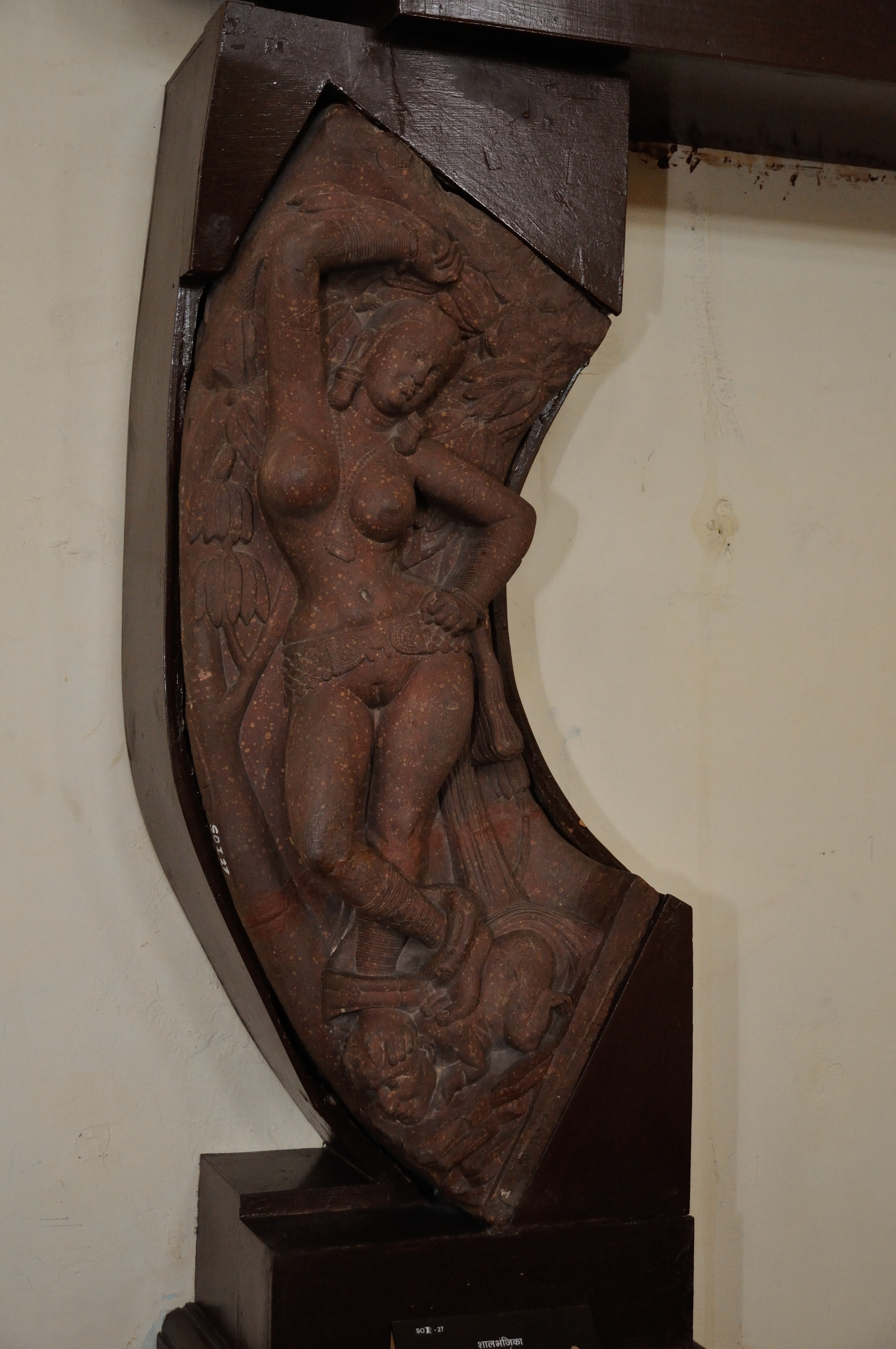
Salabhanjika sculpture

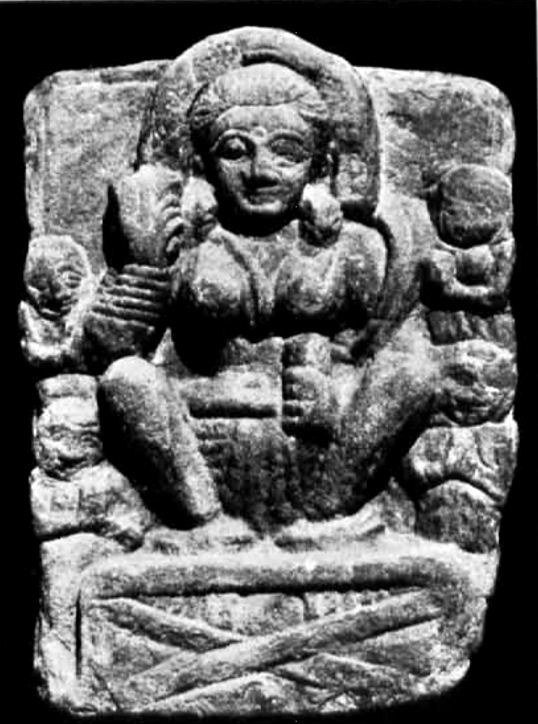
Sonkh Matrika statuette

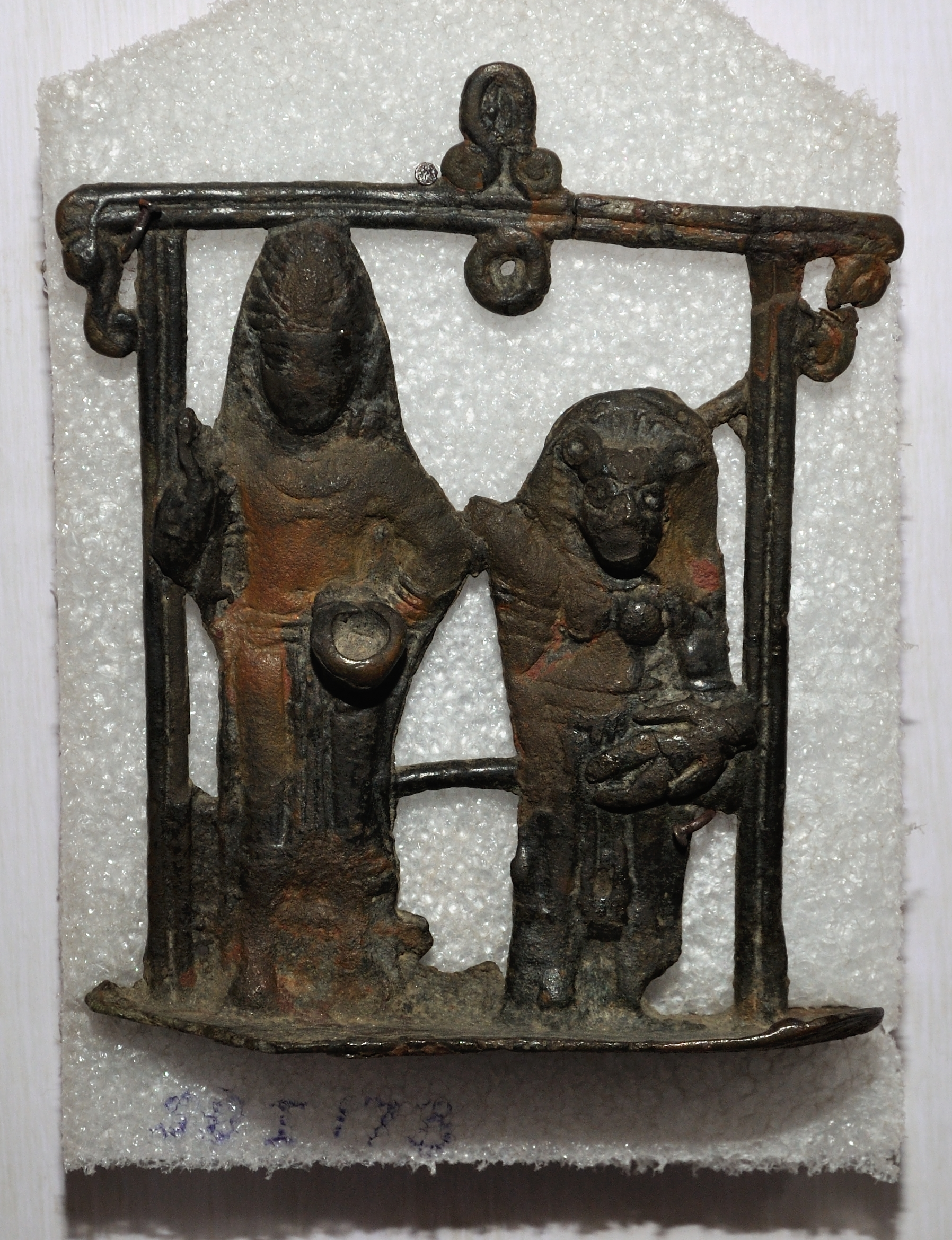
Sonkh bronze image of Kubera and Hariti. Kushan period

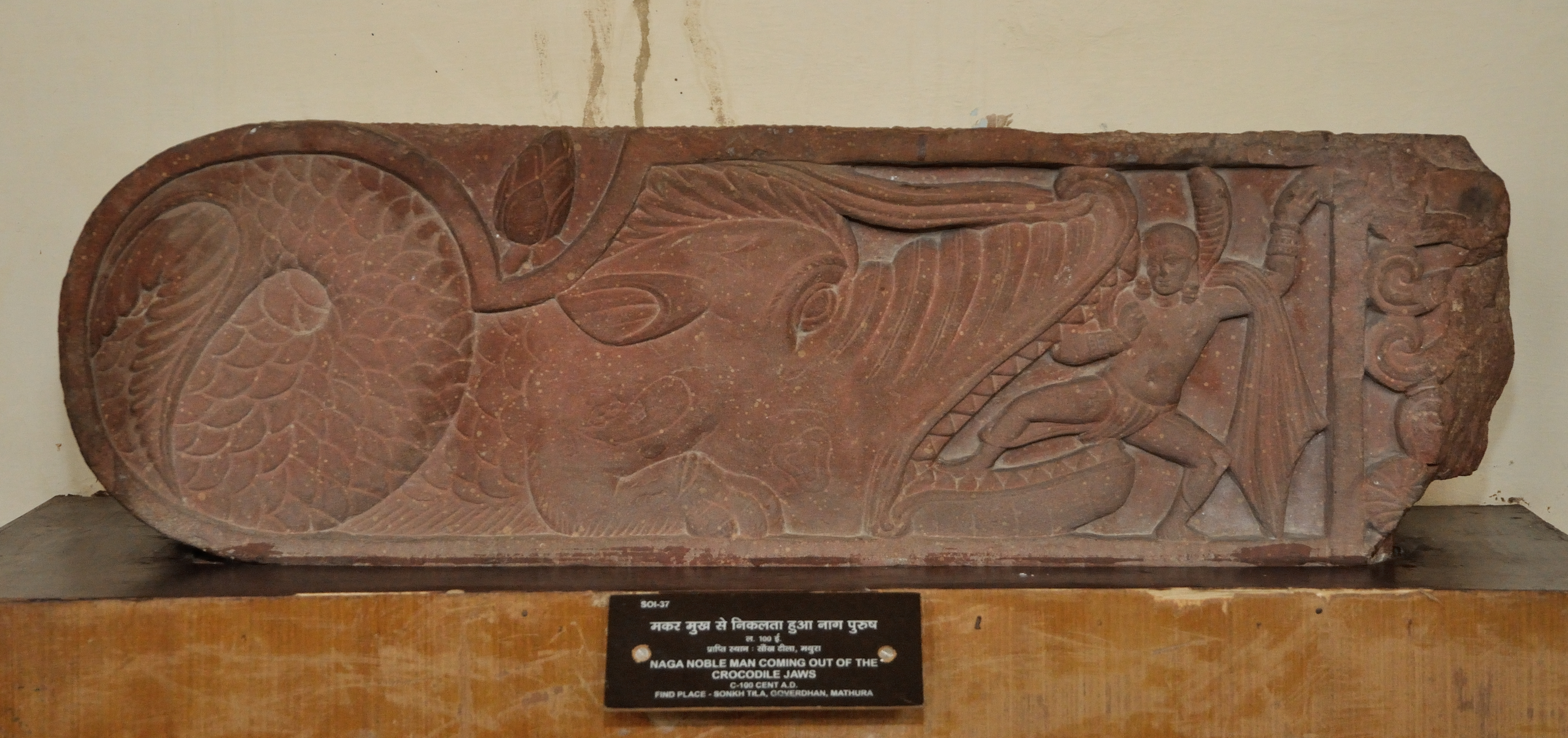
Naga Noble Man Coming Out of Crocodile Jaws. Circa 100 CE

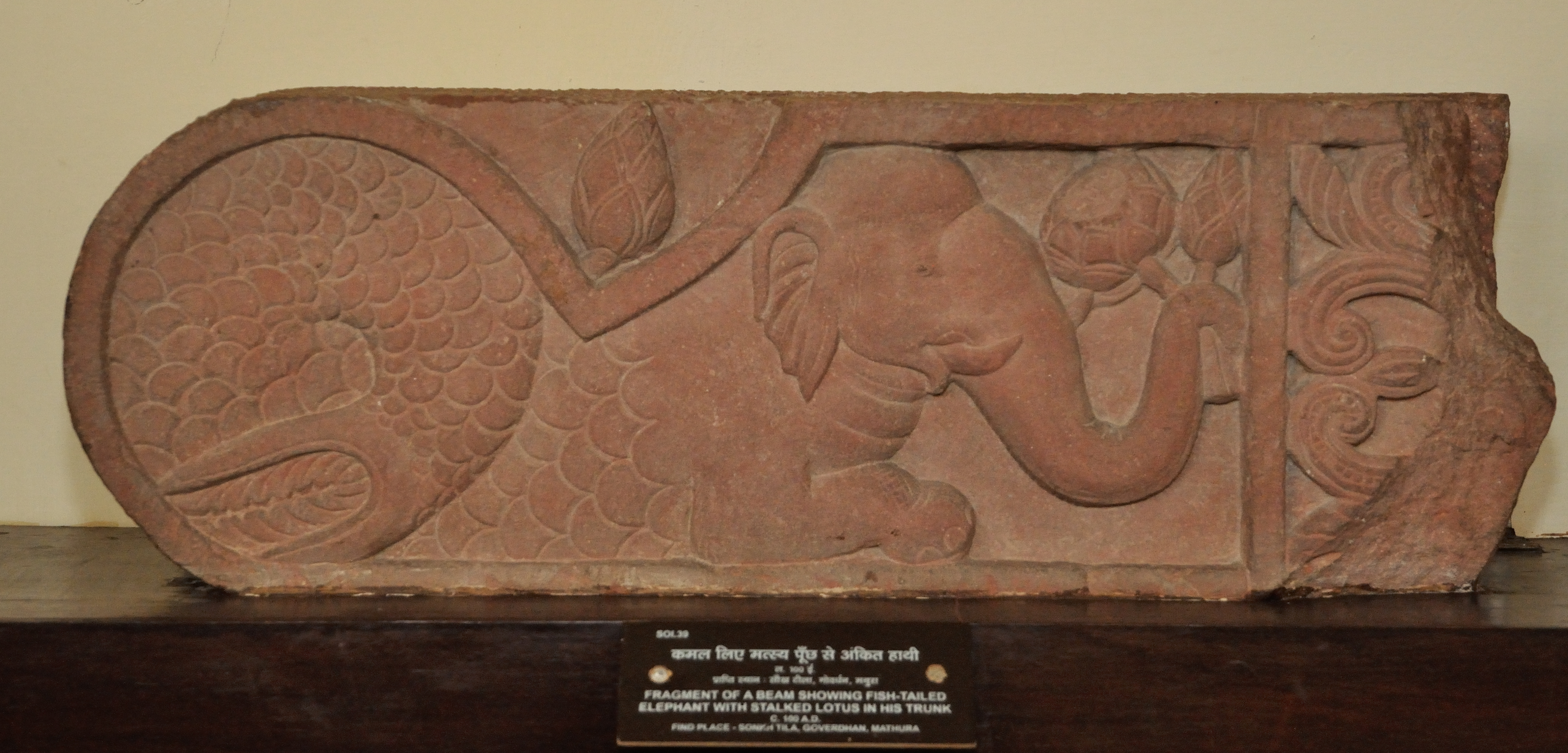
Fragment of Beam Showing Fish-tailed Elephant with Stalked Lotus in His Trunk. Circa 100 CE

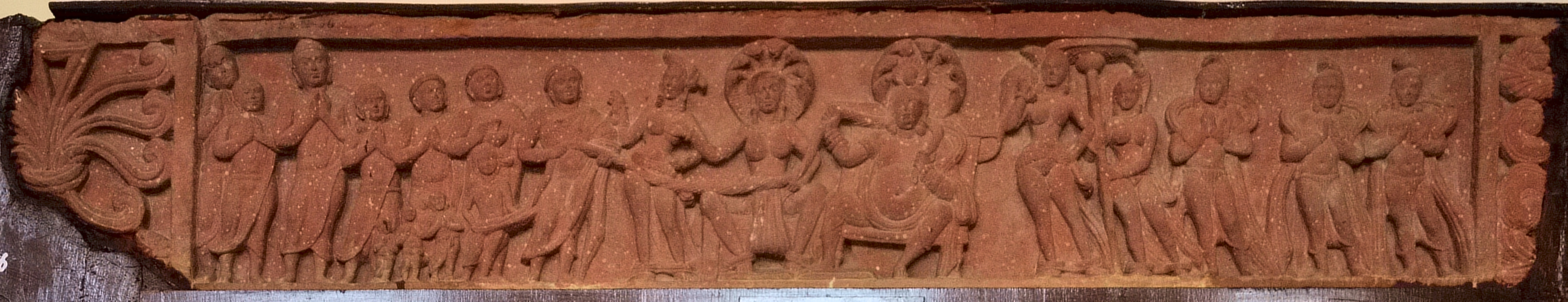
Naga Court, Sonkh, Mathura, 100 CE

== History ==
In year 1805 when British occupied this area, the land of several parganas of Mathura like: Mat, Mahaban, Sonai, Raya, Hasangarh, Shahpau, Khadauli, Sahabad and Sonkh was generally owned by a Jats.

During the time of Aurengzeb, Sonkh, Weir, Sinsini and Sogor were 4 stronghold of Jats in the braj region.

During 18th century the mathura district remained under local Jat chiefs. Large tracts was assigned to them as jagirs on a condition of military service.The pargana of Sahar was divided into 4 parts:- Sahar, Sergarh, Konsi and Shahpur and that of Mangtala split up into Sonkh and Sonsa.

According to certain Gosins, Sonkh derives its name from a demon named Sankhasur, but according to local tradition the name is ascribed to a Tomar chief who founded this place in 11th century. After Sonkh had been deserted for many years it was reestablished by Alhad a Jat, whose 5 sons divided it into as many portions each.

"According to local tradition it was first founded in the time of Anang Pal of Delhi, probably the same Tomar chief who has left other traces of his name at son, Sonsa and Sonoth. The ancestor of the present community was a Jat by name Alhad, whose five sons--- Asa, Ajal, Purna, Tasiha and Sahjua--- divided their estates into as many separate shares, which still bear their names".

— Drake-brockman, d. L. Comp., Muttra, a Gazetter Being, vol.7

A mud fort was built by a Jat Chief named Hathi Singh at the time of Maharaja Surajmal or Sawai Jawahar Singh of bharatpur.

It is said that the clan of Chief Hathi Singh was also Tomar, but proper reliable source are very few.

Anangpal Tomar brought the iron pillar from Saunkh and got it fixed in Delhi in the year 1052 as evident from the inscriptions on it. After the fixing of Iron Pillar (Killi) in delhi, coins in the name of "Shree Killi Dev Pal" were also minted by him. By assuming the iron pillar as center, numerous palaces and temples were built and finally the fort Lal Kot was built around them.
