= Hansi =

Municipal council in Hansi district, Haryana, India

- City
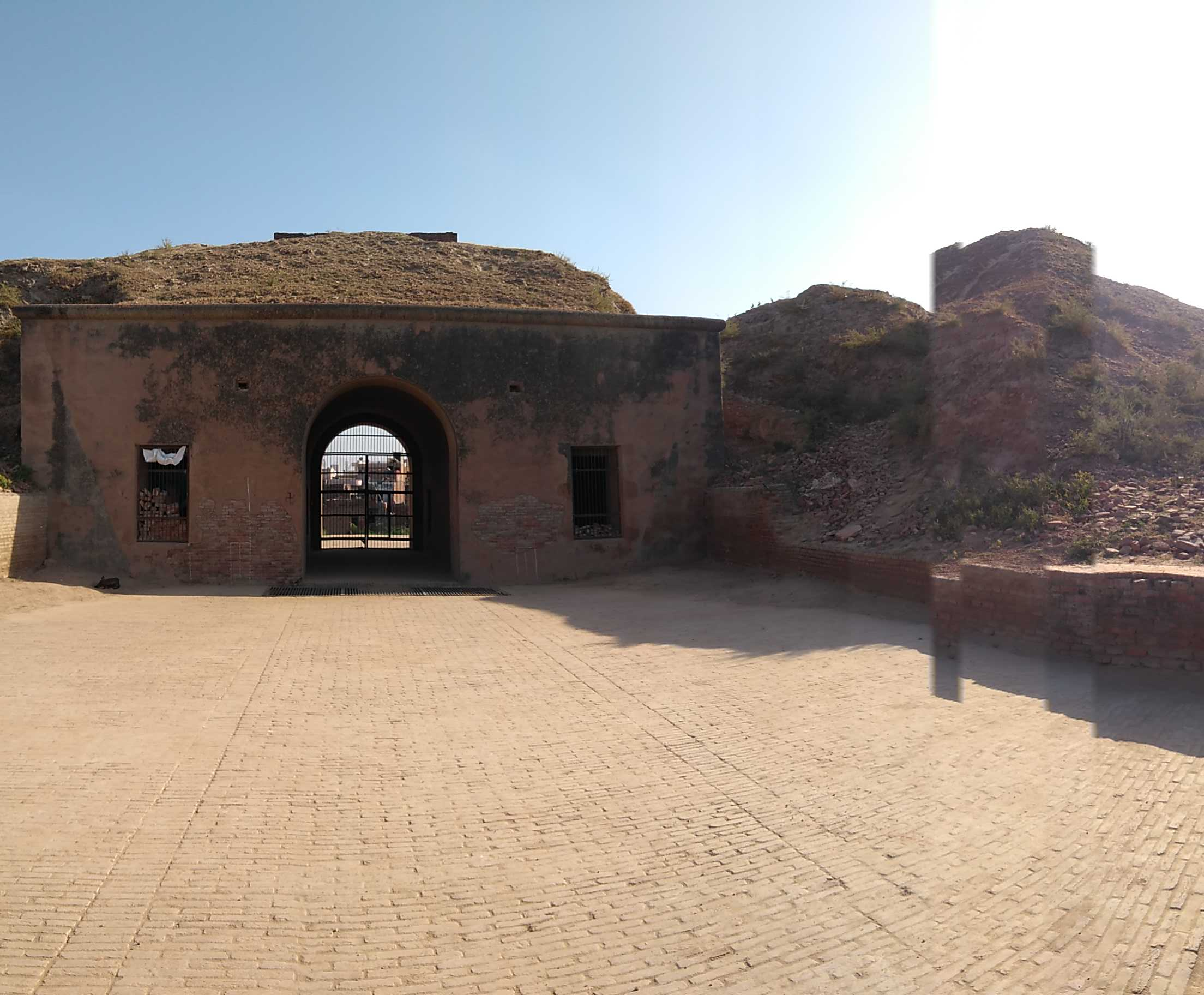
- Hansi Fort

- Location within Haryana Location within India
- Coordinates: 29.1°N 75.97°E
- Country: India
- State: Haryana
- District: Hansi

Government
  - Type: Municipal council
- Elevation: 207 m (679 ft)

Population (2011)
  - Total: 86,770

Languages
  - Official: Haryanvi, Hindi
- Time zone: UTC+5:30 (IST)
- PIN: 125033
- Telephone code: 01663
- ISO 3166 code: IN-HR
- Vehicle registration: HR 21
- Website: haryana.gov.in

Hansi, is a historically important city and municipal council in the Hansi district of the Indian state of Haryana. Earlier Hansi was larger, more prosperous and more important city than Hisar, as evident by several important buildings of archeological importance. Hansi is also known for its famous sweet, peda, which is made from milk.

== History ==
Dr. Bhup Singh, historian, has written Hansi ka Etias (lit. History of Hansi), a book published by Rotary International.

=== Early and classic period ===
Hansi hoard, a large hoard of Jaina bronzes was accidentally discovered at Hansi in February 1982. These include idols that may belong to the Gupta period (319 to 605 CE), while most belonged to the 7th–8th centuries. They were apparently buried underground before the impending attack by Mahmud of Ghazni's son Mas'ud I of Ghazni in 1037 CE. Masud attacked swordsmen of Hansi and took women into slavery who were later sold at Gazni.

=== Medieval period ===
==== 10-12th century: Tomara-Chauhan period ====
It is believed that Hansi was founded by King Anangpal Vihangpal Tomar for his guru "Hansakar" (957 AD). Later, the son of King Anangpal Tomar, Drupad established a sword manufacturing factory in this fort, hence it is also called "Asigarh". Swords from this fort were exported as far away as to Arab countries. As per Talif-e-Tajkara-e-Hansi by Qazi Sharif Husain in 1915, around 80 forts across the area were controlled from this centre "Asigarh".

A few also say that it was founded by ill daughter Hansivati/Ambavati of Prithvi Raj Chauhan though there exists no proof of Prithiviraj's daughter by that name.

==== 13th-15th century: Sultanate period ====
In 1192, Mohammed Ghori defeated Prithvi Raj Chauhan in the Second Battle of Tarain, in the same year Battle of Bagar took place to occupy Hansi, Jatwan besieged the Muslim commander Nasrat Uddin at Hansi in 1192 CE, shortly after the defeat of Prithviraj. On receiving this news Qutb-ud-din marched twelve farsakhs, i.e., about 40 miles during one night. Jatwan raised the siege of Hansi and prepared for an obstinate conflict. "The armies attacked each other" says the author of Taj-ul-Maasir "like two hills of steel, and the field of battle (on the borders of the Bager country) became tulip-dyed with the blood of warriors. Jatwan had his standards of God-plurality and ensigns of perdition lowered by the hand of power". Hindu rule ended in Hansi.

This was the time when non-Muslims were not permitted to settle here. Slowly, Hansi lost its importance and was remembered only as a fort. Delhi started becoming the center of attention.

=== 16th century onwards: Modern period ===
==== 16th-17th century: Mughal period ====
Hansi is listed in the Ain-i-Akbari as a pargana under Hisar sarkar, producing a revenue of 5,434,438 dams for the imperial treasury and supplying a force of 7000 infantry and 500 cavalry. It had a brick fort at the time.

Shahjahan came to Hansi, met the famous Hindu saint Jagannath Puri Samadha Hansi and after his approval Hindus were allowed to settle in Hansi. In addition to the Hindus, Hansi had Muslims and a few Jains that inhabited Hansi during this Mughal rule.

Jagannath Puri Samadha has also many devotees because of their belief that Jagannath Puri was not a common human being but a supreme being. There are many famous stories of Jagannath Puri like a walkable wall, sweat lotus, and so on.

==== 18th century: Maratha rule ====
Hansi along with small Sikh kingdoms of the Cis-Sutlej states was under influence of Marathas, until the Second Anglo-Maratha War of 1803–1805, after which the Marathas lost this territory to the British.

==== 19-20th century: British colonial rule ====
The area came under British rule after 1803 till 1947. After the Indian Rebellion of 1857, the British Empire crushed over 100 people from Rohnat, Mangali, Hazampur, Jamalpur, Bhatla and other villages under a road roller on the road as punishment for participating in the mutiny. That road is now known as Lal Sadak (literally Red Road or Blood Road) where a monument, on approach road from Hansi to Rohnat Lal Sadak, to the martyrs has been constructed after the independence.

Guru Gobind Singh also came to Hansi in 1705 and inspired the public to revolt against Mughal rule. In 1707, Baba Banda Singh Bahadur attacked Hansi. Hansi was under Maratha rule in 1736 and, after Third Battle of Panipat in 1761, was lost to Ahmed Shah Abdali. Maharaja Jassa Singh Ramgarhia in 1780s also took this area under his control for some years and then left.

George Thomas, an Irish mercenary and raider who rose from an ordinary sailor to become a feudal lord (jagirdar), made Hansi as his capital. Hansi was seized by the British East India Company rule in 1802. From 1819–32, Hansi was a District HQ which was later shifted to Hisar in 1832.

Hansi was also the headquarters of Colonel James Skinner CB (1778 – 4 December 1841) the Anglo-Indian immigrant and mercenary in India, who became known as Sikandar Sahib. 1st Skinner's Horse and 3rd Skinner's Horse (formerly 2nd Skinner's Horse) were founded by Colonel James Skinner at Hansi in 1803. These units are still part of the Indian Army. He also built the Sheikhpura Kothi, on Hansi-Ugalan road off NH9 Hansi bypass, named after his son.

Raham Ali ibn Mohammad Hussain ibn Maulana Abul Khair of Palwal was killed along with Aulia Khan Balooch at Pargana Hansi. Raham Ali was brother-in-law of Qazi Syed Mohammad Rafi.

After the Anglo-Maratha Wars, Hansi came under British rule. Hansi took active part in the 1857 war of liberation (Gadar), Lala Hukam Chand Jain was martyred in 1857 by Britishers.

==== 1947 onwards: Post-independence ====
In 1947 when British India was divided into Pakistan and India, a large number of Muslims including Syeds and Ranghars migrated to Pakistan from Hansi city and their villages (such as Baliali and Khanak). Pakistani cricket player Inzamam-ul-Haq's parents migrated to Pakistan from Hansi after partition.

A proposal to carve out the new Hansi district out of the existing Hisar district had been pending since 2016. On the 16th of December, 2025, present Chief Minister Nayab Singh Saini announced in a public rally that Hansi would become the 23rd district of the Haryana state. The official gazette notification "682-ARIC-03-2025/7392" was released on the 19th of December, making Hansi the 23rd district of the Haryana state. The new district would comprise Hansi-1, Hansi-2 and Narnaund sub-divisions with a total of 110 villages shared amongst them, including villages such as Lohari-Ragho, Rakhi Khas and the village where the oldest civilatisation markers have been found, Rakhigarhi.

== Geography ==
=== Topography ===
Hansi is located at 29.1°N 75.97°E. It has an average elevation of 207metres (679ft) People Density is 348 people per km^2 .Area is 1272.32km^2. It is located at a distance of 26 kilometres (16 mi) east of Hisar on NH-9. Geographically, it is semi-arid with around 46cm of annual rainfall.

=== Historic sites ===
==== Asigarh Fort ====
Asigarh Fort, is a prominent and historic feature of this ancient city. Extended in an area of 30 acres (120,000 m^{2}), it is square in shape and has security posts in all the four corners.

==== Barsi gate ====
The historic city of Hansi had five gates of entry – Delhi Gate (East), Hisar Gate (West), Gosain Gate (North-west), Barsi Gate (South) and Umra Gate (South west). The peculiarity of this town is that its altitude increases after entry from any of the gates. Deserts guard this city towards its west (cities like Tosham, Devsar, Khanak).

During the period of Firoz Shan Tuglaq about 1302, a tunnel was constructed connecting the present Hansi to Hisar. The gate of fort has figures of gods, and pictures of gods, goddesses, birds can also be seen on the walls of the fort. The entry gate of the fort was built by George Thomas. This fort was declared a Protected Monument of National Importance in 1937 by the Archeological Survey, the present ASI, and is still in good condition.

==== 16th century Baba Jagganmathpuri Samadha ====
Baba Jaggannathpuri Samadha temple, a samadhi (revered shrine) dedicated to the 16th century Hindu Sadhu (saint), Jaggannathpuri, at the spot where he established an ashram (monastery) after arriving in Hansi in 1586 CE when there were no Hindus left in Hansi under the Islamic rule. He revived the Hinduism in the area. The complex has the sacred banyan tree with a big floating aerial prop-root branch connected to the grounded main taproot stem, which gives an illusion as if the aerial prop-root branch is floating in the air by itself. Pilgrims tie the sacred red-saffron mauli thread around the stem.

== Demographics ==
As per census of India data, Hansi had a population of 75,730 in 2001, which rose to 86,770 by 2011, and in 2020 its becomes about 93098. In 2011, female sex ratio was 883 per 1000 men and female child sex ratio was 830. In 2011, Hansi had an average literacy rate of 81.06% (68% in 2001), higher than the state average of 75.5%, male literacy is 86.59% (73% in 2001), and female literacy is 74.84% (61% in 2001). In Hansi, 11.41% of the population is under 6 years of age.

=== Religion ===
In 2011, 96.77% of residents are Hindus, 1.34% Jain, 0.99% Sikhs, 0.05% Buddhist, 0.66% Muslim, 0.10% Christian and 0.10% unstated.

Religions in Hansi city (2011)
Religion	Percent
Hinduism	96.77%
Jainism	1.34%
Sikhism	0.99%
Others	0.76%

==== City ====
Religion in Hansi City
Religion	Population (1911)	Percentage (1911)	Population (1941)	Percentage (1941)
Islam	6,907	47.39%	10,166	45%
Hinduism	6,896	47.31%	10,752	47.6%
Sikhism	14	0.1%	80	0.35%
Christianity	7	0.05%	36	0.16%
Others (Note: Including Jainism, Buddhism, Zoroastrianism, Judaism, Ad-Dharmis, or not stated)	752	5.16%	1,556	6.89%
Total Population	14,576	100%	22,590	100%

==== Tehsil ====
Religion in Hansi Tehsil (1941)
Religion	Population (1941)	Percentage (1941)
Hinduism	175,761	78.34%
Islam	45,551	20.3%
Sikhism	165	0.07%
Christianity	56	0.02%
Others (Note: Including Jainism, Buddhism, Zoroastrianism, Judaism, Ad-Dharmis, or not stated)	2,837	1.26%
Total Population	224,370	100%

== Education ==
Colleges are:

- Nehru Memorial Government College, Hansi
- S. D. Mahila Mahavidyalaya, Hansi
- S. D. Higher Secondary School, Hansi

== See also ==
- Asigarh Fort
- Administrative divisions of Haryana
  - Hisar division
  - Hisar
  - Hansi Block
