= Digamber Jain Bada Mandir Hastinapur =

Jain temple complex in Hastinapur, Uttar Pradesh, India

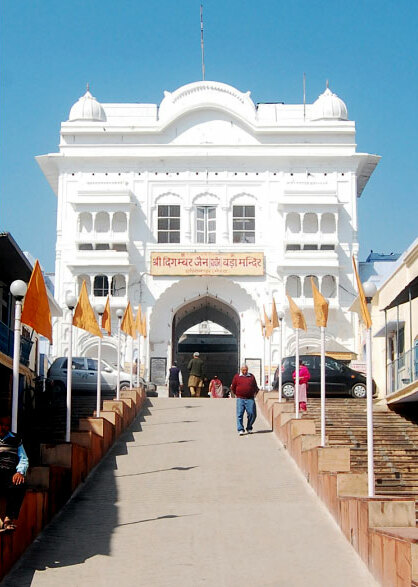
- Main Entrance Gate 'Singh Dwaar' of the Temple Complex

- Location in Uttar Pradesh

Religion
- Affiliation: Jainism
- Sect: Digambara Terapanth
- Deity: Shantinatha
- Festivals: Akshaya Tritiya, Shanti Vidhan, Das Lakshana, Ashtanhika Parv
- Governing body: Shri Digambar Jain Teerth Kshetra Committee
- Year consecrated: 1806

Location
- Location: Hastinapur, Uttar Pradesh
- Administration: Shri Mukesh Jain
- Coordinates: 29°09′40.7″N 78°00′23.6″E

Architecture
- Type: Jain architecture
- Funded by: Raja Harsukh Rai
- Established: 1801

Specifications
- Site area: 40 acre
- Temple: 100+
- Elevation: 224 m (735 ft)

Website
- http://www.jainbaramandirhtr.com/

Digamber Jain Bada Mandir Hastinapur is a Jain temple complex located in Hastinapur, Uttar Pradesh. It is the oldest Jain temple in Hastinapur dedicated to Shantinatha, the 16th Jain Tirthankara.

== History ==
Hastinapur Teerth Kshetra is believed to be the birthplace of 16th, 17th and 18th tīrthaṅkaras namely, Shantinatha, Kunthunatha and Aranatha respectively. Jains also believed that it was here in Hastinapur, the first tīrthaṅkara, Rishabhanatha ended his 13-month-long penance after receiving sugarcane juice (ikshu-rasa) from King Shreyans.

Digamber Jain Bada Mandir is the oldest Jain Temple in Hastinapur. The main temple was built in the year 1801 under the auspices of Raja Harsukh Rai, who was the imperial treasurer of the Emperor Shah Alam II. The 40 acre temple complex encloses a centrally located Mukhya Shikhara surrounded by a group of Jain temples dedicated to various tīrthaṅkara, mostly built in the late 20th century.

== Architecture ==
The principal (Mulanayak) deity in the main temple is of 16th tīrthaṅkara, Shantinatha in Padmasana posture. The altar also has idols of 17th and 18th tīrthaṅkaras, Kunthunatha and Aranatha on each side. In recent year, the temple has observed increase in the number devotees.

Some of the notable monuments and temples in the complex are:

- Manastambha, built in the year 1955, it is a thirty-one feet high structure, situated outside the entrance of the main temple complex.
- Trimurti Mandir, left altar comprises a 12th-century old Shantinatha idol in Kayotsarga posture, Parshvanatha idol in the center and a white color Mahavira idol on the right altar.
- Nandishwardweep, representing an aspect of Jain cosmology was built in the 1980s. Shantinatha and Aranatha idols are installed on both sides of the entrance.
- Samavasarana Rachna, a magnificent structure with 111 small chaityalaya, 4 manastambha, representing the Samavasarana of the 19th tīrthaṅkara, Mallinatha.
- Ambika Devi Temple, an ancient idol of goddess Ambika, recovered from a nearby canal with an image of Neminath carved on the head of goddess.

Other major monuments in the complex are Bahubali Temple, Parshwnath Temple, Jal Mandir, Kirti Stambha and Pandukshila. Shri Digamber Jain Mandir Teeth Kshetra Committee was also set up to manage various Dharamshalas, Bhojnalaya, Jain Library, Acharya Vidyanand Museum and many other facilities for the pilgrims. The Kshetra premises also houses a Post Office, Police Sub-station, Jain Gurukul and an Udaseen ashram. Some other religious sites which comes directly under the administration of Teeth Kshetra Committee are Kailash Parvat Rachna, 24 Tirthankaras Tonks, and a cluster of four ancient Nishiyajis, situated within 1.5 km from the main temple.

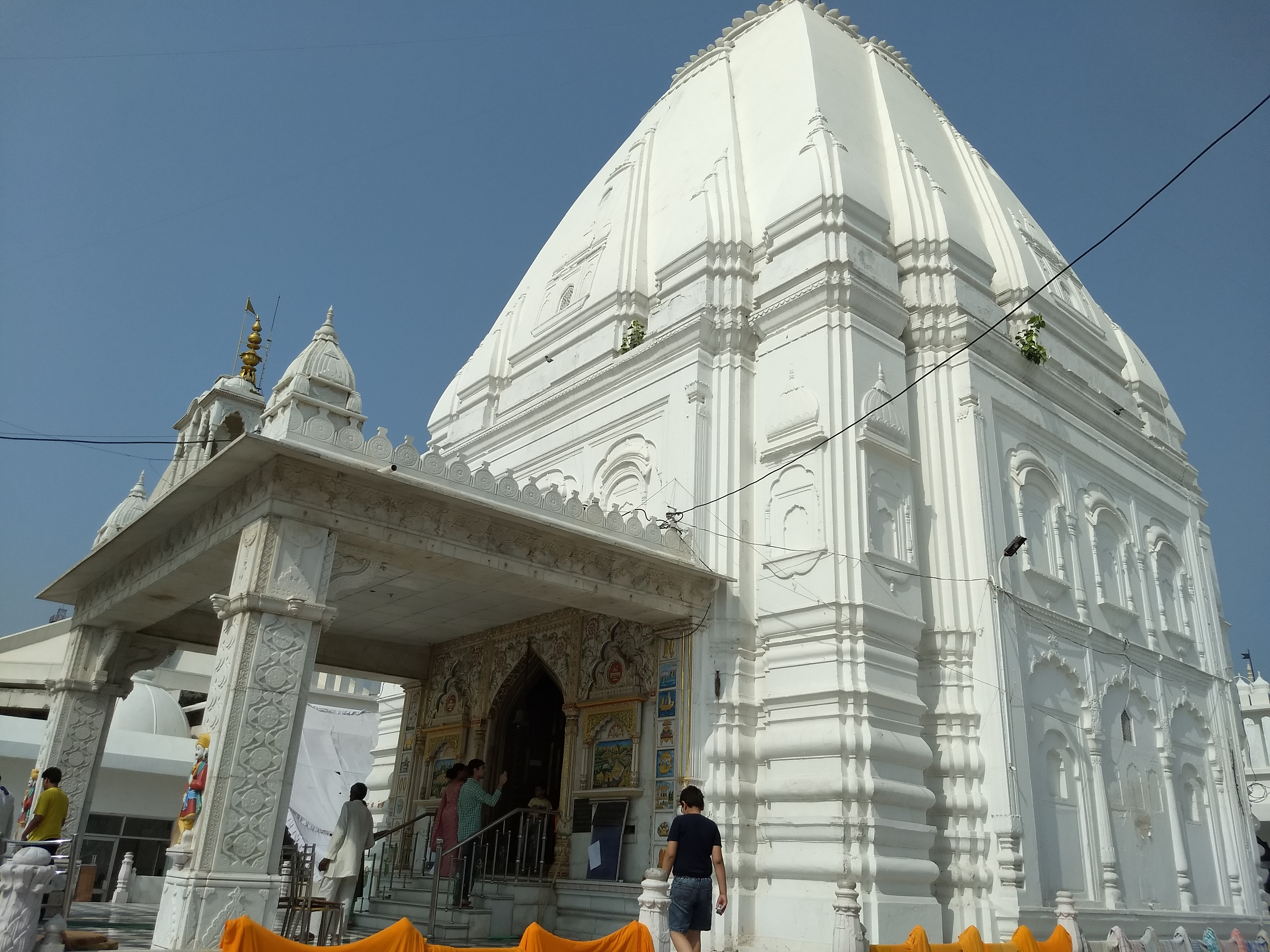
Central Shikhara of the Temple

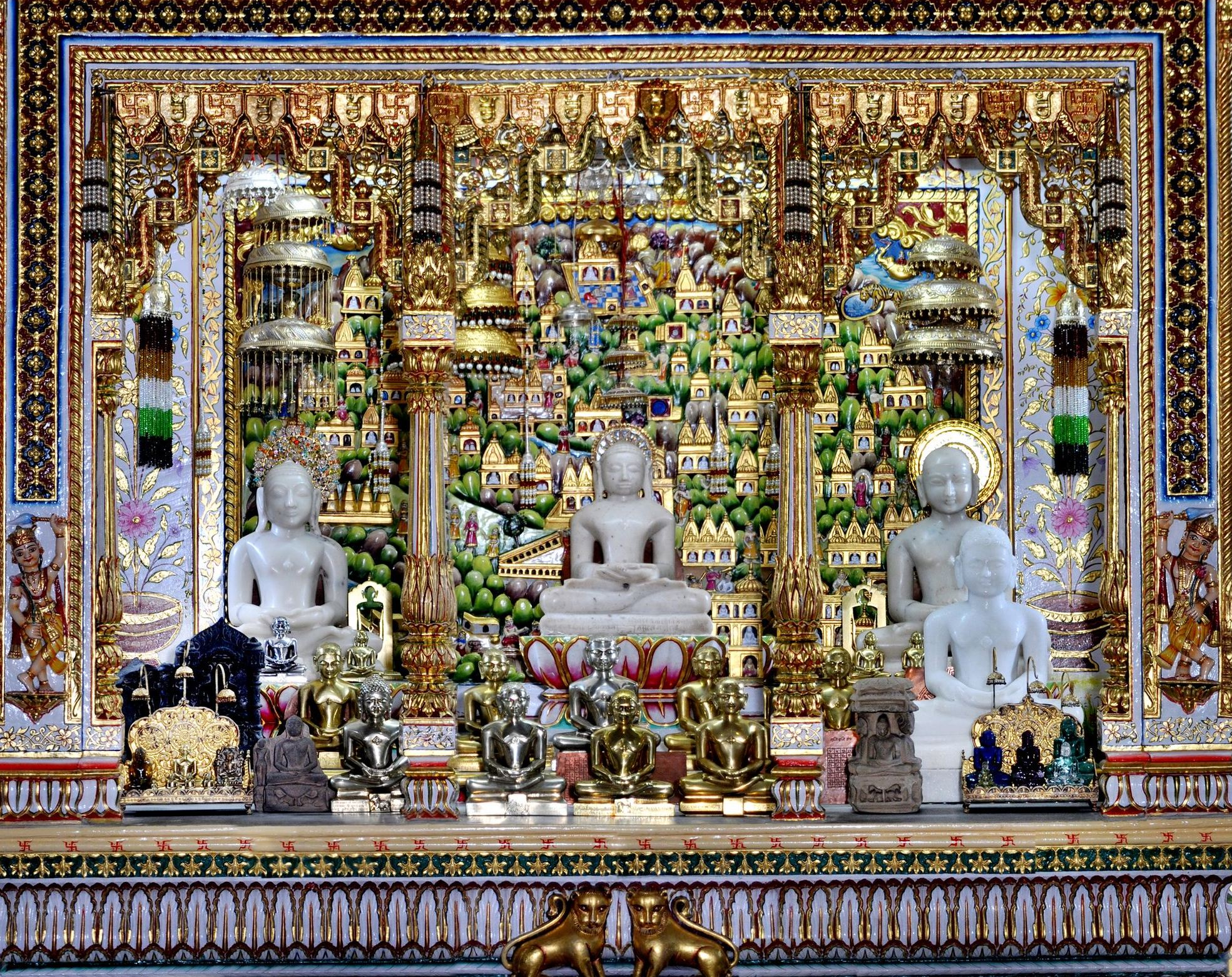
Shantinatha altar in Mulanayak Temple

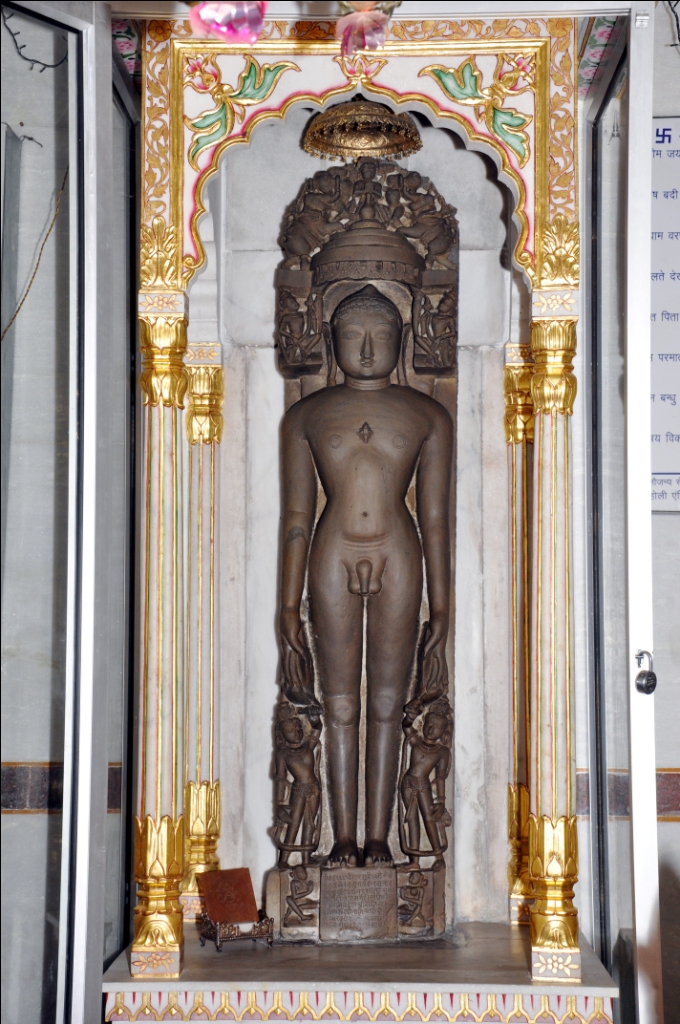
12th century Shantinath idol in Kayotsarga

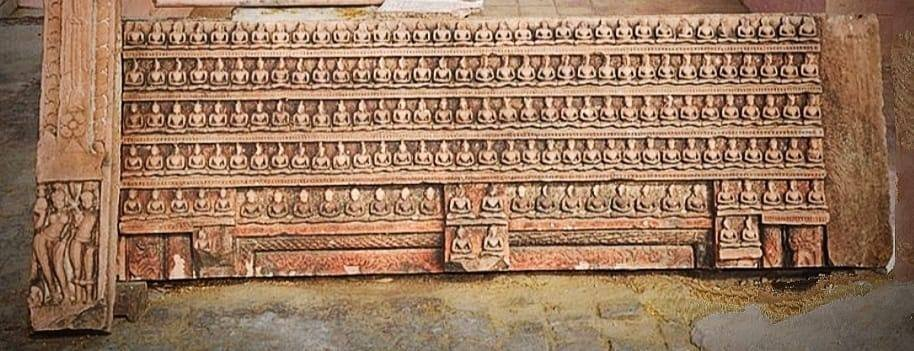
2nd century stone relief depicting 170 Tirthankara

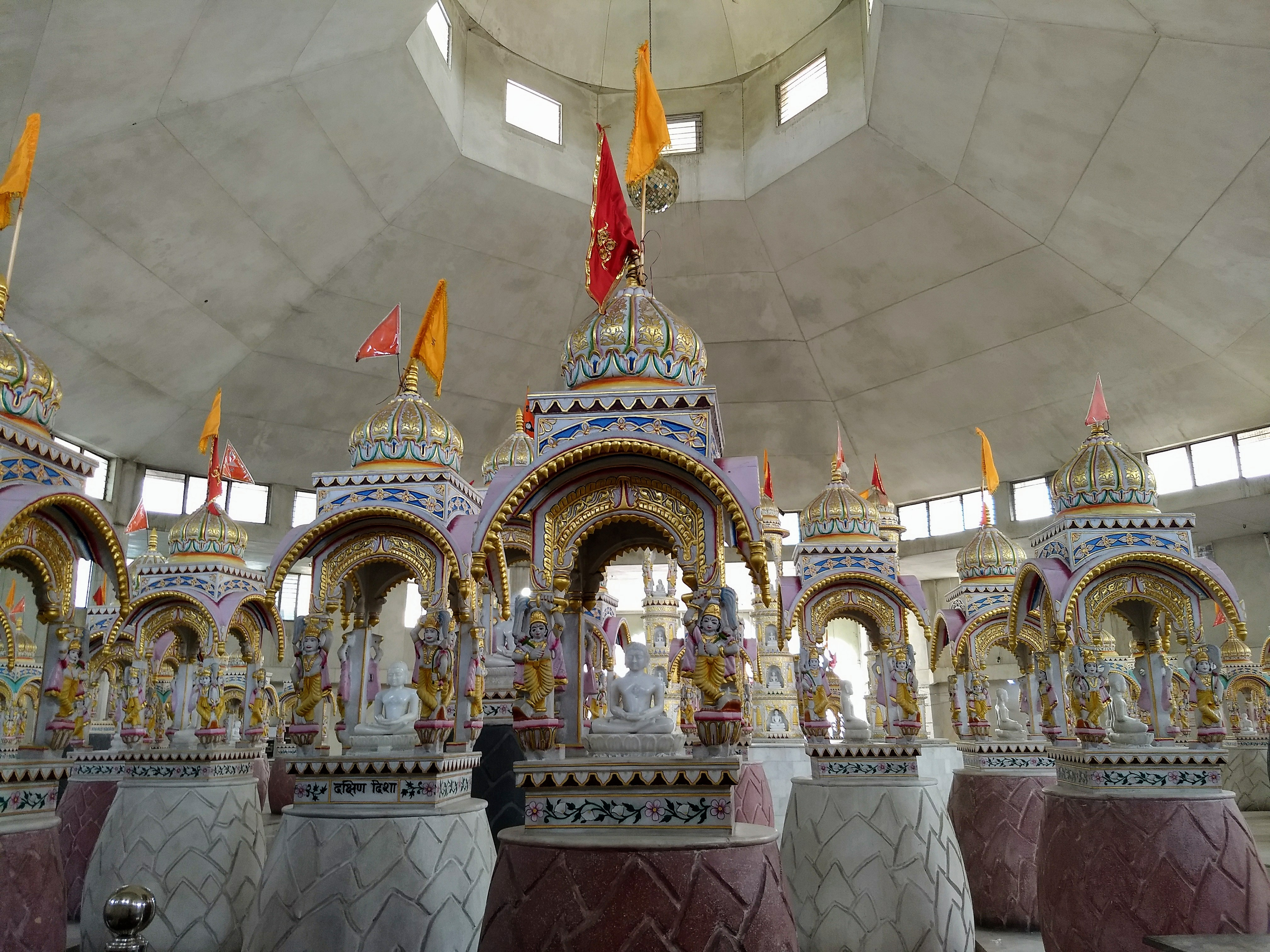
Nandishwardweep Jinayalya

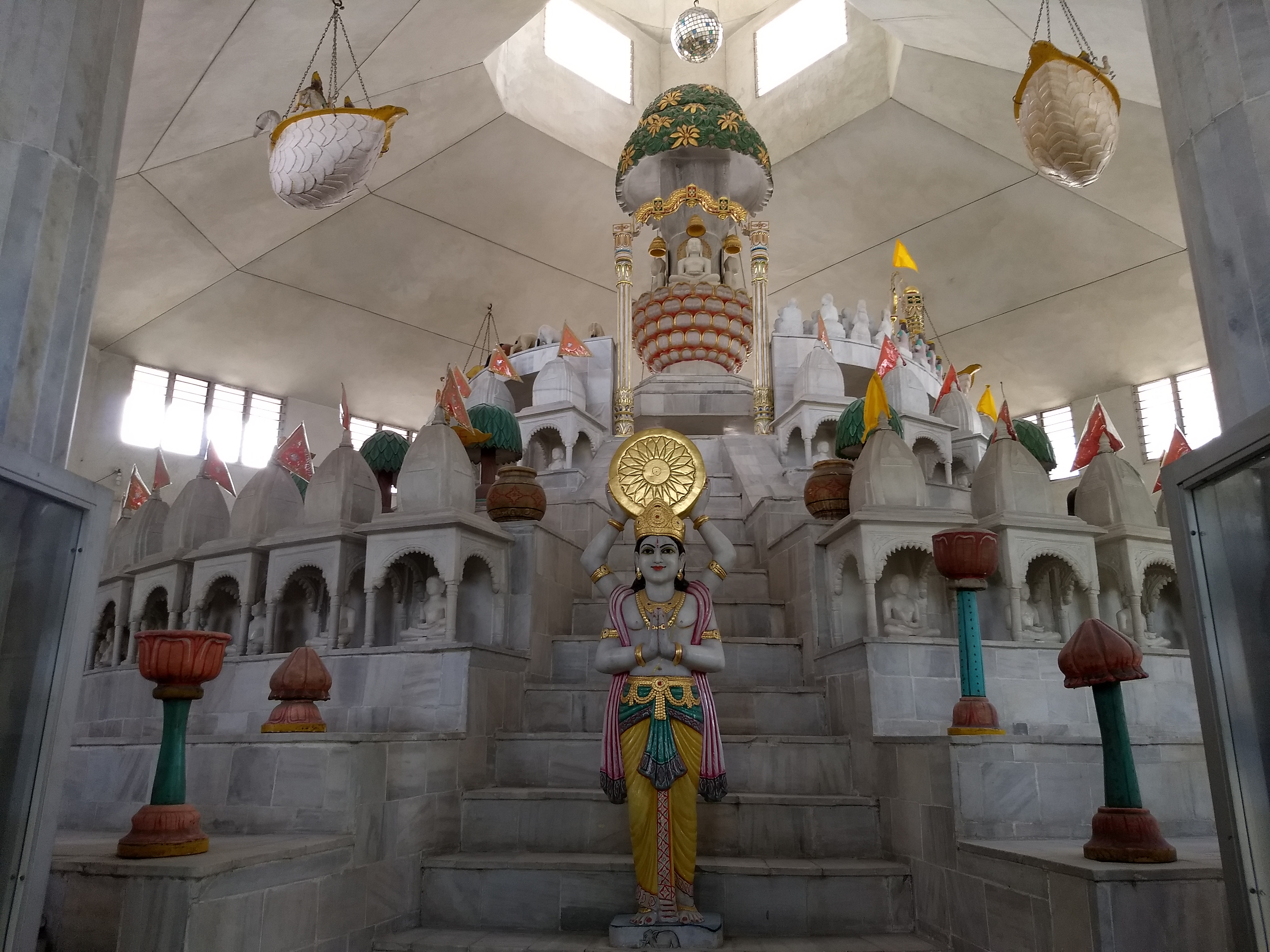
Shri Mallinatha Samavasarana

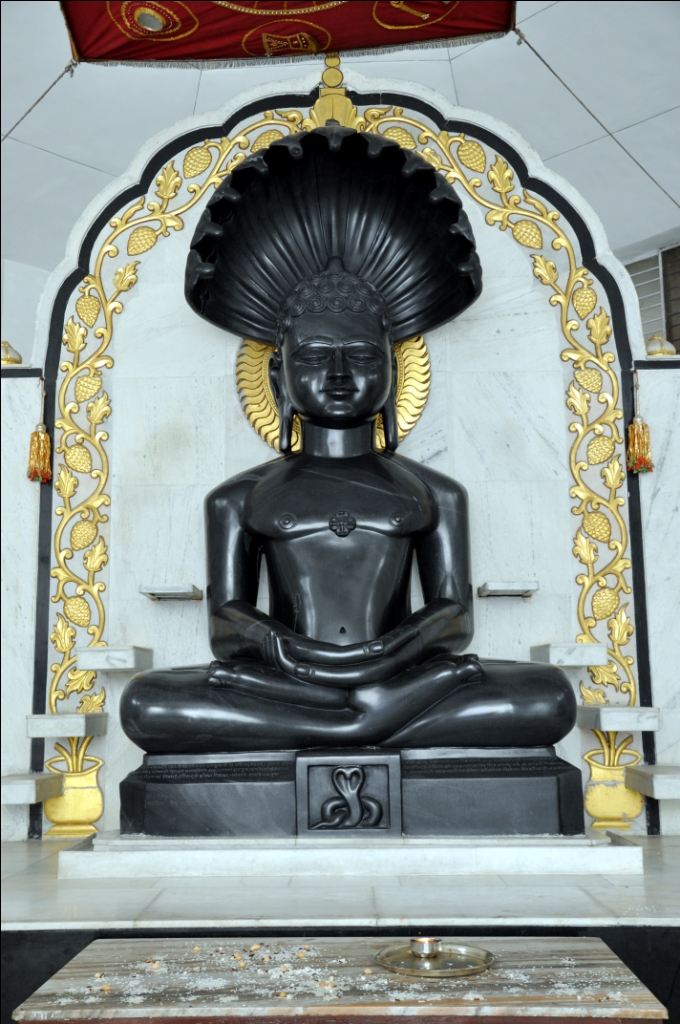
Shri Parshvanatha Mandir

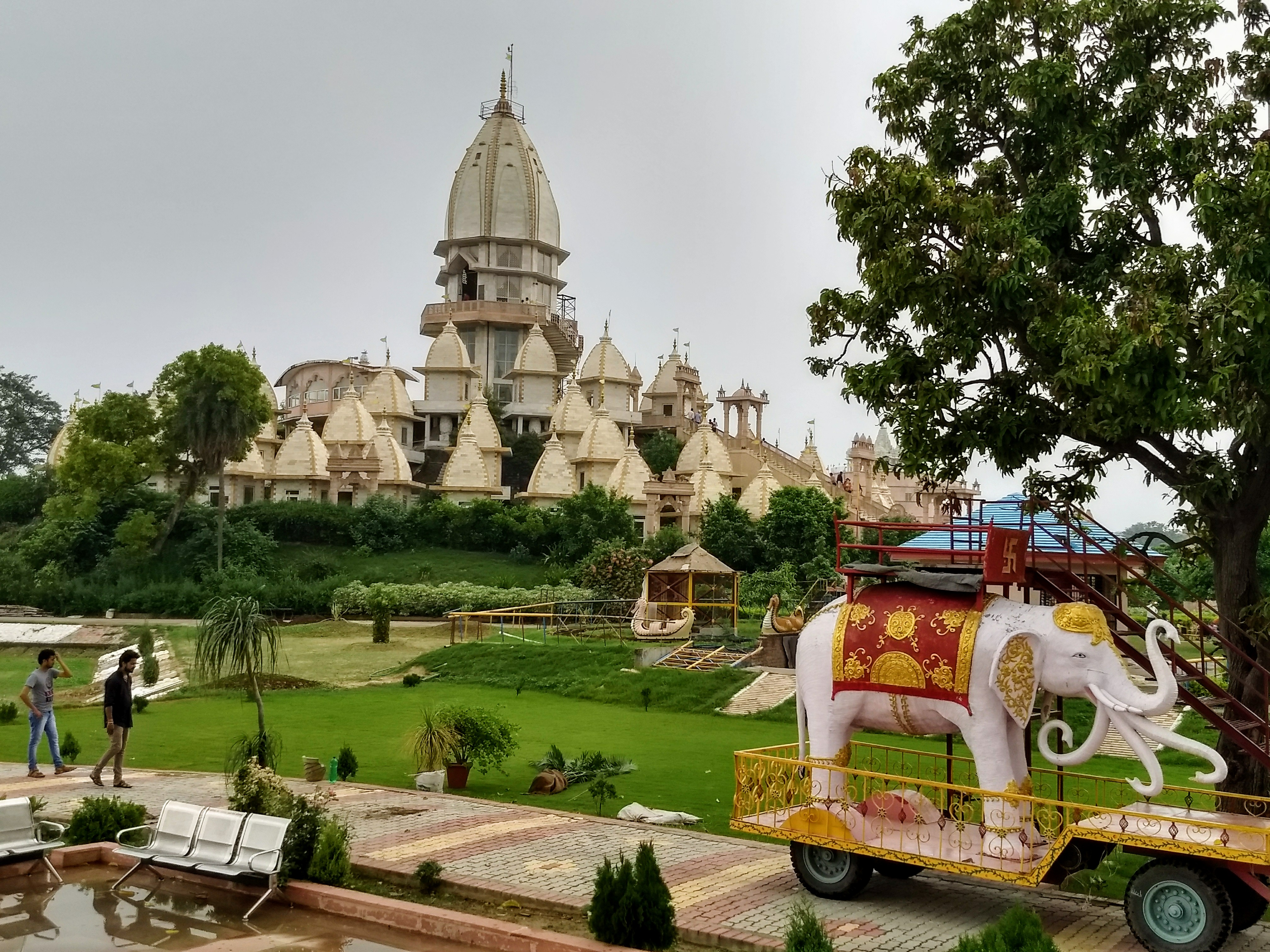
Kailash Parvat Rachna

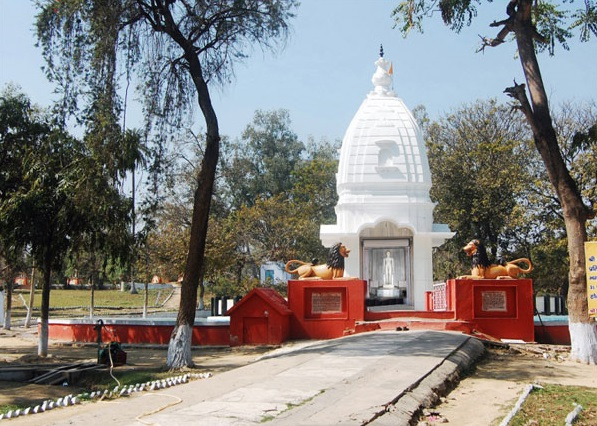
Shri Mahavir Jal Mandir

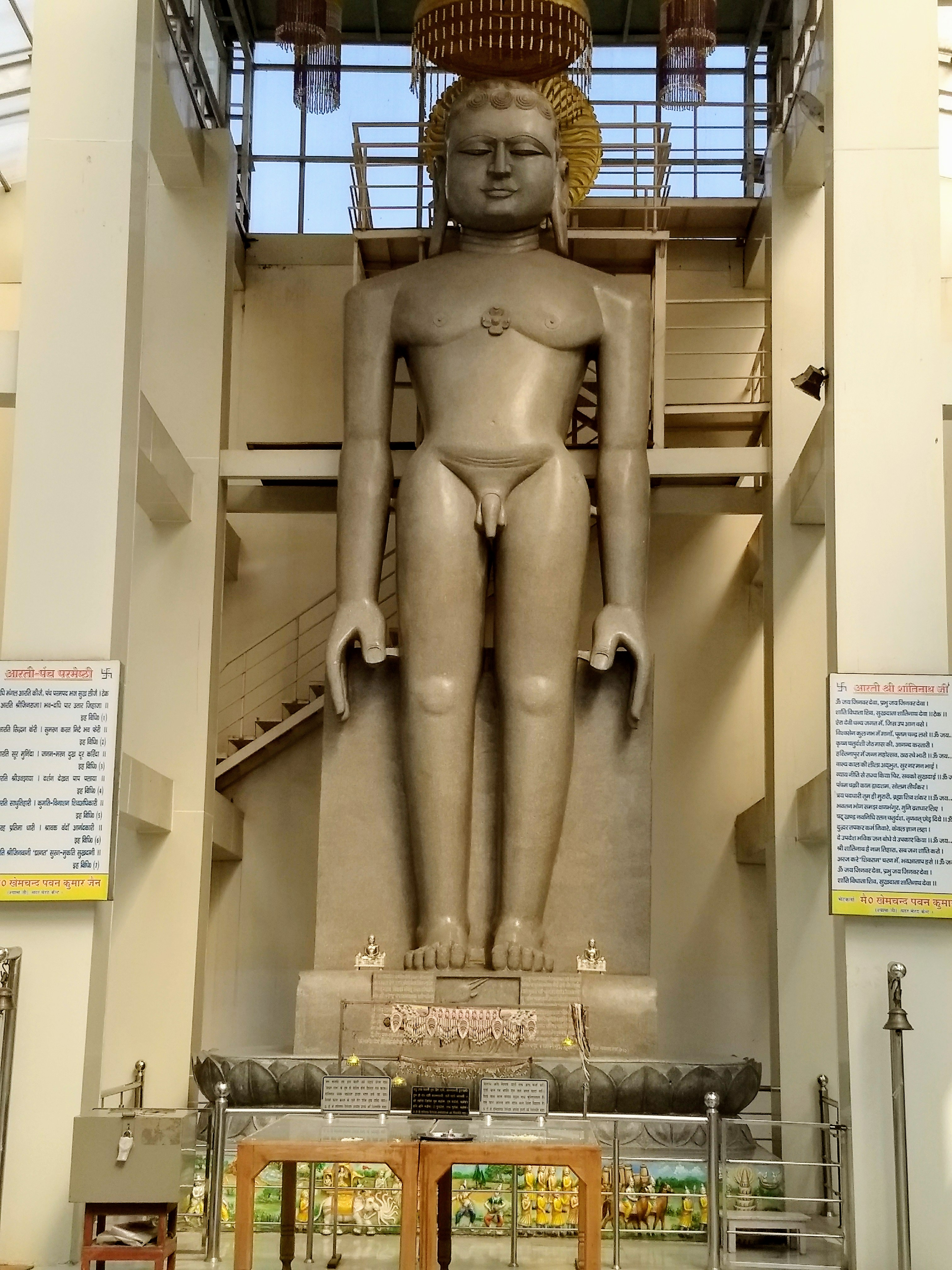
32 feet (9.8 m) idol of Shantinath

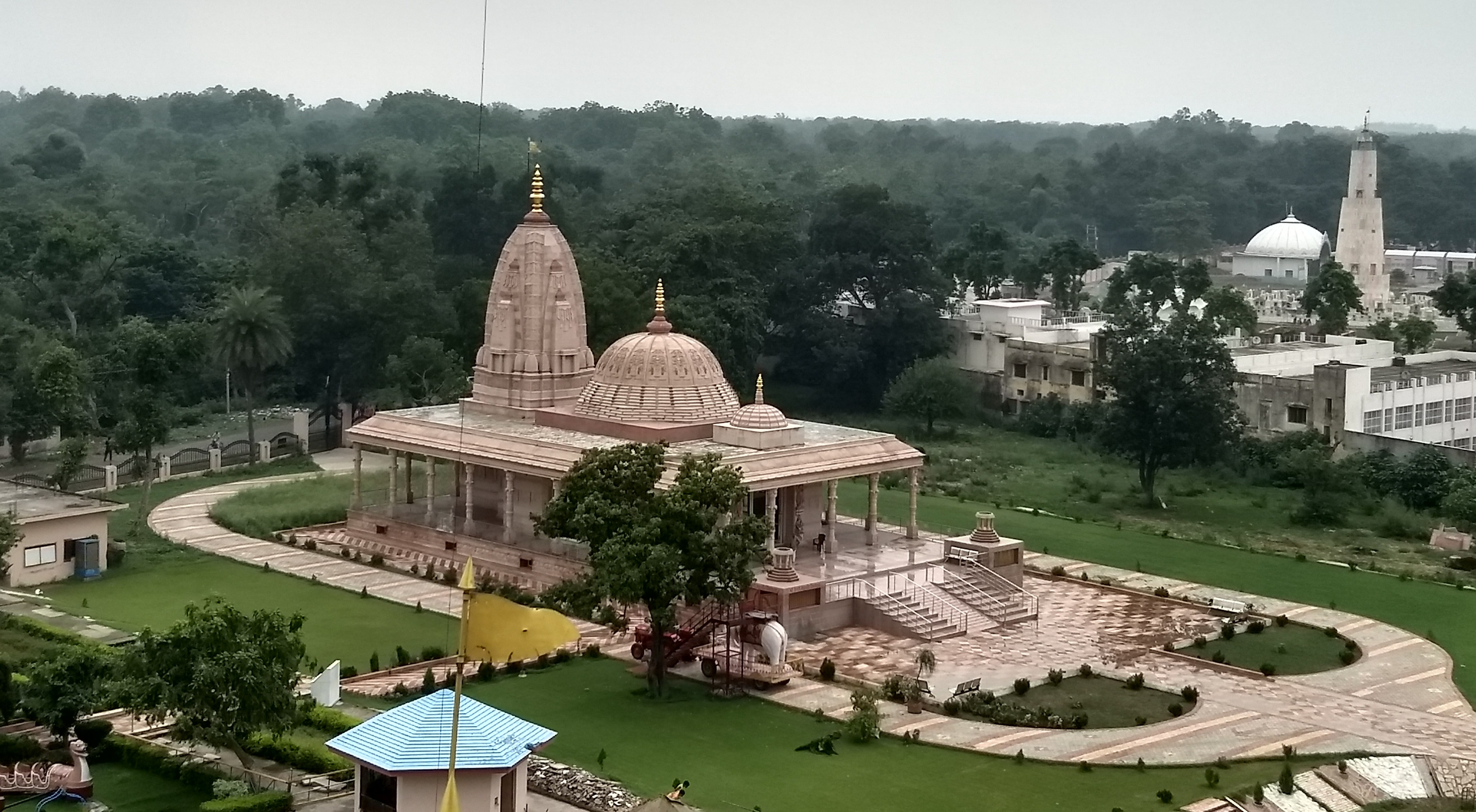
Bharata-Bahubali Mandir

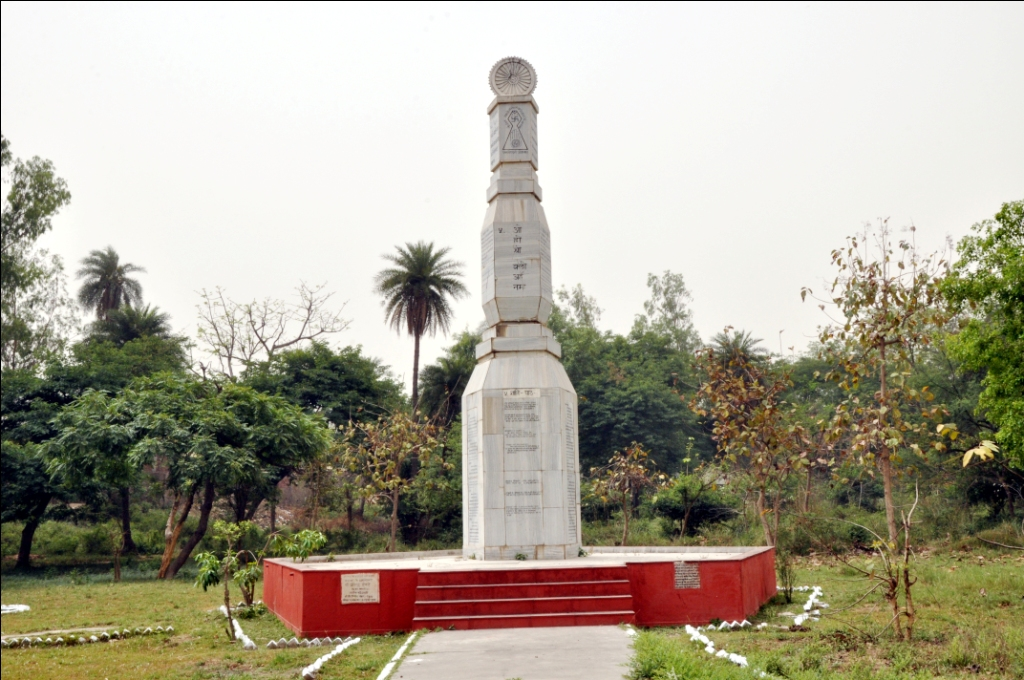
Jain Kirti Stambh

== Kailash Parvat Rachna ==
Kailash Parvat is a 131-feet high structure, built under the aegis of Shri Digambar Jain Teerth Kshetra Committee This temple is dedicated to the first tīrthaṅkara, Rishabhanatha. The Panch-kalyanak Pratishtha of Kailash Parvat was completed in April 2006. The Kailash Parvat complex comprises several Jain monuments including Moti-Dhanash Mandap, Yatri Niwas and Helipad.

== Nearby temples ==
=== Jambudweep Jain Teerth ===
Jambudweep was founded by Gyanmati in 1972 and the model of Jambudvipa was completed in 1985. Its campus has various Jain temples which includes Sumeru Parvat, Lotus Temple, Teen Murti Mandir, Meditation Temple, Badi Murti, Teen Lok Rachna and many other tourist attractions.

=== Shwetambar Jain Temples ===
Shantinath Shwetambar Temple was renovated in the mid 20th century and the consecration ceremony took place in Margashirsha of VS 2021. Jain Sthanak and Dada Vaadi of the Sthānakavāsī sect are also situated near to Shwetambar Temple.

=== Ashtapad Teerth ===
Ashtapad Teerth was built under the aegis of Shri Hastinapur Jain Shwetambar Teerth Trust. It is a 46-metre-high (151 ft) structure, notable for its intricate architecture and stone-carvings. Its Panch-kalyanak Pratishtha took place in December 2009 under the grace of Gachhadipati Acharya Nityanand Surishwerji. Ashtapad Teerth depicts the geography of Mount Ashtapad which according to Jain scriptures, is the site where the first Jain tirthankara, Rishabhadeva attained moksha (nirvana).

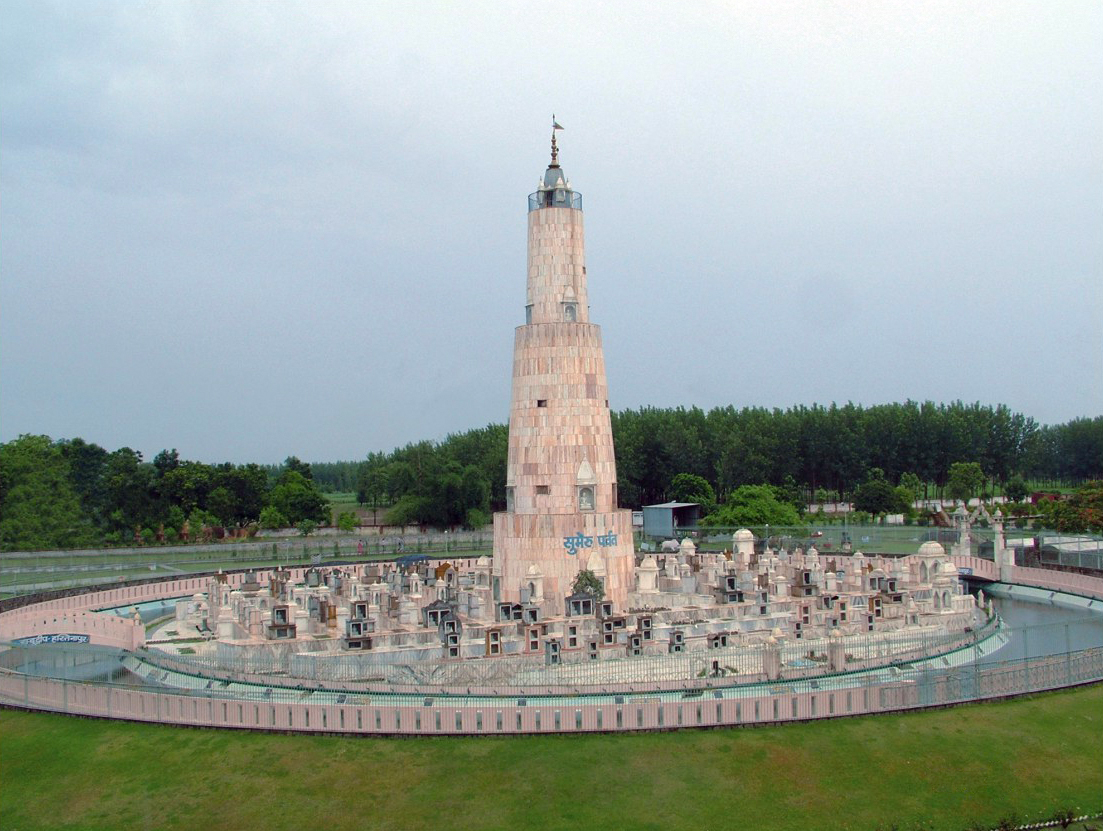
Jambudweep Rachna

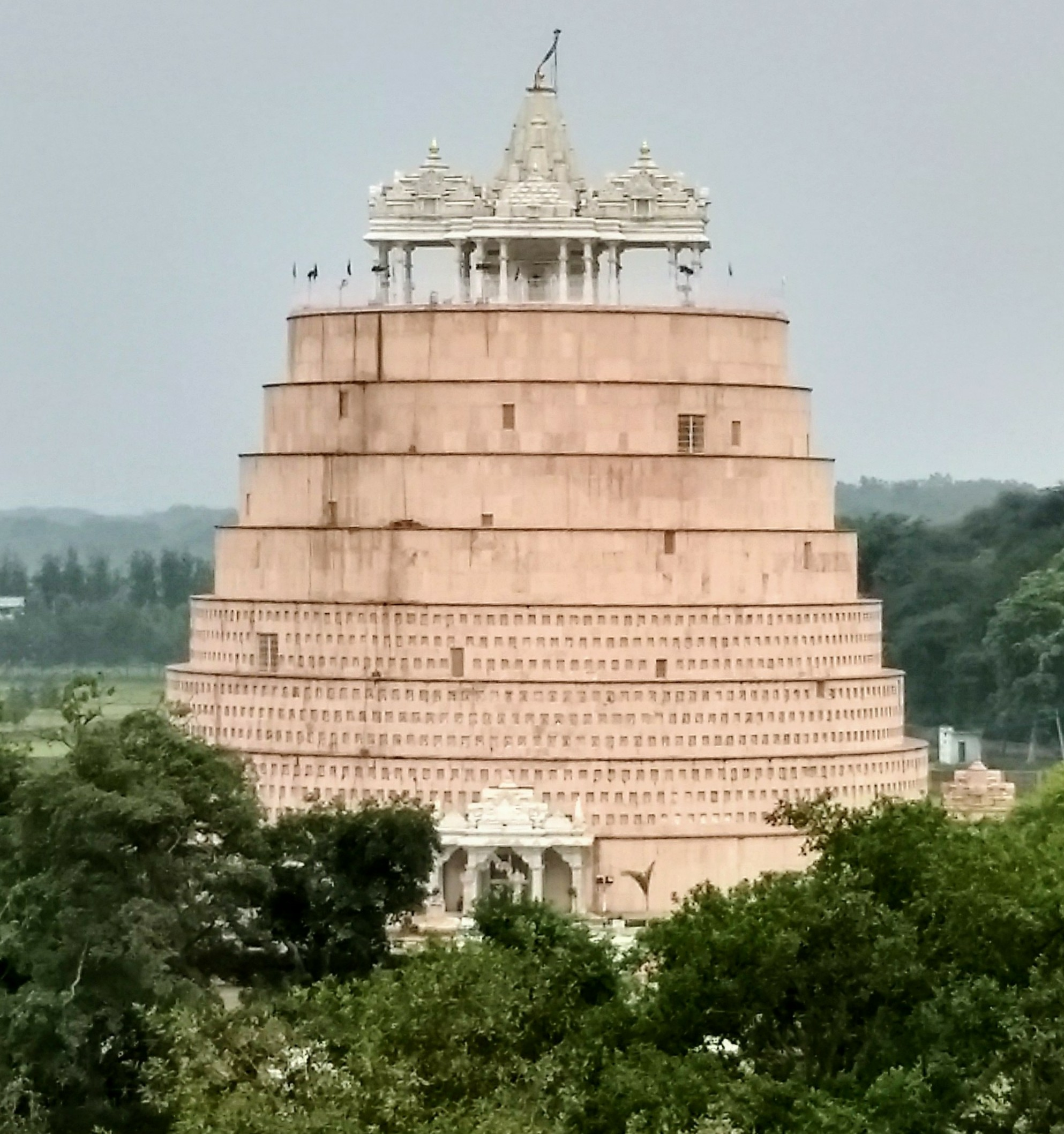
Ashtapad Teerth

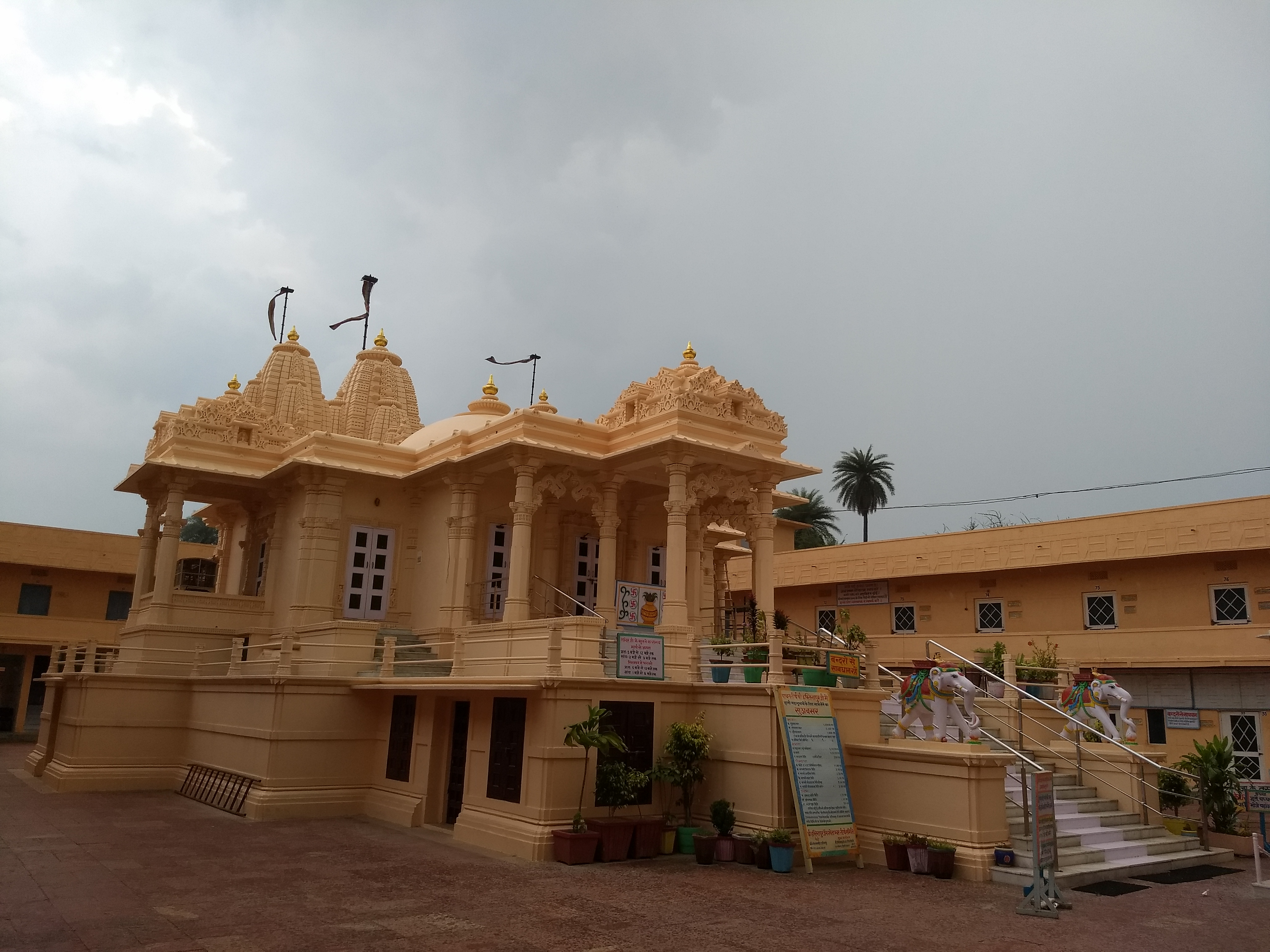
Shantinath Shwetambar Temple

== Important festivals ==
- Adinath Nirvana Mahotsava
- Akshaya Tritiya
- 48-day-long Bhaktamara Stotra
- Holi Fair
- 40-day-long Shanti Vidhan
- Shantinatha Kalyanakas Mahotsava
- Das Lakshana
- Kartik Fair

== See also ==
- Sri Digambar Jain Lal Mandir
- Naya Mandir
