= Jainism in Delhi =

Ancient centre of Jainism

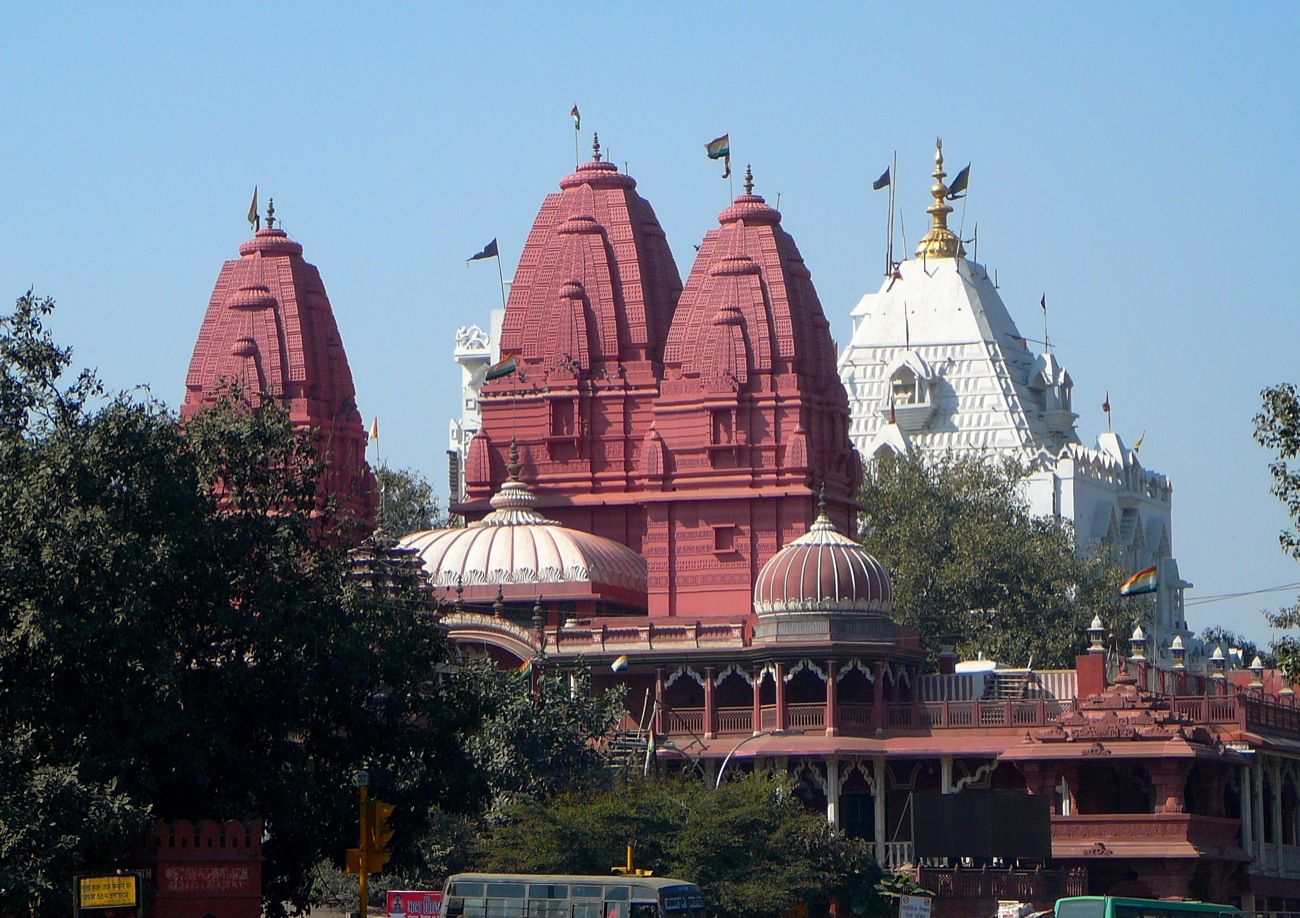
Sri Digambar Jain Lal Mandir in Chandni Chowk, Delhi.

Delhi is an ancient centre of Jainism, home to over 165 Jain temples. Delhi has a large population of Jains spread all over the city. It has had continued presence of a Jain community throughout its history, and it is still a major Jain centre.

== Rajput period ==
In Delhi, during the Tomara dynasty, the Jain poet Vibudh Shridhar wrote the Apabhramsa work Pasanah Chariu "The Conduct of Parshva" in VS 1189 with the support of a Jain merchant prince, Nattal Sahu. This book provides the very first account of the city of Delhi and the first mention of the Agrawal community. Agrawals continue to be the major business community in and around Delhi. Vibudh Shridhar is the first known Agrawal author. His Pasanah Chariu provides the first reference to the Agrawal community and the first historical reference to the legend of the origin of the name Dilli for Delhi.

Manidhari Jinchandra Suri visited Delhi (then often called Yoginipur) during the rule of the Tomara king Madanpal. He died in Samvat 1223. His samadhi is now known as the Mehrauli Dada Bari.

== Khalji period ==
Alauddin Khalji recruited Thakkar Pheru a Shrimal Jain from Kannana in Haryana as a treasurer. He was an expert in coins, metals, and gems. For the benefit of his son Hemapal, he wrote several books on related subjects including Dravya Prariksha on metals and various coins; and Ratna Pariksha on various precious gems stones. He was continuously employed until the rule of Ghiasuddin Tughluq.

== Tughlaq period ==
Delhi was the location where the Digambara Bhattaraka institution was initiated according to some authors. Bhaṭṭāraka Prabhachandra, who was the disciple of Bhaṭṭāraka Ratnakirti of Ajmer, visited Delhi at the invitation of the lay Jains there. He visited the Muslim ruler Firuz Shah Tughluq, who had a Jain minister named Chand Shah. At Ferozshah's request, he visited his inner courtyard. Until that time, Prabhachandra used to be without clothes, but at Chand Sah's request, he wore a loincloth. Bakhtavar Shah in his Buddhi Prakash writes:

=== Jinaprabh Suri and Vividha Tirtha Kalpa ===
Jinaprabh Suri, who had wandered over a large part of India and written an account of various tirthas during Samvat 1364–1389, lived in Delhi during the rule of b. Tughluq and wrote parts of the Vividha Tirtha Kalpa there. A Jain idol originally at Hansi which was in the royal storage, was released with his efforts. It is now said to be located at the Jain temple at Chelpuri in Delhi.

== Mughal period ==
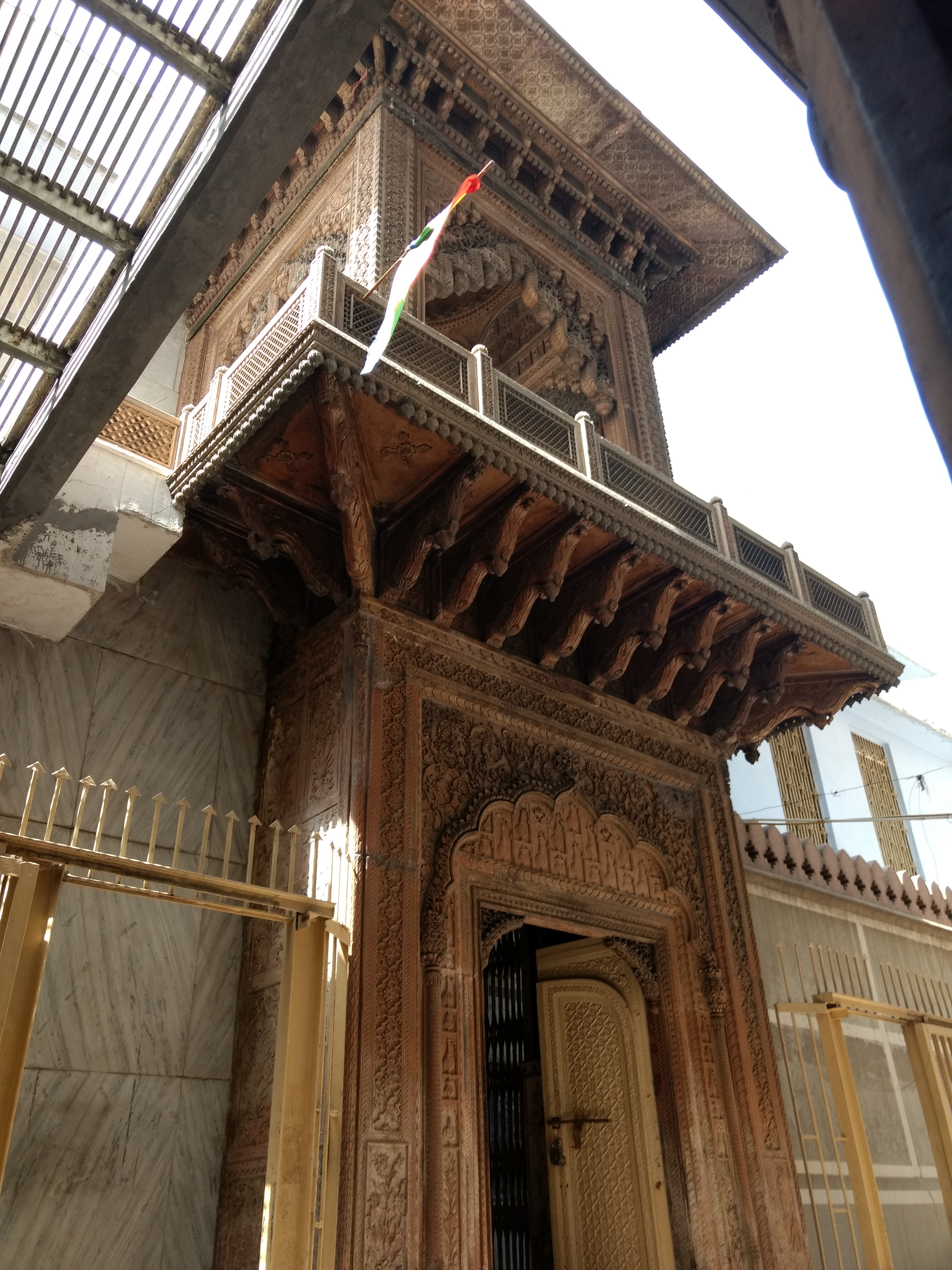
Naya Mandir

Both Akbar and Jahangir, who had their capital at Agra, invited and met Jain monks. Shahjahan moved his capital to Delhi after building the walled city of Delhi called Shahjahanabad.

Several Jain, such as Sahu Todar served as the imperial treasurers during the Mughal rule.

A part of Shahjahanabad was allocated to the Jains on the south side of the Chandni Chowk canal, close to the imperial residence (qila-mubarak, now known as the Red Fort). The Jains were permitted to have a temple during 1658 in Urdu Bazar, which was called the Urdu Mandir (now Lal Mandir), provided it did not look like a temple.

Raja Harsukh Rai in the early 19th century was the chief of the Agrawal Jain community, and a builder of several Jain temples in and around Delhi including the Naya Mandir, was the imperial treasurer during Sam. 1852-Sam. 1880. Naya Mandir was the first Delhi temple to have a shikhara.

== Modern period ==
Delhi has 148 Digambara temples, mostly in the walled city areas, 61 Sthanakvasi Upashrayas and 16 Śvetāmbara Murtipujaka temples. In modern Delhi, the majority of Jains in Jain Colony (Veer Nagar), nearby Roopnagar area are Bhabra refugees from Punjab in Pakistan who arrived after the partition of India.

== Main temples ==
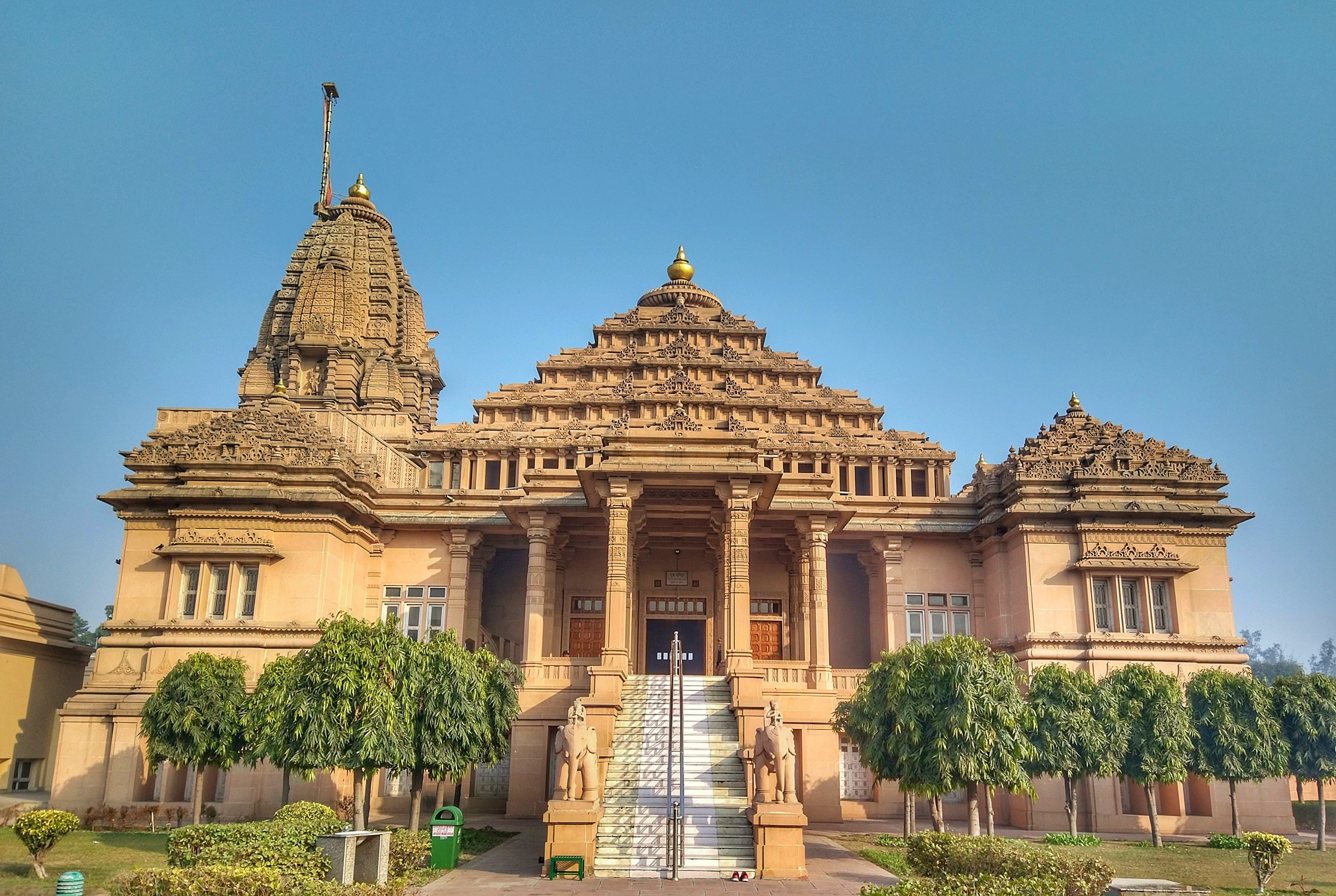
Atma Vallabha Sanskriti mandir

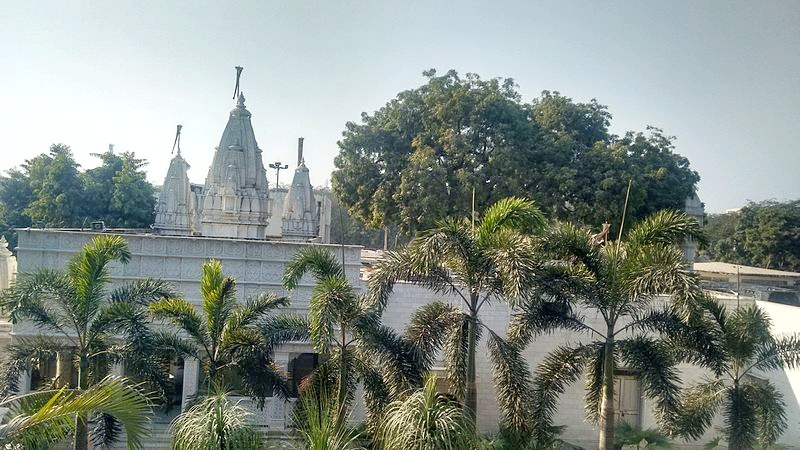
Dādābadī, Mehrauli

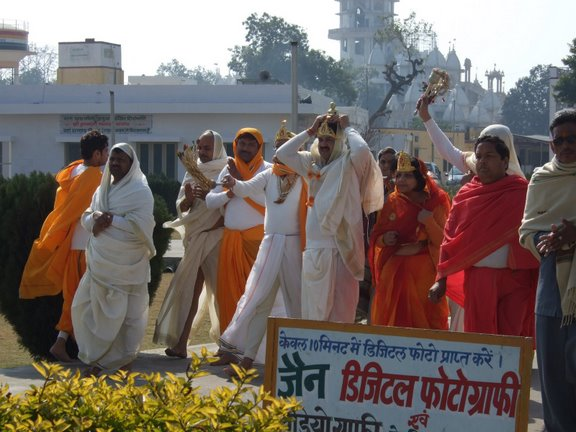
Worship in Jambudweep

Digambara Jain Lal Mandir

The oldest Jain temple in Delhi known as Lal Mandir ("Red Temple"). It is just opposite of the Red Fort on the Netaji Subhas Marg, Chandni Chowk, Delhi. Constructed in 1658, the temple has undergone many modifications, additions, and alterations. The temple has a free bird hospital (though donations are appreciated) in the courtyard. It practices the Jain principle that all life is sacred.

Shri Atma Vallabh Jain Smarak

Located at 20th kilometer on G. T. Karnal Road, its idyllic setting bring out the elegance of the buildings, which were all built according to traditional Jain Shastras. The complex includes Shri Vasupujaya Temple, Shri Vallabh Smarak, a Shastra Bhandar, a Jain Museum, and a Research Centre for Indology. The complex also has a school for children, a Dharamshala & Bhojanalaya for the convenience of visitors, as well as a free dispensary. The complex also contains "Devi Padamavati Temple" and a shrine of Sadhvi Mrigavati ji.

Naya Mandir

This was the first temple in Delhi with a shikhar. Raja Harsukh Rai, imperial treasurer in the late Mughal period, constructed this large and ornate Jain temple in the Dharampura locality of Old Delhi in 1807 during the rule of Mughal Emperor Akbar II with a cost of about 8 Lakh rupees, then an enormous amount. He was able to obtain the royal permission to construct a shikhara for the temple for the first time during the Mughal rule. This temple is known as the Naya Mandir (new temple), since an older Jain temple, now known as the Lal Mandir already existed.

Ahinsa Sthal

Ahinsa Sthal is a Jain temple located in Mehrauli, Delhi. A magnificent monolithic 4.93 metres (16.2 ft) statue of Tirthankara Mahāvīra in lotus position weighing around 30 tonnes is installed here. The temple complex also consist of a large garden.

Dādābadī, Mehrauli

The dādābadī in Delhi, is the place where Dādā Guru Jinachandra Sūri was cremated. According to the legend, while on his deathbed, he told his followers that when he died the "Mani" (magic jewel) embedded in his forehead would fall out and should be placed in a bowl of milk. He also instructed them that his body should not be kept anywhere while preparing for the funeral. Everyone was so sad, however, that they forgot his instructions and set his body on the ground. When they tried to move it again, it wouldn't budge. Even elephants were used, but all attempts failed and the last rites had to be performed right there, at the spot where the shrine now stands.

=== Nearby Jain Tirthas ===
- Hastinapur
- Tijara
- Ahi Kshetra
- Hansi
- Ranila
- Kasan

== Other Temples ==
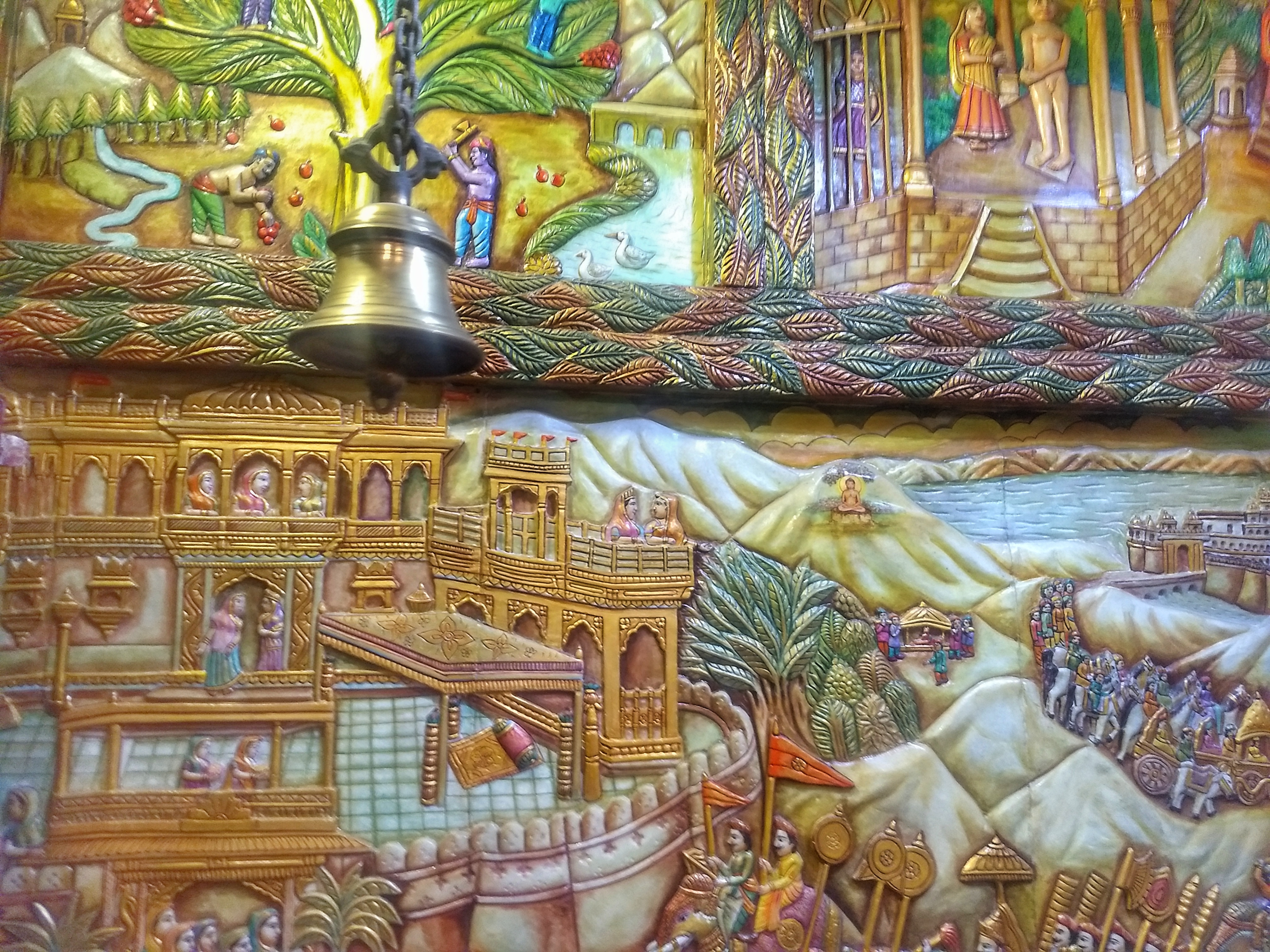
Interior in Shri Padmavati Purwal Digamber Jain Mandir

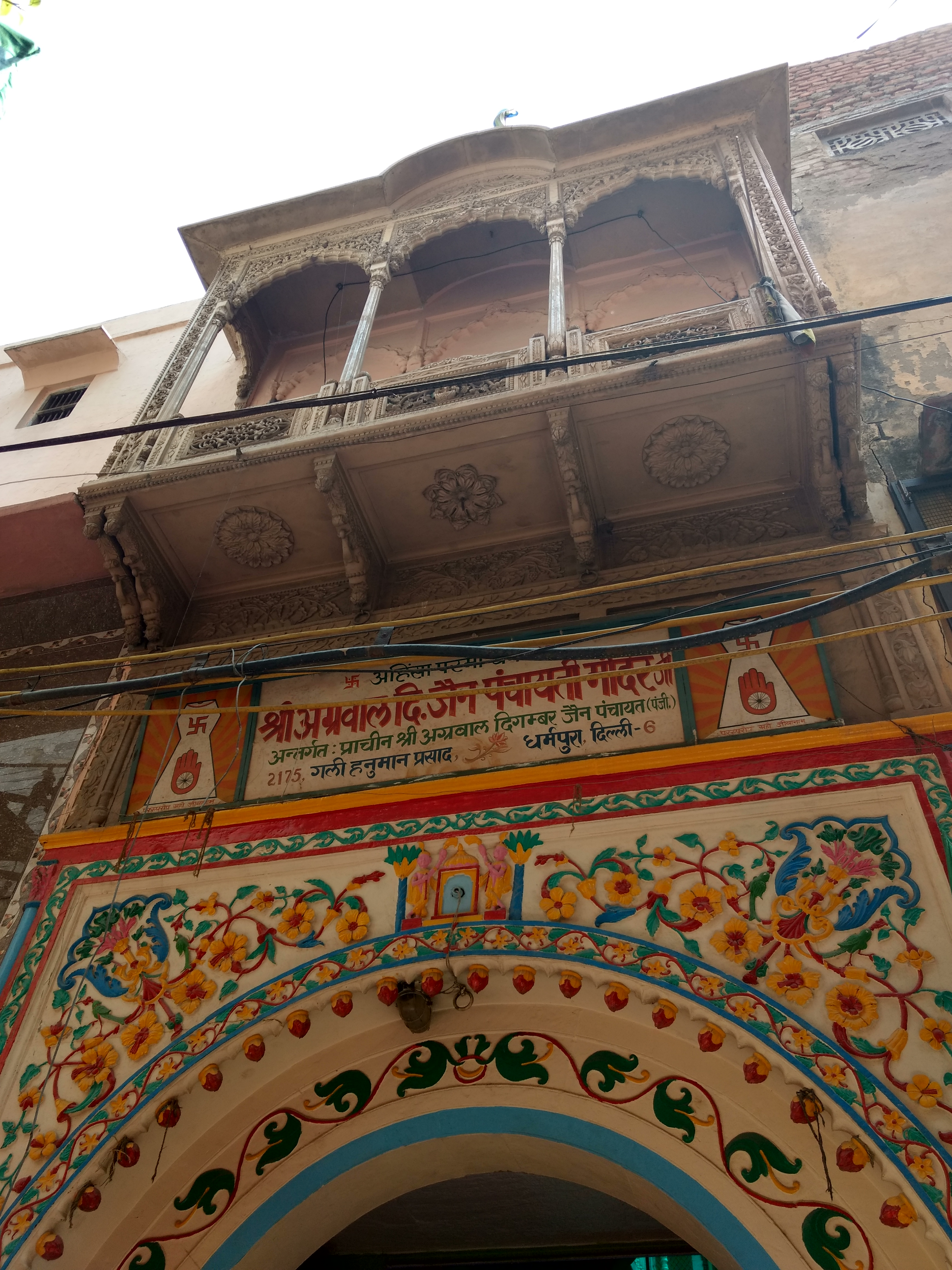
Shri Digamber Jain Panchayti Mandir

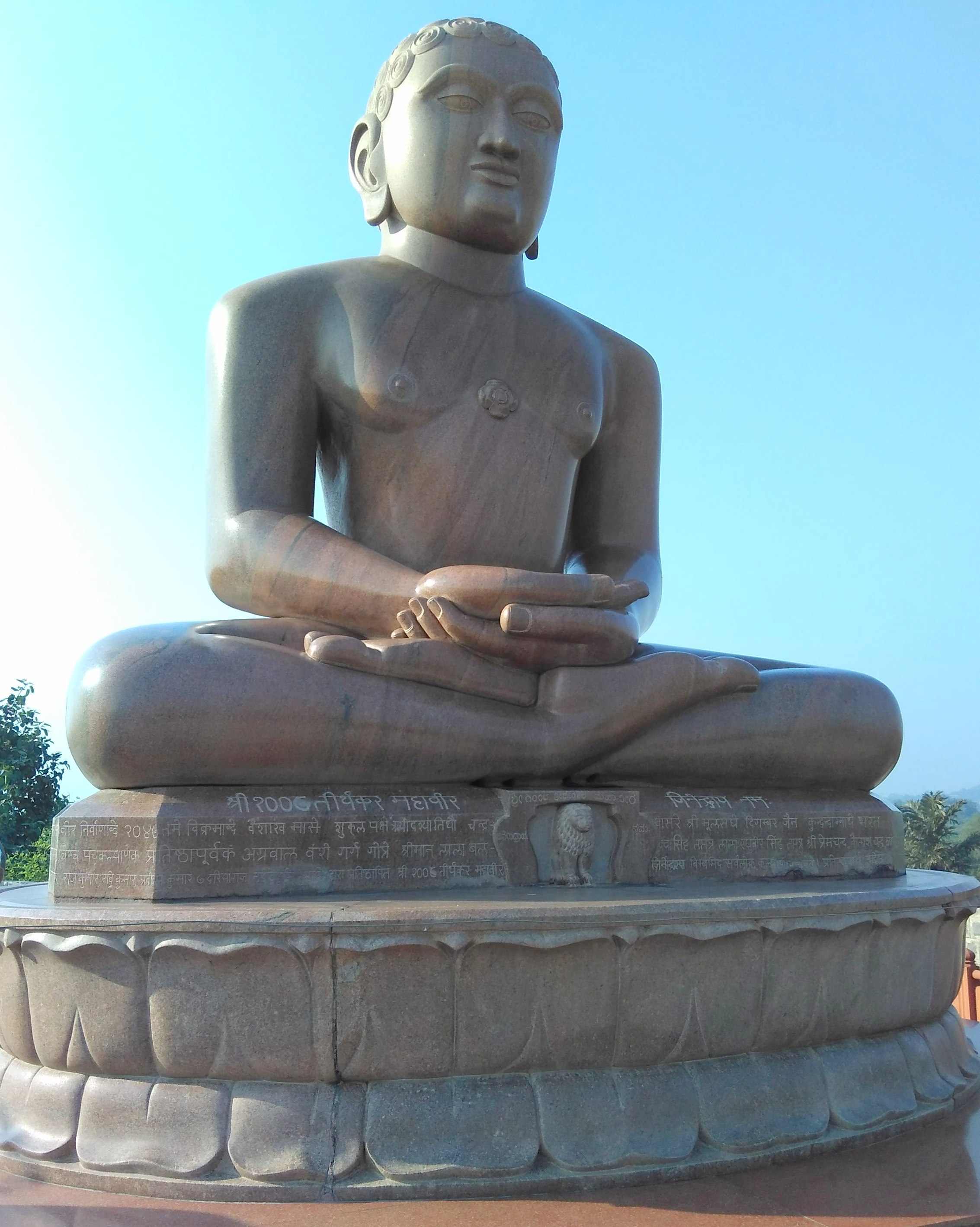
Statue of Mahavira at Ahinsa Sthal

Central Delhi

== See also ==
- Bhattaraka
- Mula Sangh
- Agrawal Jain
