= Sri Digambar Jain Lal Mandir =

Jain temple in India

- Śrī Digambar Jain Lāl Mandir
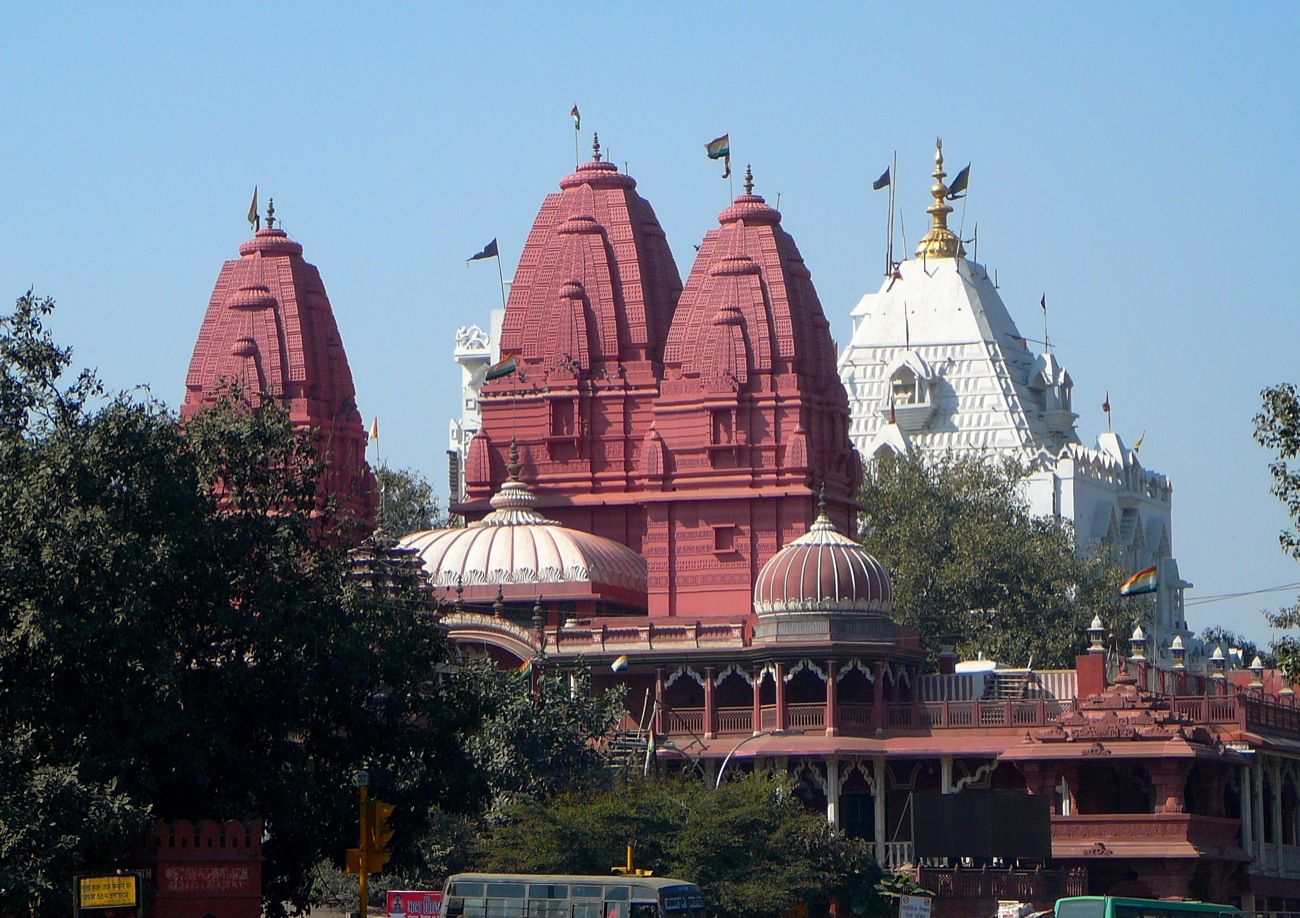
- Digambar Jain Lal Mandir, Chandni Chowk, Delhi.

- Lal Mandir

Religion
- Affiliation: Jainism
- Deity: Parshvanatha
- Festivals: Mahavir Jayanti, Vidhaan

Location
- Location: Chandni Chowk, Old Delhi
- Coordinates: 28°39′20.8″N 77°14′10.6″E

Architecture
- Established: 1656
- Temple: 1

Sri Digambar Jain Lal Mandir (Śrī Digambar Jain Lāl Mandir) is the oldest and best-known Jain temple in Old Delhi, India. It is directly across from the Red Fort in the historical Chandni Chowk area.

The temple is known for an avian veterinary hospital, called the Jain Birds Hospital, in a second building behind the main temple.

Located just opposite the massive Red Fort at the intersection of Netaji Subhas Marg and Chandni Chowk, Digambar Jain Temple is the oldest Jain temple in the capital. According to Jain scholar Balbhadra Jain's compendium of Digambar Jain shrines in India, it was built in 1656.

== History ==
=== Foundation and Mughal Relations (1656) ===
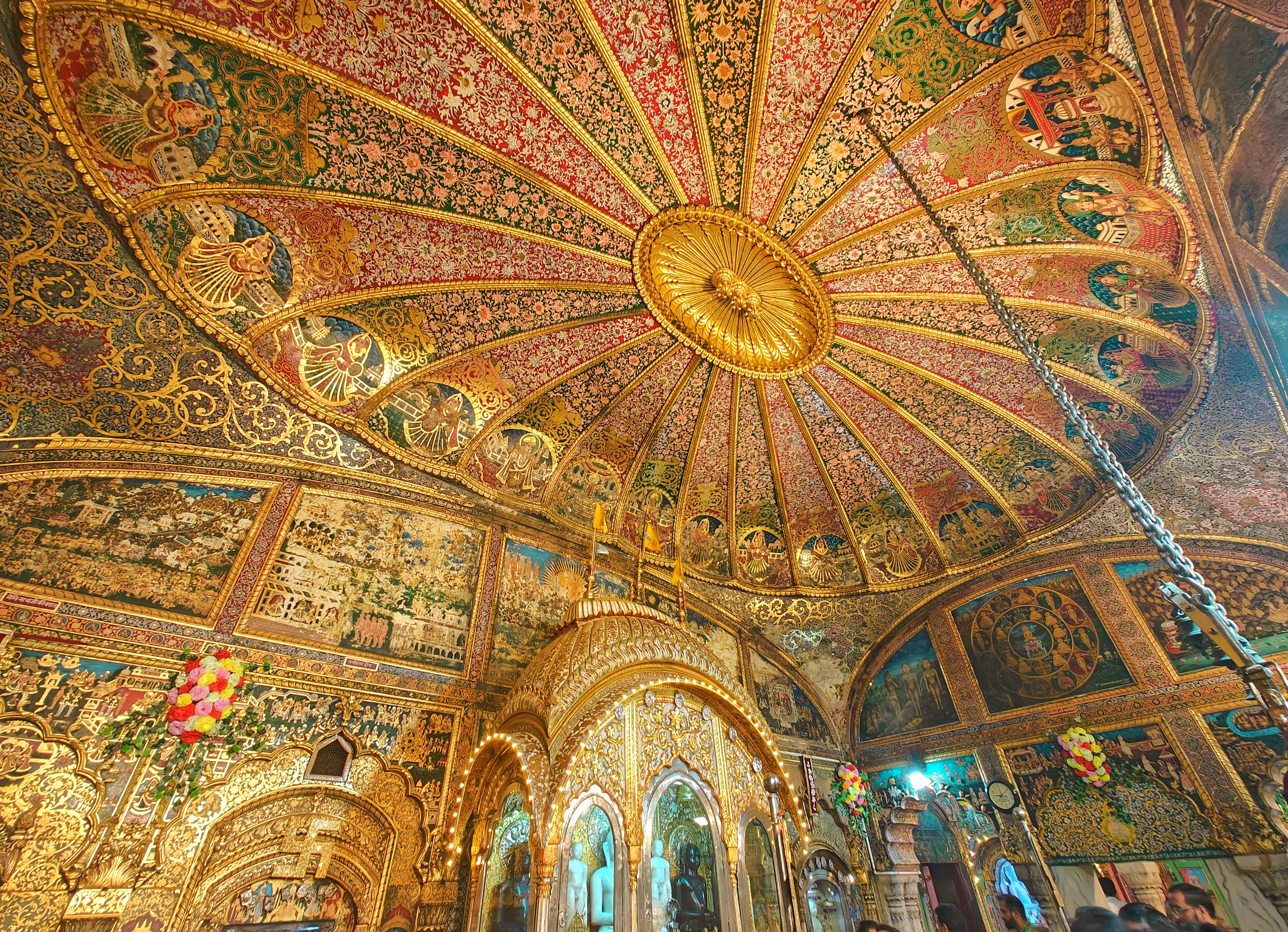
Interior

Old Delhi was founded by Mughal Emperor Shah Jahan (1628–1658) who built what is commonly known as the old city or walled city, surrounded by a wall, with the main street Chandni Chowk in front of the Red Fort, the imperial residence. Shah Jahan invited several Agrawal Jain landlords to come and settle in the city and granted them some land south of the Chandani Chowk around Dariba Gali.

According to Jain scholar Balbhadra Jain's compendium of Digambar Jain shrines in India, the temple was constructed during the reign of the Mughal emperor Shah Jahan. Balbhadra Jain states that a Jain officer of the Mughal army is said to have kept a tirthankara statue in his tent for personal worship. The tent gradually started attracting other Jain army officers, and subsequently, a Jain temple was constructed at the site in 1656. At that time, the temple was also known as "Urdu temple" (because it was located in an area called "Urdu Bazaar") and "Lashkari Mandir" (laskhar means an army camp). Balbhadra Jain also mentions that there are several legends about the temple. One such legend claims that Shah Jahan's successor Aurangzeb once ordered a ban on all musical instruments in the temple. However, miraculously, sounds of drums (nagadas) would be heard emanating from the temple despite inspections from the Mughal officers. Aurganzeb himself visited the temple to see the miracle, and finally, lifted the ban.

=== Post-Mughal Rebuilding (1878) ===
The present-day temple buildings were constructed after the fall of the Mughal Empire, and date from 1878.

Balbhadra Jain states that one of the idols in the temple dates back to 1491, and was originally installed by Bhattaraka Jinachandra. The Agrawal Jain community acquired three marble idols installed by Jivaraj Papriwal under the supervision of Bhattaraka Jinachandra in Samvat 1548 (1491 AD) for the temple. The main icon is that of Tirthankara Parshva. The deities in temple were originally kept in a tent belonging to an Agrawal Jain officer of the Mughal army.

Other nearby temples include the Gauri Shankar temple and the Naya Mandir. The Gauri Shankar temple was built next to the Lal Mandir in 1761 by Appa Gangadhara, a Maratha Brahman in the service of the Scindia when Delhi was under their influence. In 1800-1807, Raja Harsukh Rai, the imperial treasurer obtained imperial permission to build a temple with a shikhara in the Agrawal Jain neighborhood of Dharamapura, just south of Chandni Chowk. Thus temple, known for fine carvings, is now known as the Naya Mandir "New Temple".

== Architecture and Main Temple ==
=== Architectural Style ===
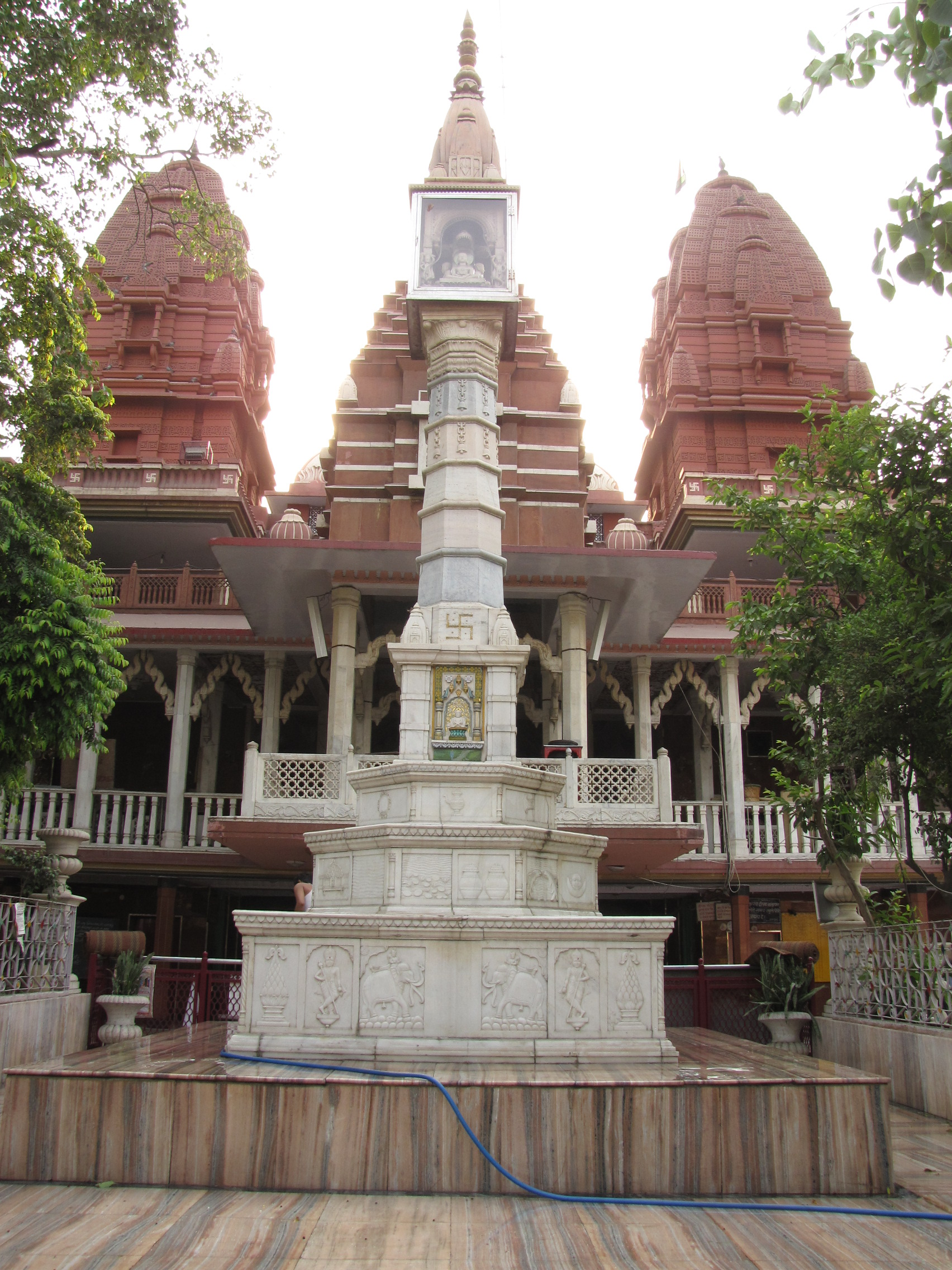
Manasthamba in front of the temple

A manastambha column stands in front of the temple. The main devotional area of the temple features three red sandstone spires. It is located on the first floor and reached by ascending to the terrace after crossing the small courtyard of the temple, surrounded by a colonnade.

=== Main Shrines and Idols ===
There are a number of shrines in this area but the main shrine is of Lord Mahavira, the 24th and last Tirthankara of the present Avasarpani era (half time cycle of decreasing happiness as per Jain cosmology). Born in 599 BC in the ancient republic of Vaishali (Bihar) as a prince, he renounced all worldly pleasures and comforts and went in search of 'Moksha' (salvation). Soon he attained Kevala Jnana (Enlightenment), and spent the rest of his life preaching to the people all over the country about the eternal truth of life and ways to attain Moksha. Though some believe that he was the founder of Jainism but he was in a real sense the reformer of an existing faith who reorganized and presented the tenets of the religion in a form suitable to the period.

The statue of Rishabhanatha, the first Tirthankara is also present here, along with the shrine of Lord Parshvanath, the immediate predecessor of Lord Mahavira.

In 1931, Acharya Shantisagar, a Digambara Jain monk arrived in Delhi. He was the first Digambara monk to visit Delhi after a gap of eight centuries. There is a memorial marking this historical occasion.

== Jain Bird Hospital: Ahimsa in Practice ==
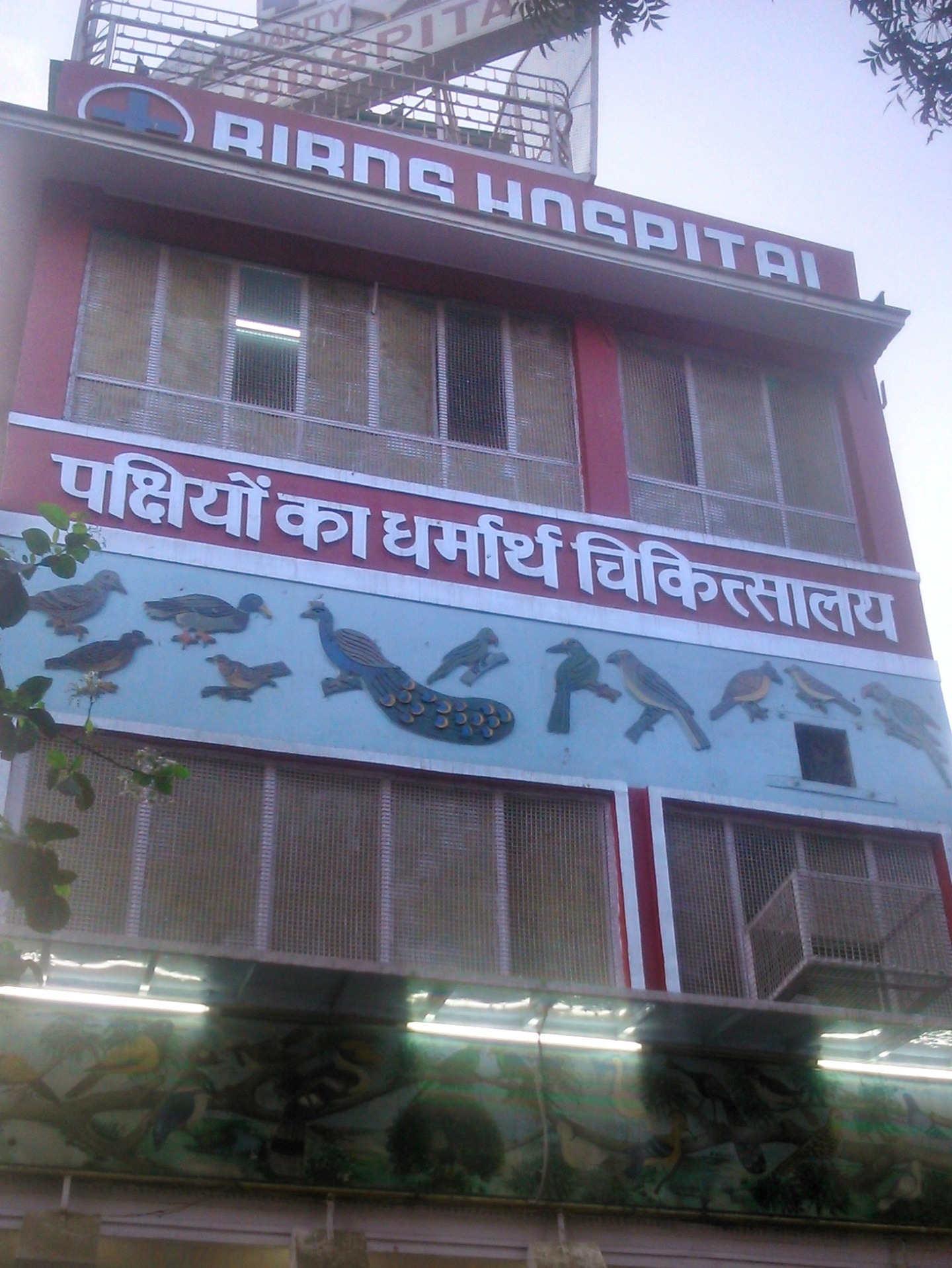
Birds Hospital at Śrī Digambar Jain Lāl Mandir

The temple compound has a famous Bird Hospital. The Birds Hospital, calls itself the only institution of its kind in the world, treats about 15,000 birds a year has been run for 60 years in the building built in 1957 under the instructions of Acharya Deshbhushan Maharaj, hospital itself was started in 1930.

== Cultural Significance ==
The tableau of Delhi depicting Chandni Chowk, with Red fort in front followed by Lal mandir along with Gauri Shankar mandir, Central Baptist Church, Gurudwara Sis Ganj Sahib and Fatehpuri Masjid, during the Republic Day Parade in 2021.

== Visitors ==
There is also a bookstore in the complex where a wide range of books on Jainism is available, apart from unique curios and souvenirs related to the religion. Visitors should take off their shoes and all other leather goods and hand it to the concerned person before they enter the temple complex.

=== Visiting hours ===
Holi to Diwali (Summer times): 5:30 am to 11:30 am & 6:00 pm to 9:30 pm

Diwali to Holi (Winter times): 6:00 am to 12:00 pm & 5:30 pm to 9:00 pm

During the 10 days of Daslakshan Parv or Paryushan Mahaparv, the temple complex is open longer.

The nearest metro station is the Lal Qila (Violet Line).

== Gallery ==
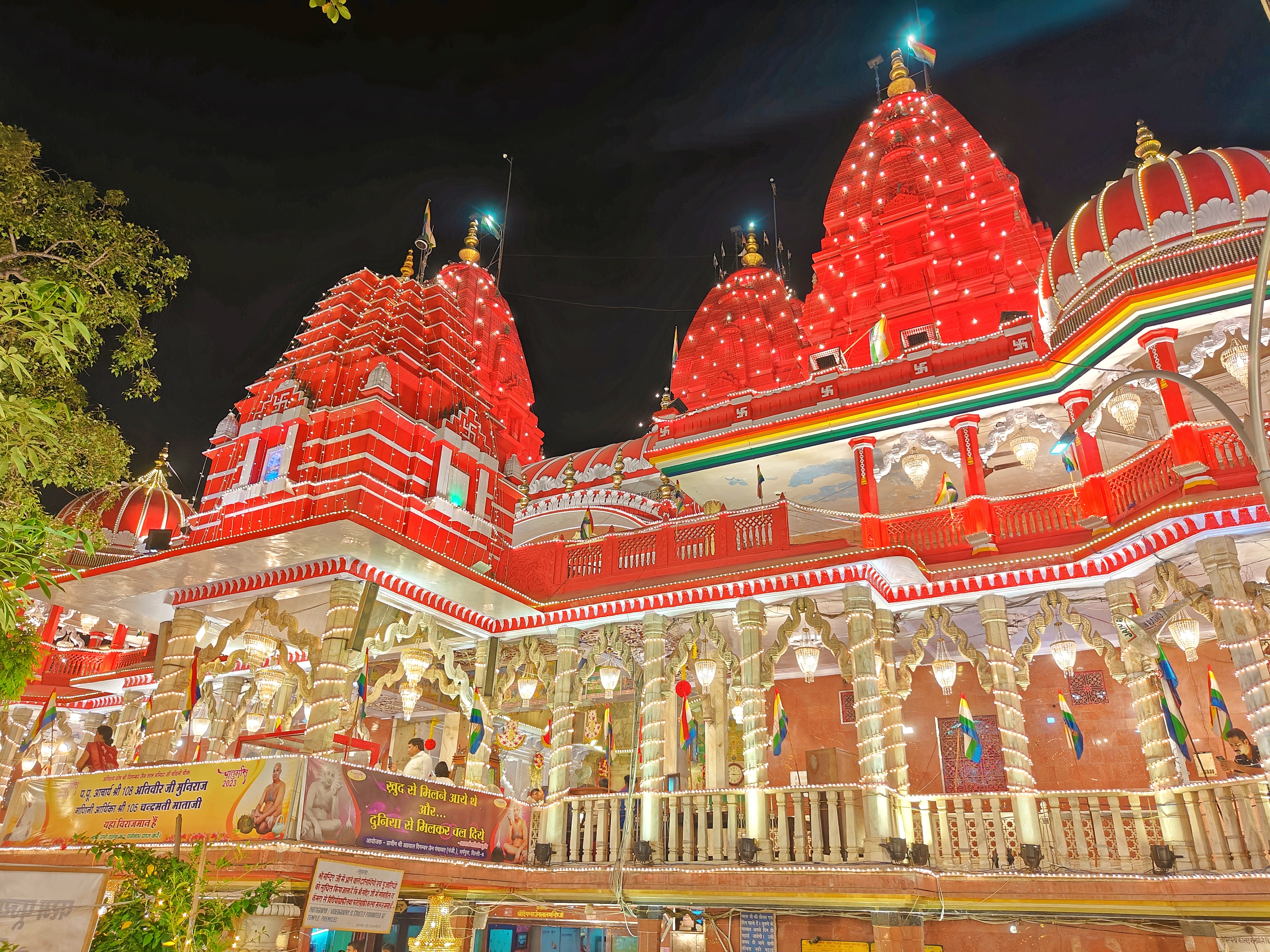
Side view

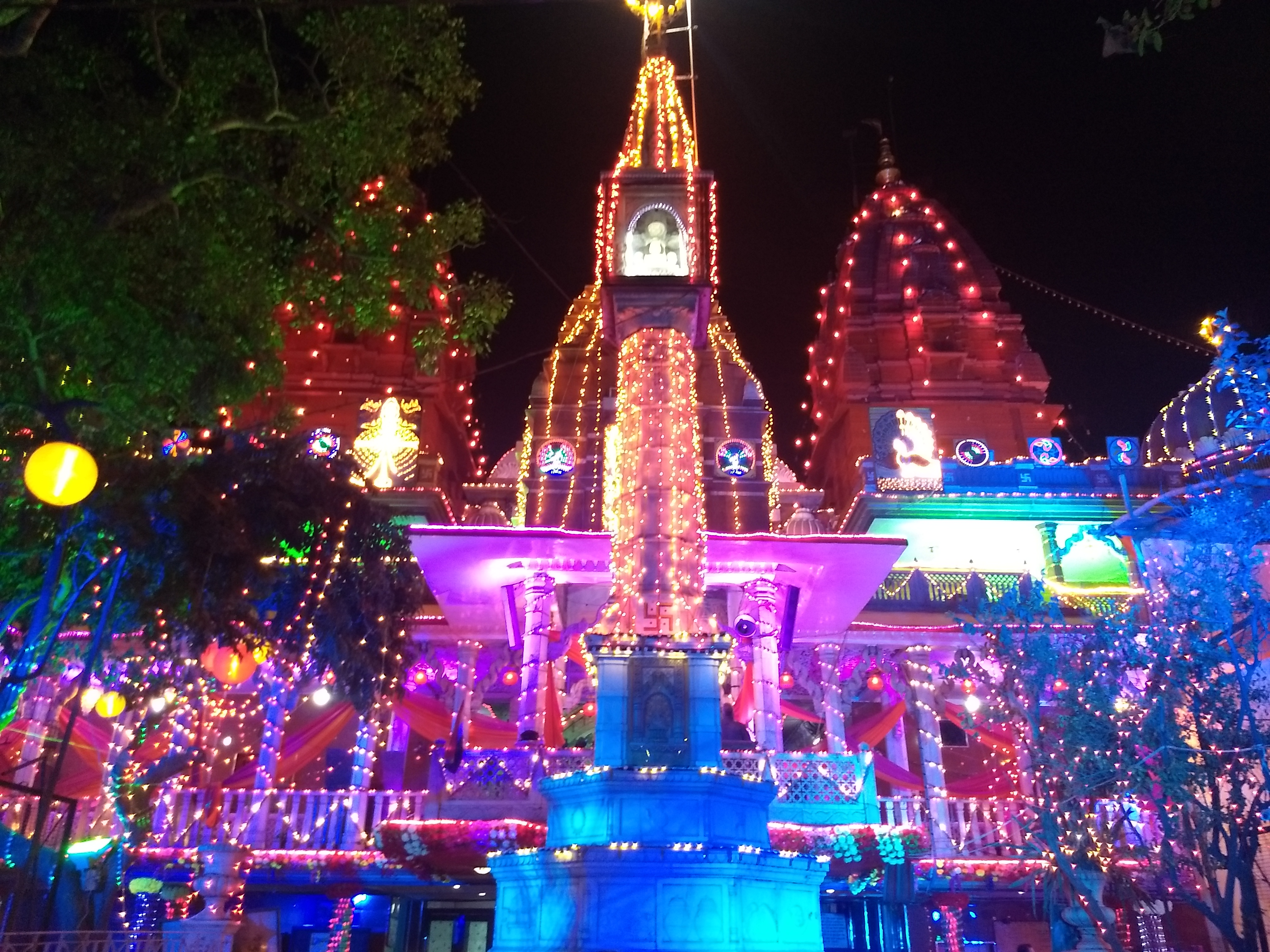
Lal mandir decorated during Vidhaan

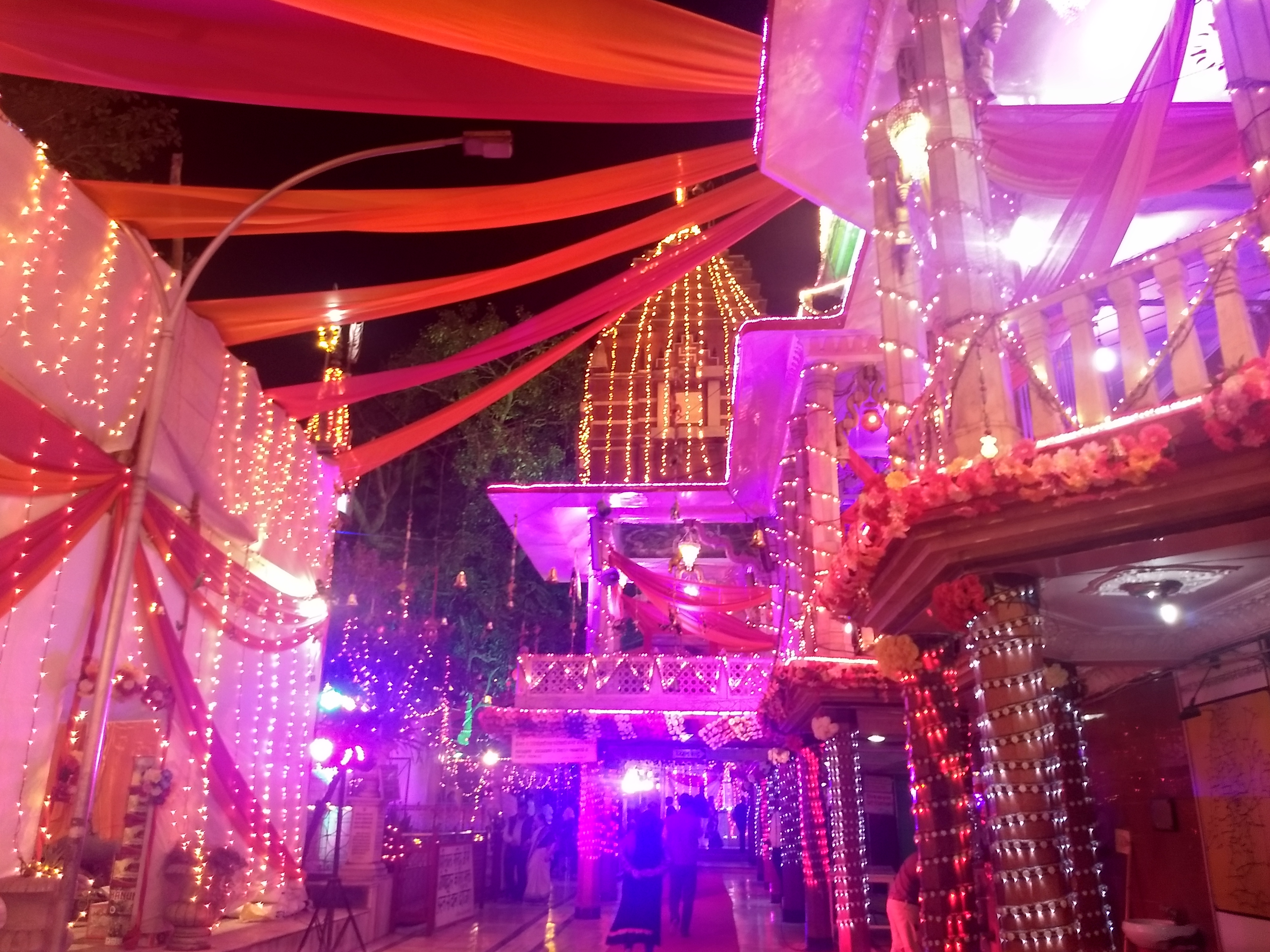
Lal mandir decorated during Vidhaan

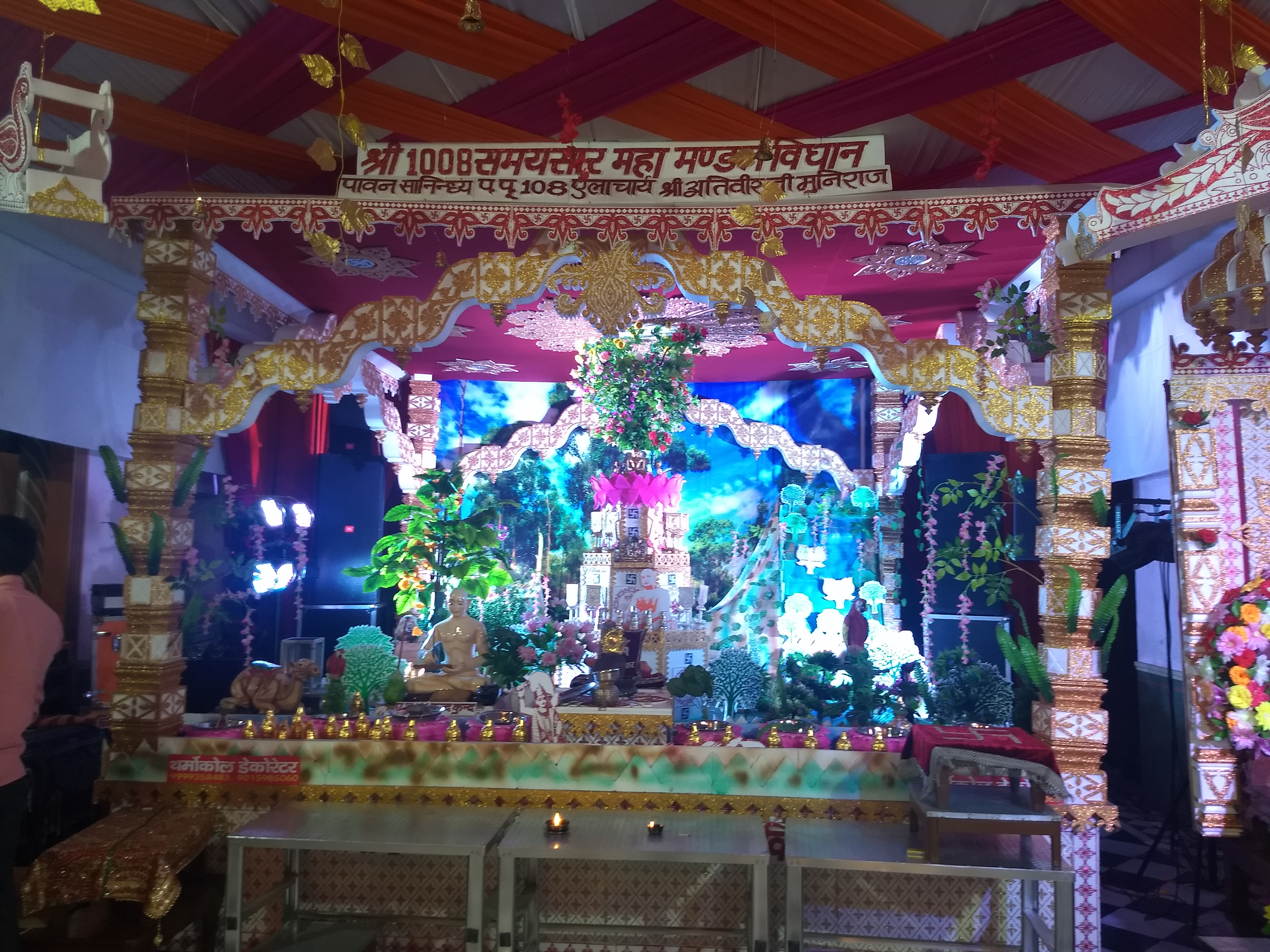
Jhanki during Vidhaan

== See also ==
- Naya Mandir Dharampura
- Jainism in Delhi
- Hanumantal Bada Jain Mandir
