= Naya Mandir =

Jain temple in Old Delhi, India

- नया मन्दिर
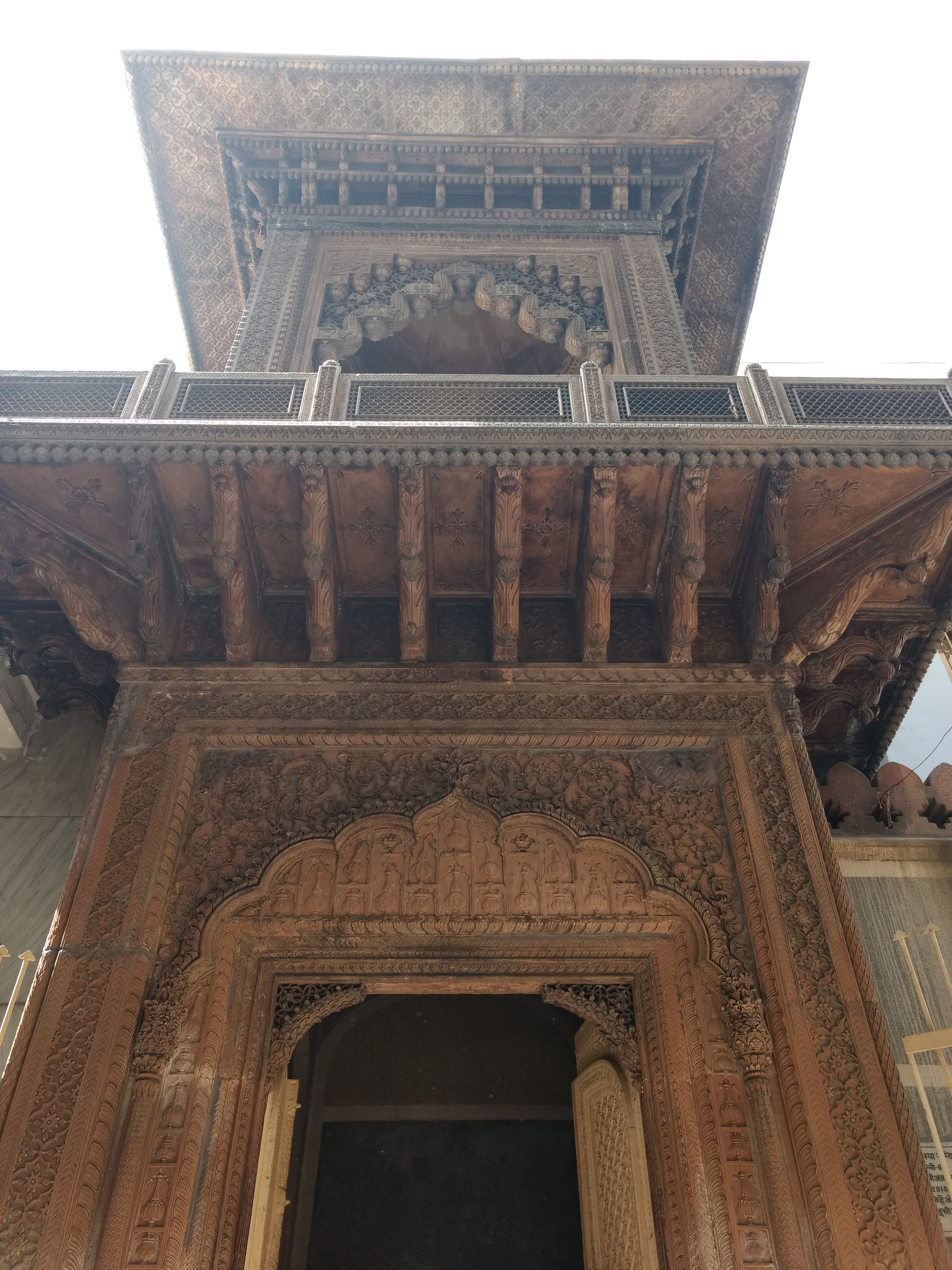
- Naya Mandir, Dharampura, Delhi.

- Lal Mandir

Religion
- Affiliation: Jainism
- Deity: Rishabhanatha
- Festival: Mahavir Jayanti

Location
- Location: Dharampura lane in Chandni Chowk, Old Delhi
- Coordinates: 28°39′10.0″N 77°13′54.4″E

Architecture
- Creator: Raja Harsukh Rai
- Established: 1807
- Temple: 1

Naya Mandir (Hindi: नया मन्दिर, lit. New Temple) is a historic Jain temple in Old Delhi in India, in the Dharampura locality allocated to the Jain community by Aurangzeb.

== History ==
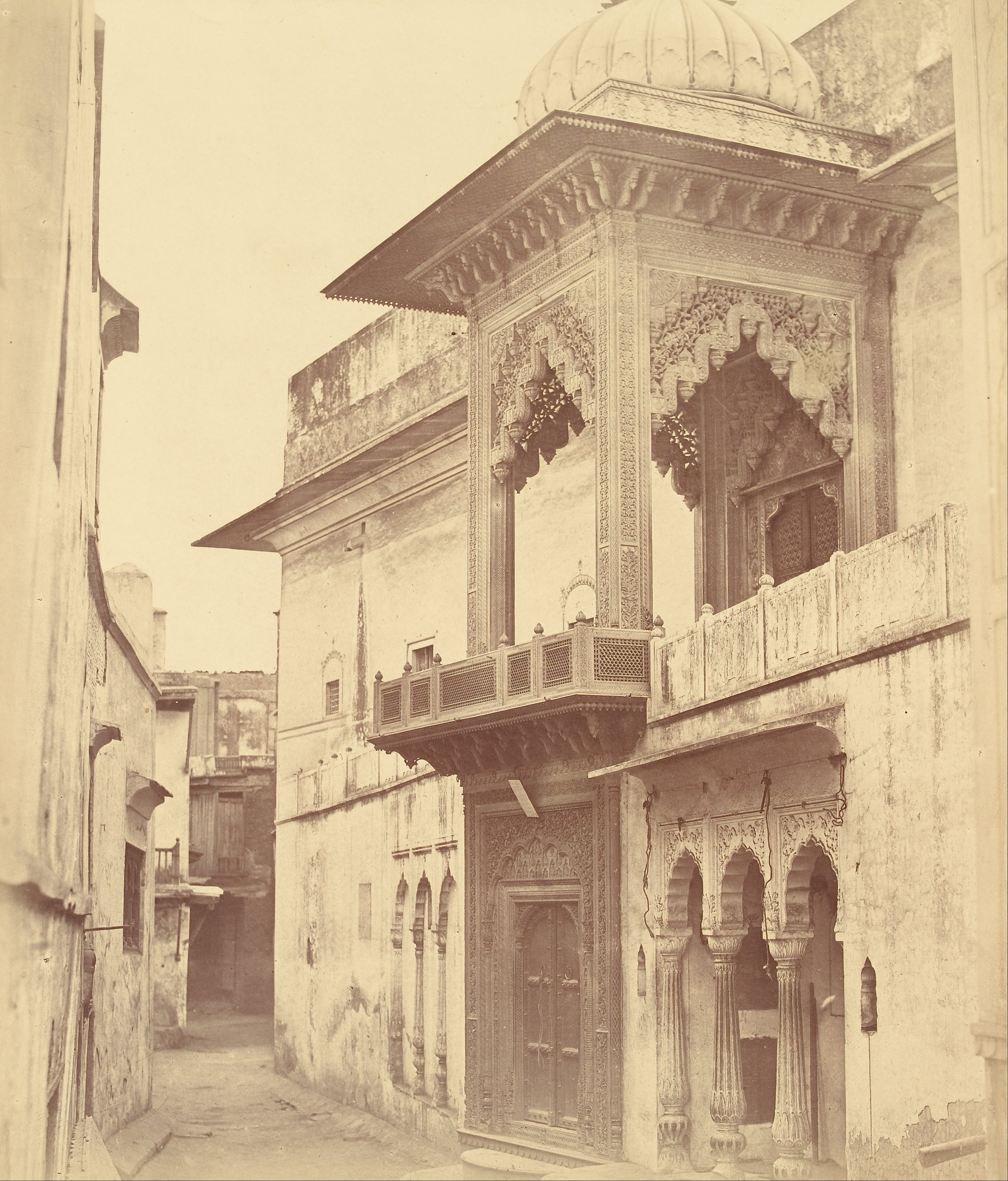
Temple in 1858

Raja Harsukh Rai, a treasurer in the Mughal Empire during the late Mughal period, constructed a large and ornate Jain temple in the Dharampura locality of Old Delhi in 1807 during the rule of Mughal Emperor Akbar II with a cost of about 8 Lakh rupees, then an enormous amount. He was able to obtain the royal permission to construct a shikhara for the temple for the first time during the Mughal rule. Thus temple is known as the Naya Mandir (new temple), since an older Jain temple, now known as the Lal Mandir already existed.

During the festivities of temple consecration (Panch-kalyanak Pratishtha), the festive pandal was raided by a local group and the gold and silver objects (chhatra, chamar, utensils) were plundered. Harsukh Rai complained to the Emperor, who ordered that they be returned.

The temple houses an important collection of manuscripts.

== The Naya Mandir Maha-purana manuscript ==
The Naya Mandir book collection includes a rare illustrated manuscript of Maha-purana of Acharya Jinasena. This manuscript dated to 1420 CE is a rare surviving example of Jain (and Indian) art in early 15th century.

== Concealed chamber ==
At one time many Jain temples contained a concealed chamber (sometimes called bhonyra भोंयरा) to hide statues in troubled times. Naya Mandir also has a concealed chamber. A visitor in 1876 described it:

In Delhi I found a Jain temple which was wholly unknown to Europeans well acquainted with the city; and on prosecuting inquiry, I got its priest to open to me a concealed chamber containing large statues of several of the Tirthankaras richly ornamented.

== Gallery ==
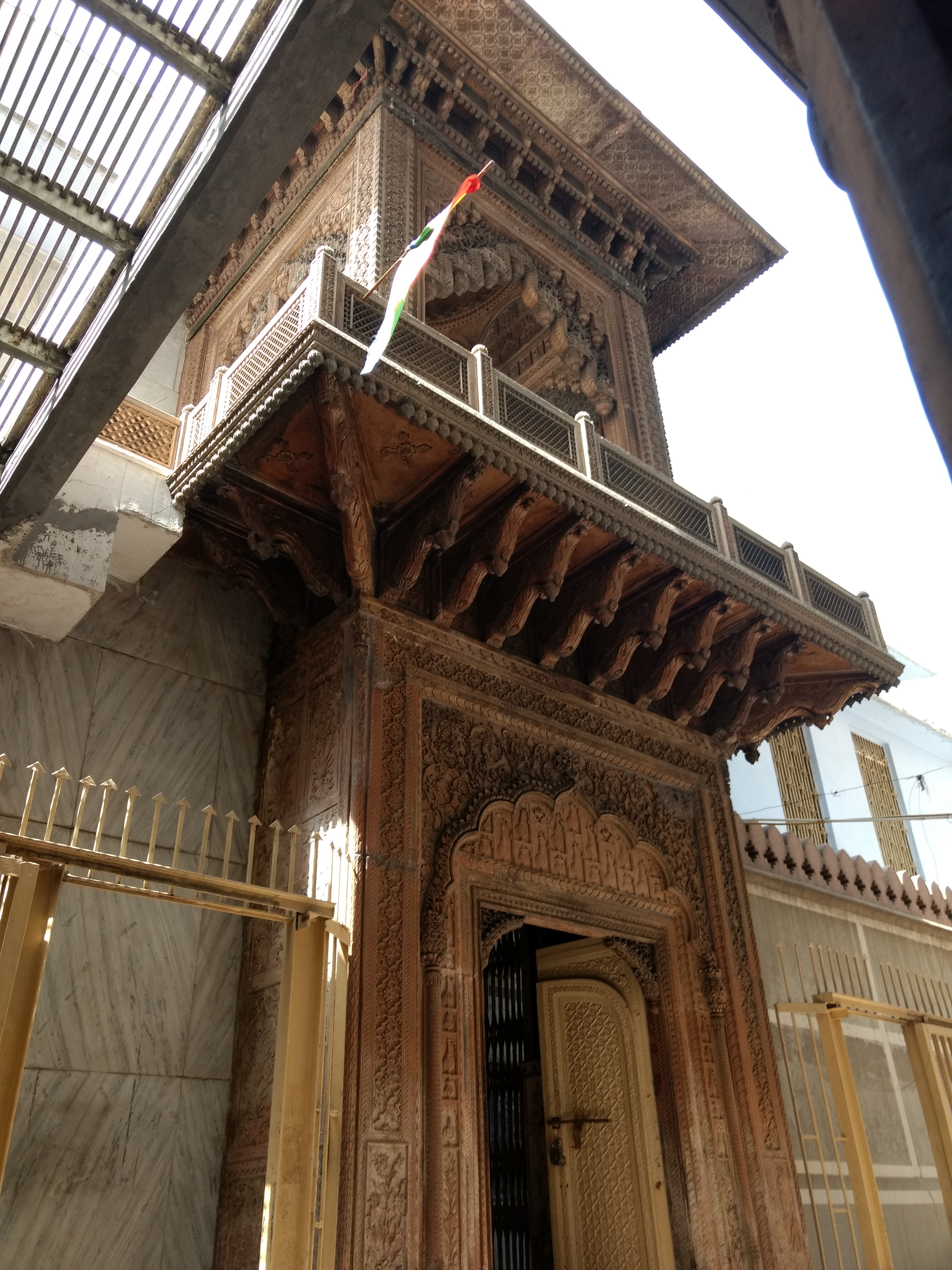
Naya Mandir side view

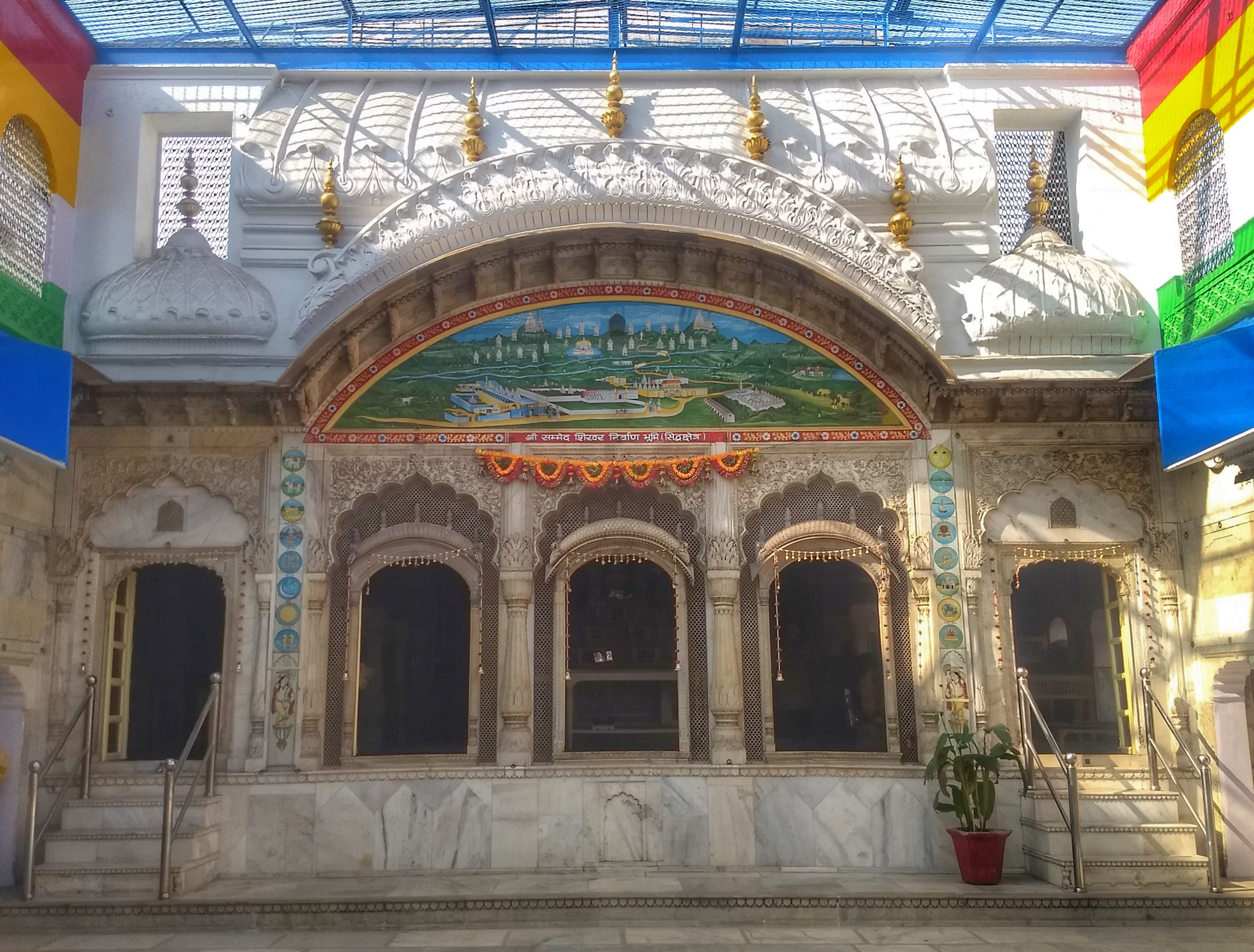
Main complex and Dome Interior

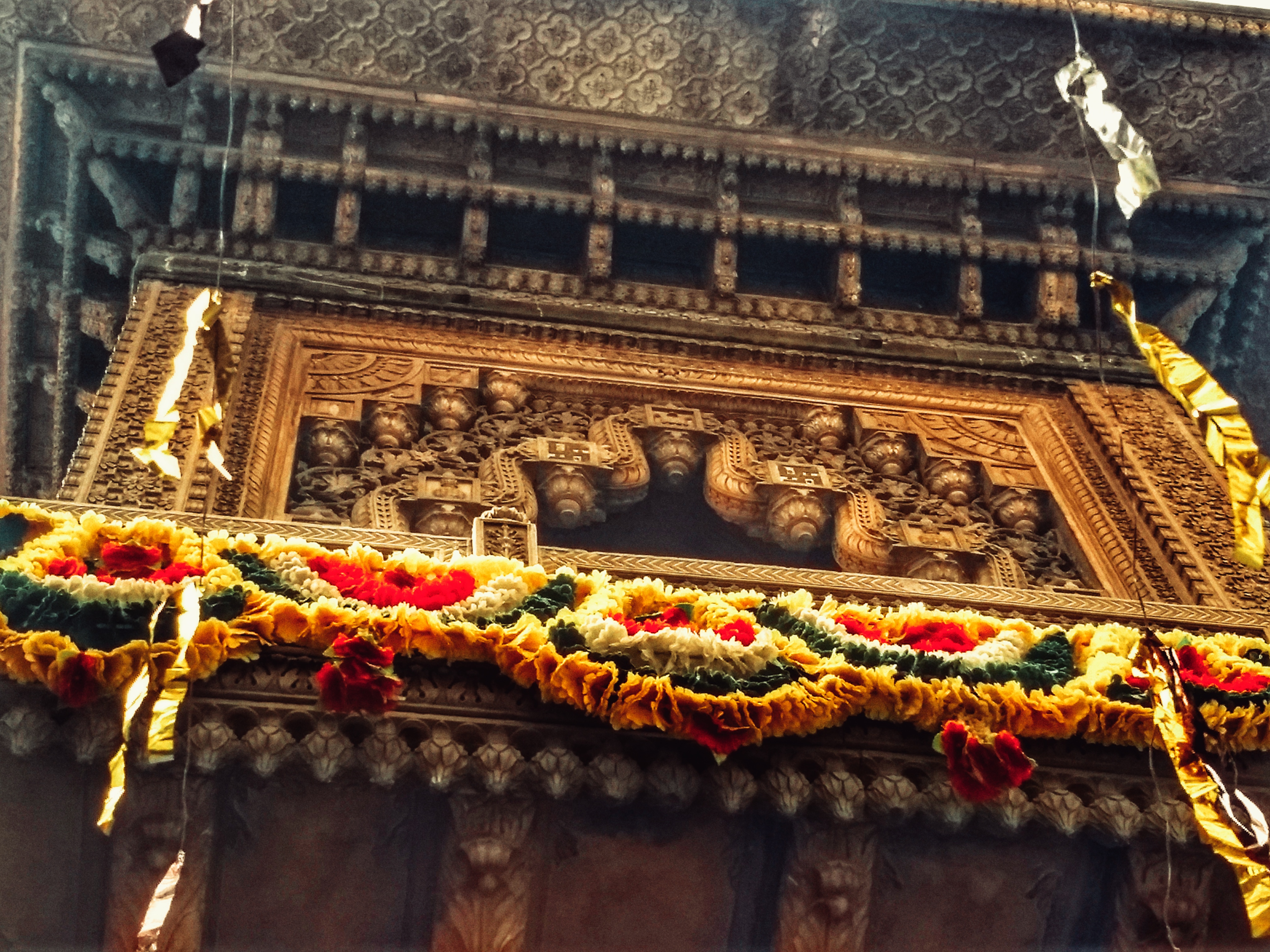
Carvings of Main door

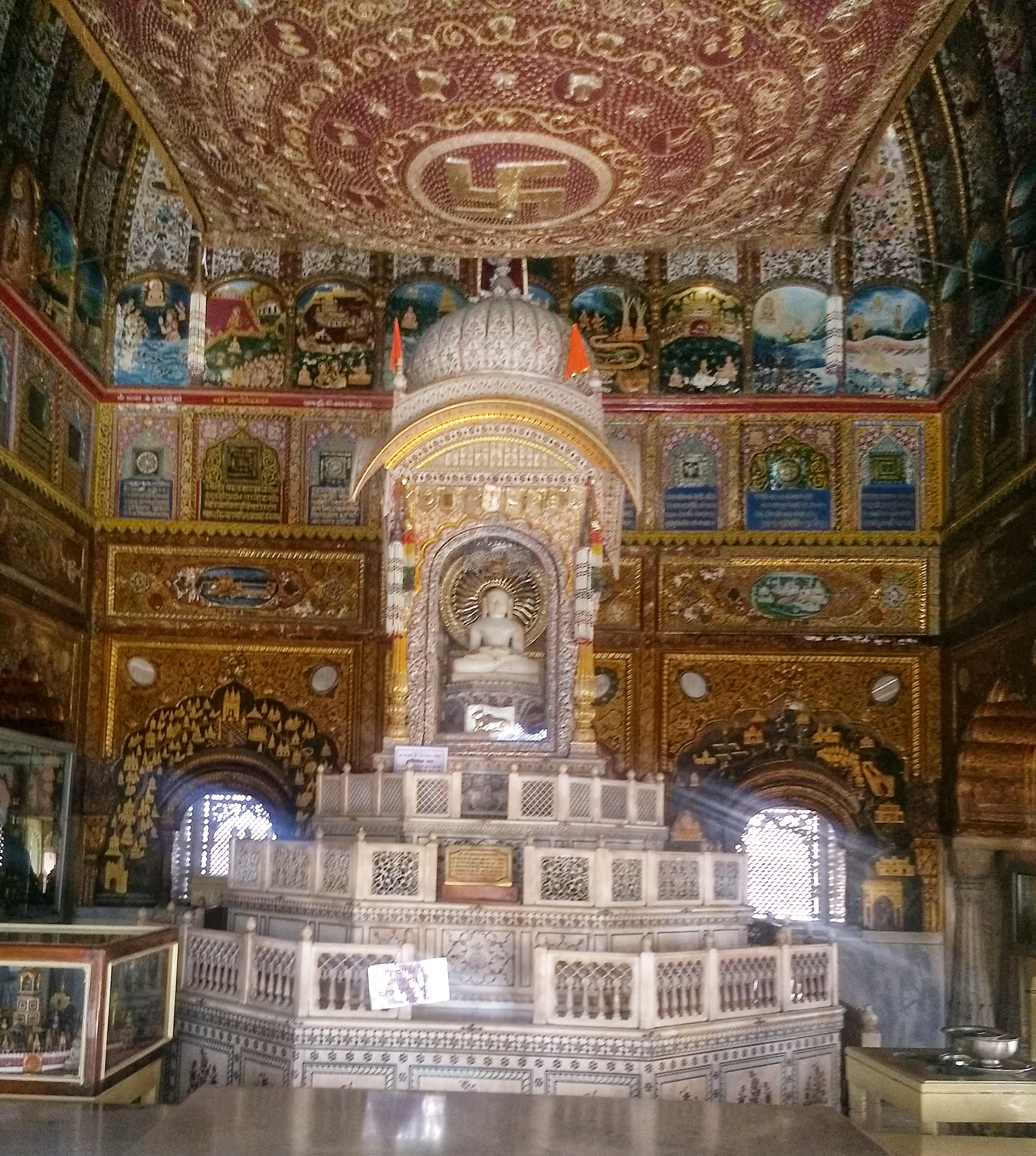
Rishabhanatha Idol

== See also ==
- Sri Digambar Jain Lal Mandir
- Raja Harsukh Rai
- Jainism in Delhi
