= Raja Harsukh Rai =

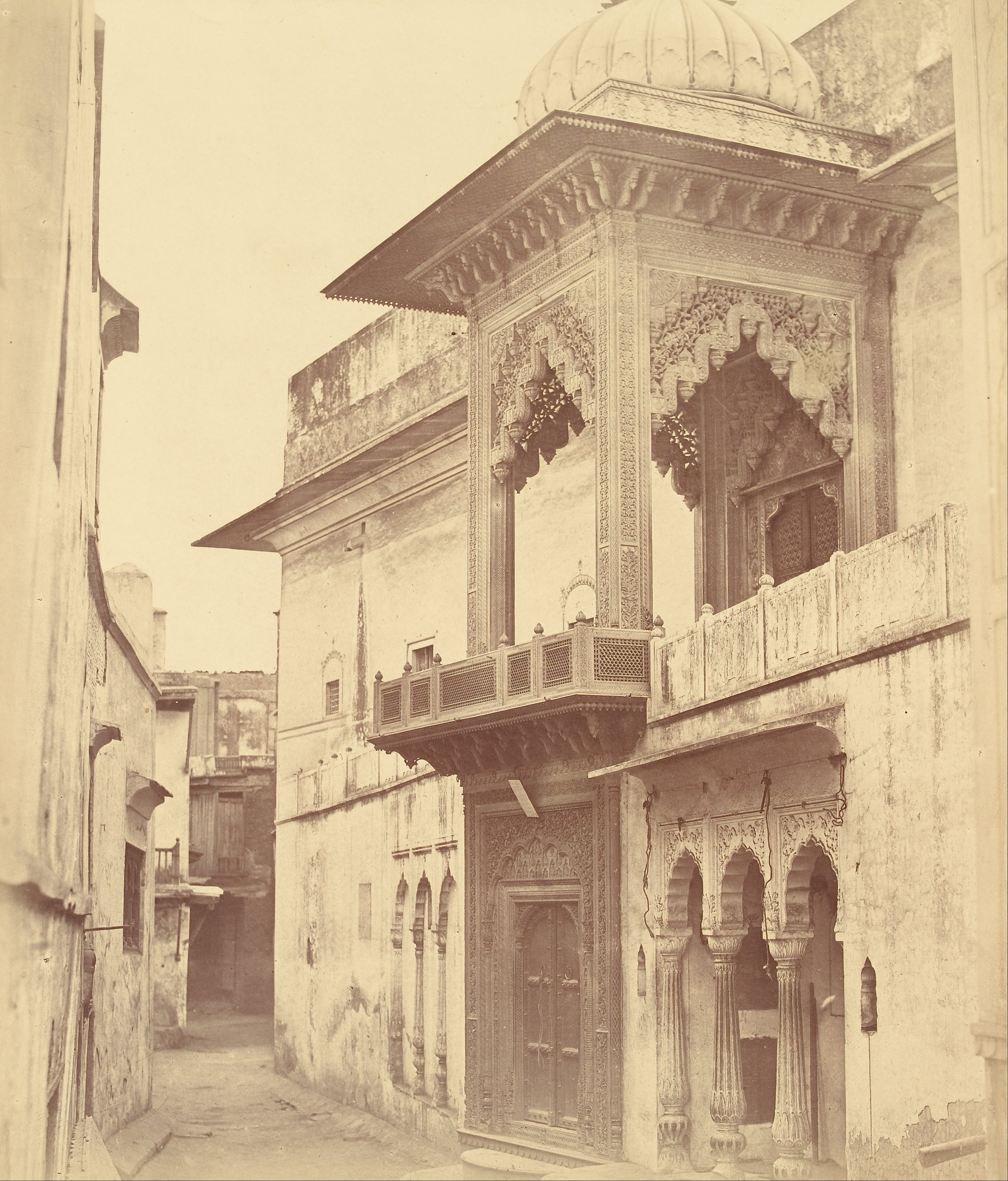
Naya Mandir, Dharampura, Delhi in 1858

Raja Harsukh Rai (early 19th century) the chief of the Agrawal community, and a builder of several Jain temples in and around Delhi, was the imperial treasurer during Sam. 1852-Sam. 1880.

When Shahjahan constructed his now capital city at Delhi in the 17th century, he invited several Jain financiers to come and settle there. They included Sah Dipchand of Hissar, an Agrawal Jain, who constructed 16 havelis for his 16 sons in Dariba Kalan, south of Chandni Chowk. According to other accounts he was invited by Shah Alam II and had five sons.

Harsukh Rai, one of his descendants, was chosen to be the official treasurer by Emperor Shah Alam II, and was given the title Raja. Harsukh Rai constructed a large and ornate Jain temple in the Dharampura locality of Old Delhi in 1807 during the rule of Mughal Emperor Akbar II with a cost of about 8 Lakh rupees, then an enormous amount. He was able to obtain the royal permission to construct a shikhara for the temple for the first time during the Mughal rule. Thus temple is known as the Naya Mandir (new temple), since an older Jain temple, now known as the Lal Mandir already existed.

When the temple construction was almost finished, Harsukh Rai stopped the construction. When the representatives of the Agrawal Jain community approached him and asked about it, he claimed that he has run out of money and needed donations from the community to finish the construction. After accepting modest donations, Harsukh Rai declared the temple to be panchayati (i.e. belonging to the community, rather than himself) and finished the construction.

During the festivities of temple consecration (Panch-kalyanak Pratishtha), the festive pandal was raided by a local group and the gold and silver objects (chhatra, chamar, utensils) were plundered. Harsukh Rai complained to the Emperor, who ordered that they be returned.

In Samvat 1867, he wanted to obtain the imperial permission for a rath-yatra (religious procession) that was traditionally prohibited. He had the Sunehri Masjid regilded. As a reward, he asked the emperor permission to have the rath-yatra.

He and his son Raja Suganchand built numerous Jain temples at

- Patparganj
- Hastinapur
- Karnal
- Sonpat
- Hissar
- Panipat and
- Sanganer

== The Delhi Rath Yatra ==
During most of the Mughal period, the Jains were prohibited from taking out a religious procession. In 1810, Harsukh Rai was able to obtain the permission of the emperor to have a Jain religious procession. The Rath Yatra caused considerable resentment among the non-Jains and resulted in some disturbances.

In 1877, after the Indian Rebellion of 1857, the Jains (called Sarawagi in the records) again sought permission to take out a permission to take out a procession with "50 musicians, one elephant carrying a banner, seven camels bearing flags, fifty palanquins, three chariots ..". This was again opposed by other religious groups which warned about "riots, looting, murder" etc. Eventually the Jains were able to take out the procession, but only through side-streets.

== Prachin Shri Agarwal Digambar Jain Panchayat ==
Seth Girdhari Lal, the son of Raja Shugan Chand, founded the organization Hissar Panipat Agarwal Jain Panchayat. It is now known as Prachin (i.e. old) Shri Agarwal Digambar Jain Panchayat. It is the oldest Agrawal Jain organization. It has been led by descendants of same family. The organization manages the historical Naya Mandir as well as the Lal Mandir.

The Panchayat has been active in promoting unity among Jains of different sectarian backgrounds.

== See also ==
- Agrawal Jain
- Lal Mandir
- Naya Mandir, also built by Raja Harsukh Rai
