= Gulgula (doughnut) =

U.P. traditional sweet doughnut

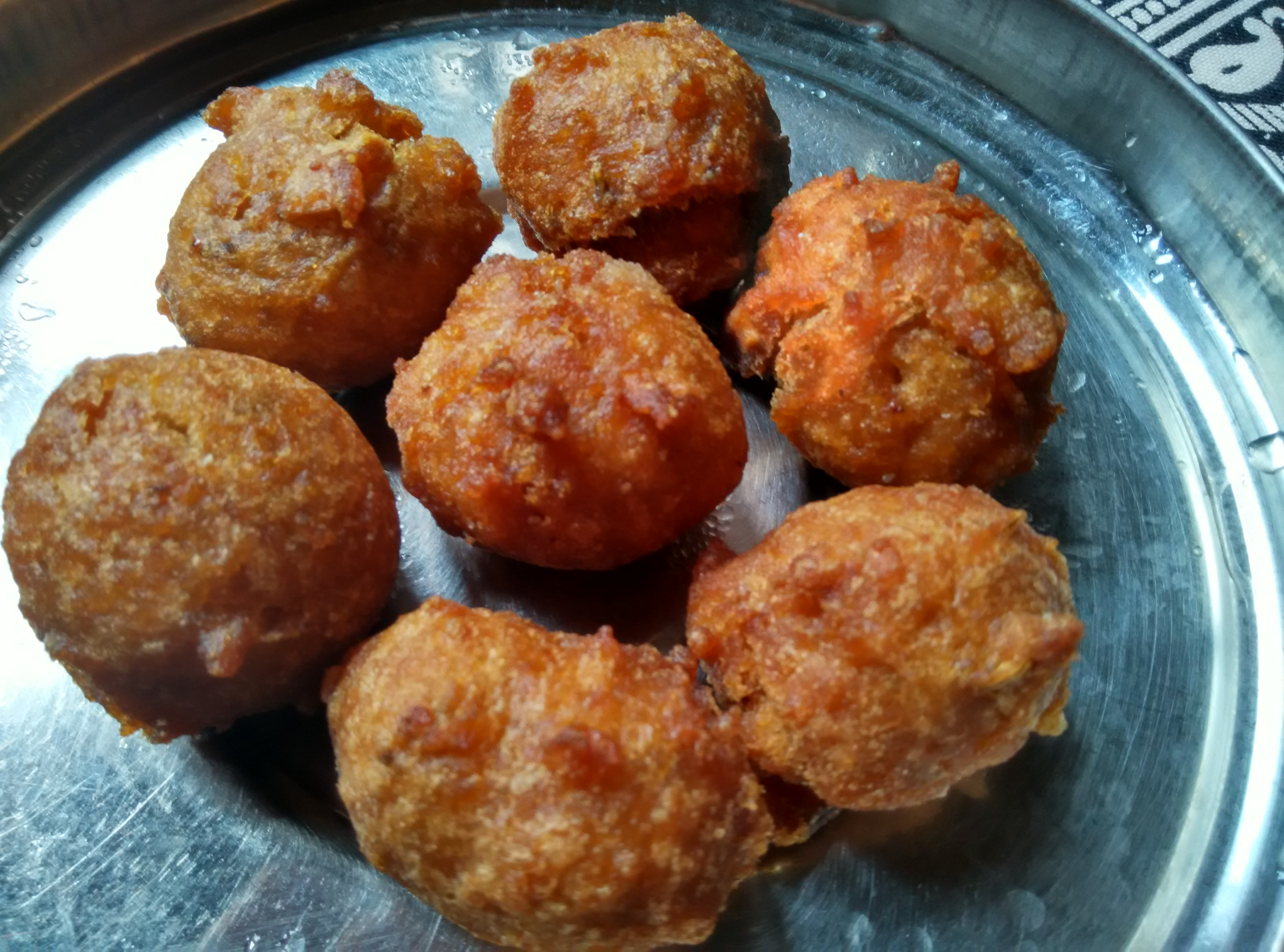
Gulgule are often but not always round

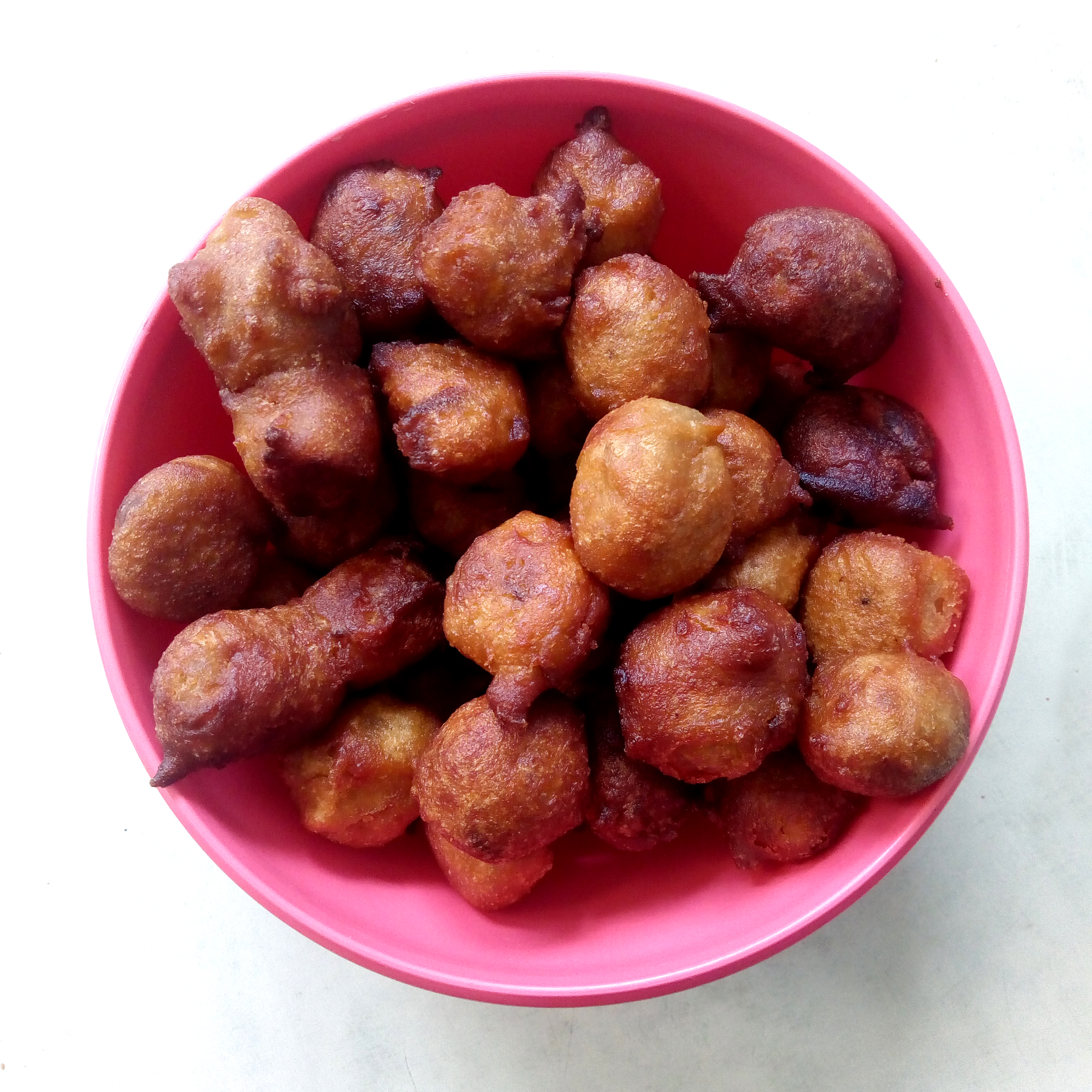
Sweet Gulgule

Gulgula (Bhojpuri: 𑂏𑂳𑂪𑂏𑂳𑂪𑂰, romanized: Gulgula) is a traditional sweet made in different regions of India. It is one of the most popular sweets in the market places, it is traditionally made on specific festive occasions in rural areas. They are common in Uttar Pradesh, Bihar, Punjab, Odisha, Haryana, Rajasthan and are also made by overseas Indians in Guyana, Trinidad and Tobago, Suriname, Jamaica, Mauritius, the United States, South Africa, and Fiji.

They are similar to donut holes in USA, and are very simple to make. They use ordinary wheat flour, sugar (traditionally jaggery), and occasionally spices (fennel seeds are common) for flavoring. Yogurt, banana pulp, yeast or baking powder may be used. They are fried in oil or ghee just like donuts. In the Caribbean, they are made using overripened bananas which are mixed with flour and spices and then fried.

== History ==
Traditionally they were made with jaggery (gud गुड़). There is a popular Hindi expression - गुड़ खाना, गुलगुले से परहेज करना- they eat gud, but avoid gulgulas (that contain gud).

The gulgula confection was first mentioned in Pasanaha Cariu (Parshvanath Charit) of Vibudh Shridhar of 1132 AD., written during the Tomara rule in Delhi, shortly before establishment of the short Chauhan rule.

== See also ==
Similar Indian food

- Adhirasam are a Tamil sweet doughnut
- Makhan Bada (Balushahi), deep fried dough soaked in sugar syrup
- Gulab jamun, buffalo milk–based quick dough that is deep fried and floated in sweet syrup
- Imarti, deep fried fermented dough dipped in syrup with many twists and turns
- Jalebi, deep fried fermented dough dipped in syrup with twists
- Malpua, a related sweet which is flat and is sometimes dipped in syrup
- Vadai are savoury rings of dough made from lentils that are popular in South India

Similar food elsewhere globally

- Doughnut
- List of doughnut varieties
