= Reya =

Reya may refer to:

- Reya (caste), a Hindu caste
- Reya, a synonym of Burchardia, a genus of herbs endemic to Australia
- Reya, a diminutive of the Russian female first name Avreya
- Ivrin Reya Osathanond, real name of Charm Osathanond (b. 1987), Thai actress, model, and host
- Reya, Soviet radar copied by the Chinese as the Type 351 Radar
