= Nattal Sahu =

Indian merchant

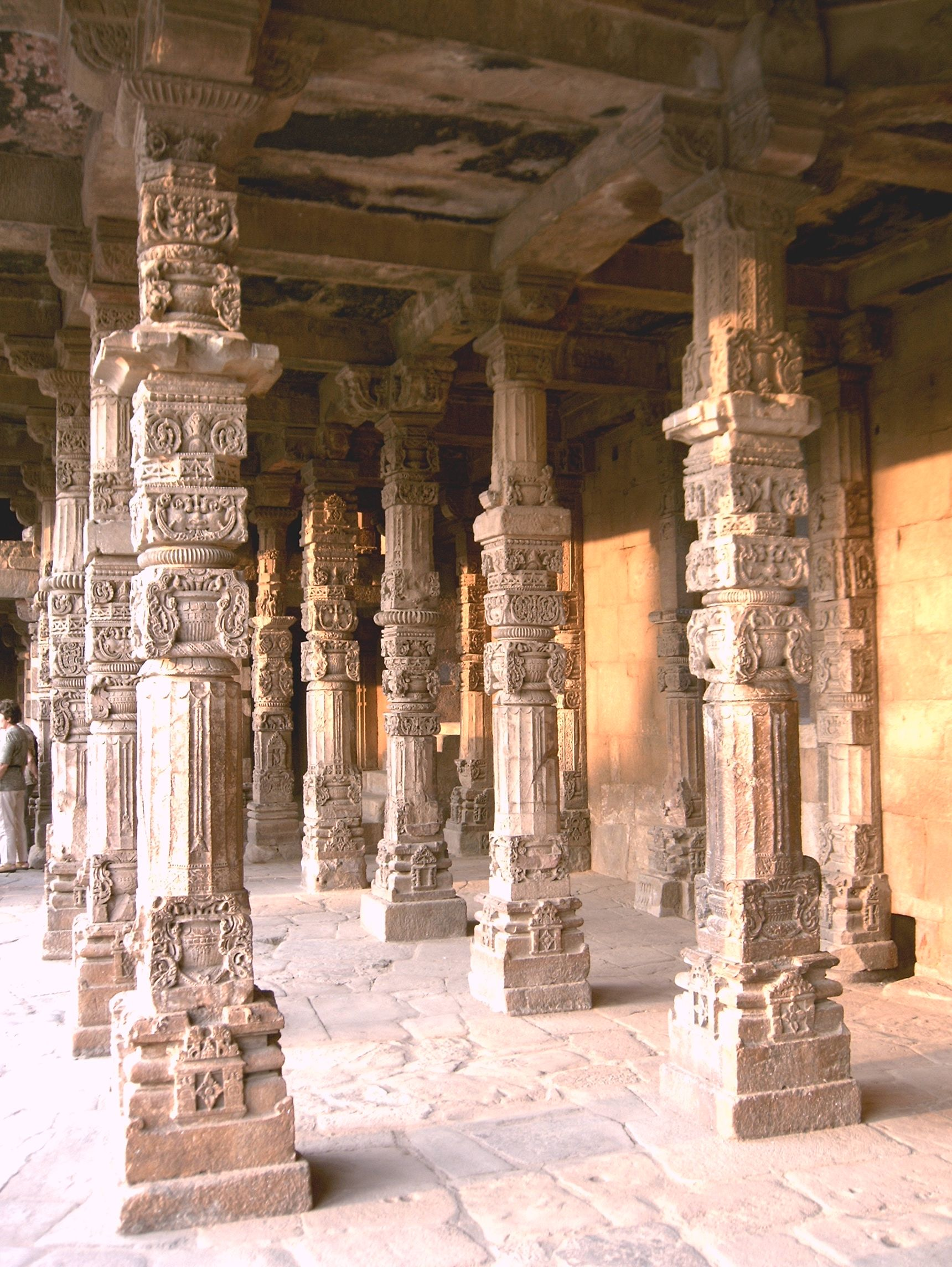
Jain Temple columns reused in the Quwwat-ul-Islam mosque at Qutb complex

Nattal Sahu of Yoginipur (now Mehrauli, Delhi) is the earliest known Agrawal Jain merchant-prince, who lived during the reign Tomara king, Anangapal. His biography is in the Apabhramsha text Pasanaha Cariu (Parshvanath Caritra) of the poet Vibudh Shridhar, written in 1132 CE.

Nattal's father was Sahu Joja. He had two older brothers Raghav and Sodhal. Nattal was the chief of the Jains of Delhi. He controlled a commercial empire spread through Anga, Vanga (Bengal), Kalinga (Odisha), Karnataka, Nepal, Bhot (Tibet), Panchal, Chedi, Gauda, Thakka (Punjab), Kerala, Marahatta (Maharashtra), Bhadanaka (Bayana), Magadh, Gurjar, Sorath (Saurashtra) and Haryana. He was also a minister in the court of Anangapal.

It is believed that fragments of this temple were used for the Quwwat-al-Islam mosque near Qutab Minar.

== See also ==
- Agrawal Jain
- Apabhramsha
- Jainism
- Qutub complex
