= Agrawal Jain =

Indian Jain community

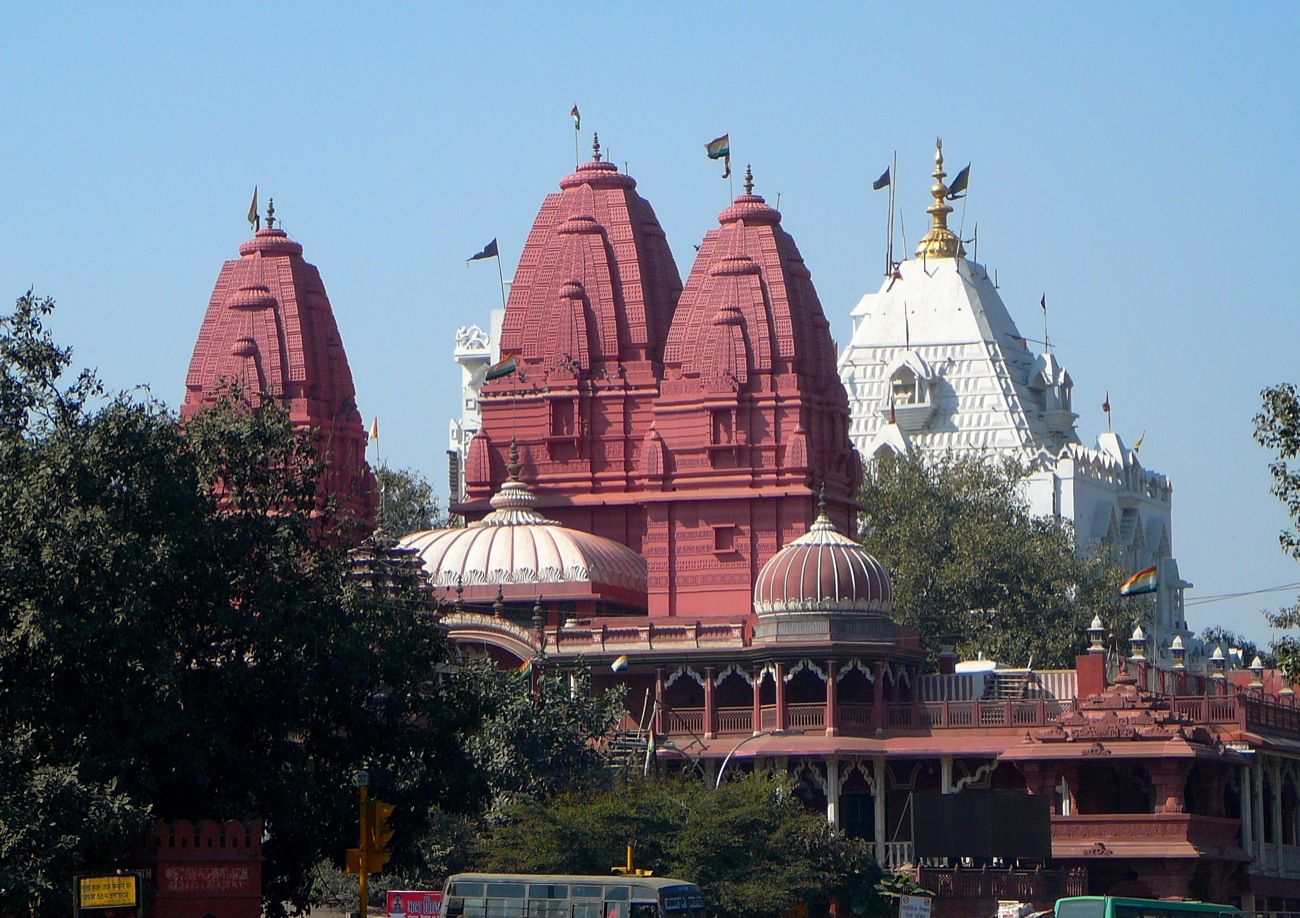
- Sri Digambar Jain Lal Mandir
- Religions: Jainism
- Languages: Haryanvi, Hindi, Rajasthani
- Populated states: Haryana, Uttar Pradesh, Rajasthan

Agrawal Jains are an Indian Jain community who originated from Agroha near Hisarin what is now the state of Haryana. In Sanskrit inscriptions and texts, the community is termed Agrotakanvaya.

== History ==
=== Agrawal Jains in Delhi ===
The Agrawal merchant Nattal Sahu and the Agrawal poet Vibudh Shridhar lived during the rule of Tomara Anangapal of Yoginipur (now Mehrauli, near Delhi). Vibudh Shridhar wrote Pasanahacariu in 1132, which includes a historical account of Yoginipur (early Delhi near Mehrauli) then.

In 1354, Firuz Shah Tughluq started the construction of a new city near Agroha called Hisar-e Feroza "Firuz's Fort". Most of the raw material for building the town was brought from Agroha. Hisar was a major center of the Agrawal community.

Some Agrawals rose to good positions in Mughal period, specially during Akbar. Sahu Todar was a supervisor of the royal mint at Agra, who had rebuilt the 514 Jain stupas at Mathura in 1573, during the rule of Akbar.

Sah Ranveer Singh was a royal treasurer during the rule of Akbar. He established the town Saharanpur. His father as well as son and grandson had built several Jain temples, including the one at Kucha Sukhanand in Delhi.

=== Agrawal Jains in Rajput Kingdoms ===
In the early 15th century, Agrawals flourished as a trader community under the Tomaras of Gwalior.

Historian K.C. Jain comments:

Golden Age of the Jain Digambar Church in Gwalior under the Tomara rulers inspired by the Kashtha Bhattarakas and their Jain Agrawal disciples who dominated the Court of father and son viz. Dungar Singh (1425–1459) and Kirti Singh (1459–1480) with the Poet-Laureate Raighu as their mouthpiece and spokesman, a centenarian author of as many as thirty books, big and small of which two dozen are reported to be extant today. Verify the advent of the Hisar-Firuza-based Jain Agrawals who functioned as the ministers and treasurers of the ruling family had turned the Rajput State of Gwalior into a Digambara Jain Centre par excellence representing the culture of the Agrawal multi-millionner shravakas as sponsored by them.

In the 15th century, many Agrawals migrated to Amer kingdom (now Jaipur). In VS 1535, Agrawal Nenasi conducted a Panch-kalyanak Pratishtha ceremony at Sanganer. A copy of Amarsen Chariu copied in VS 1577 at Sonipat was found at Amer, suggesting that Agrawals took sacred texts with them during this migration.

== Prachin Shri Agarwal Digambar Jain Panchayat ==
Seth Girdhari Lal, the son of Raja Shugan Chand, founded the organization Hissar Panipat Agarwal Jain Panchayat. It is now known as Prachin (i.e. old) Shri Agarwal Digambar Jain Panchayat. It is the oldest Agrawal Jain organization. It has been led by descendants of same family. The organization manages the historical Naya Mandir as well as the Lal Mandir.

The Panchayat has been active in promoting unity among Jains of different sectarian backgrounds.

== Notable people ==
- Jinendra Varni compiler of the five volume "Jainendra Siddhanta Kosha" and Saman Suttam compilation.

== See also ==
- Khandelwal Jain
- Shrimal Jain
- Agrasen ki Baoli
- Jainism in Delhi
- Jainism in Bundelkhand
