= Iron pillar of Delhi =

Historic pillar in the Mehrauli district of Delhi, India

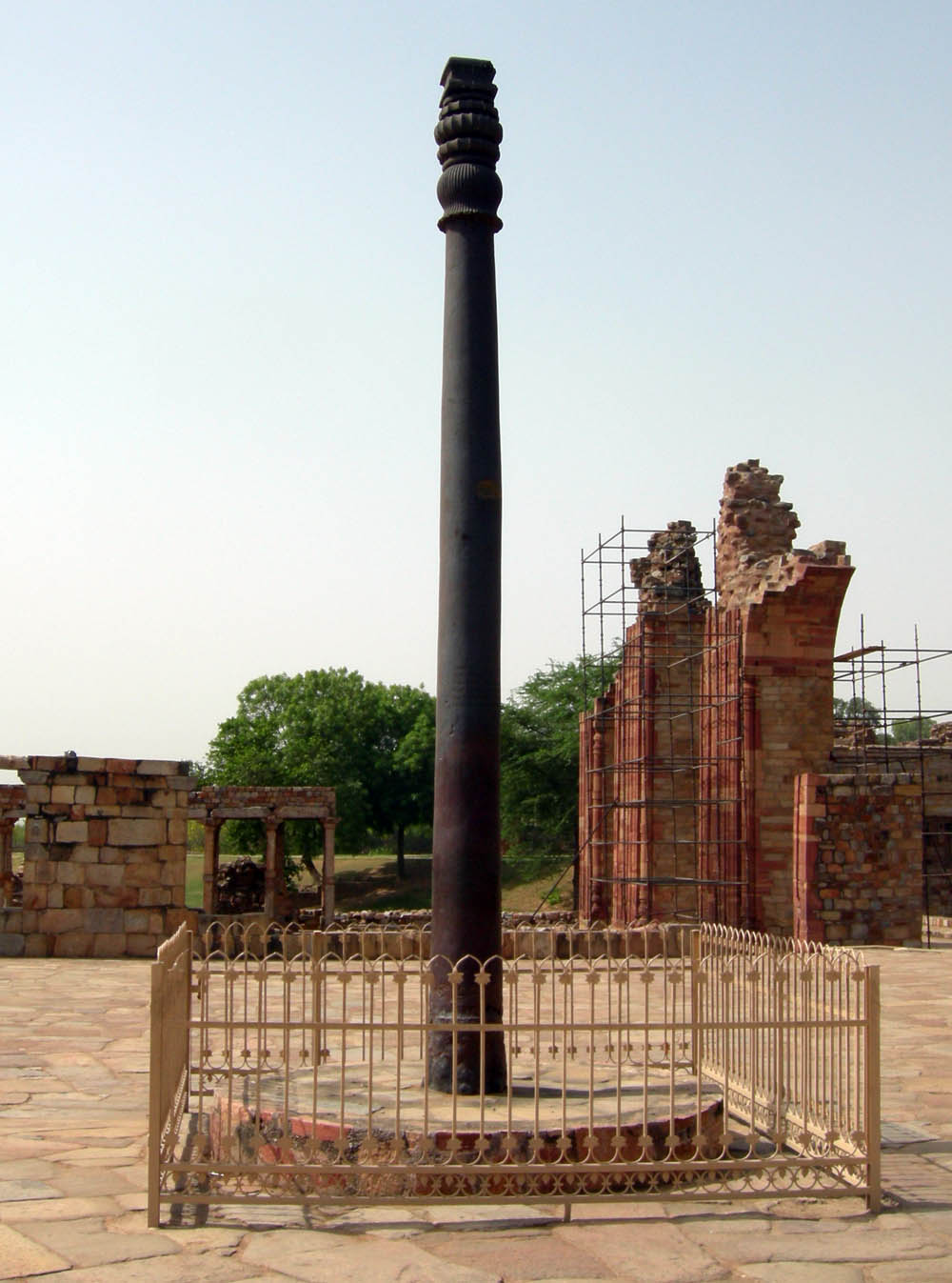
- Interactive map of Iron pillar of Delhi
- 28°31′28.76″N 77°11′6.25″E
- Location: Qutb Minar complex, Delhi, India

History
- Built: 5th century CE

Site notes
- Architect: Chandragupta II
- Architectural style: Hindu architecture

UNESCO World Heritage Site
- Type: Cultural
- Criteria: iv
- Designated: 1993 (17th session)
- Part of: Qutb Minar and its monuments
- Region: India

The iron pillar of Delhi is a metal structure 7.21 metres (23 feet 8 inches) high with a 41-centimetre (16 in) diameter that was constructed by Chandragupta II (reigned c. 375–415 CE), and now stands in the Qutb complex at Mehrauli in Delhi, India.

The metals used in its construction have a rust-resistant composition. The pillar weighs more than six tonnes and is thought to have been erected elsewhere, possibly outside the Udayagiri Caves, and moved to its present location by Anangpal Tomar in the 11th century.

== Physical description ==
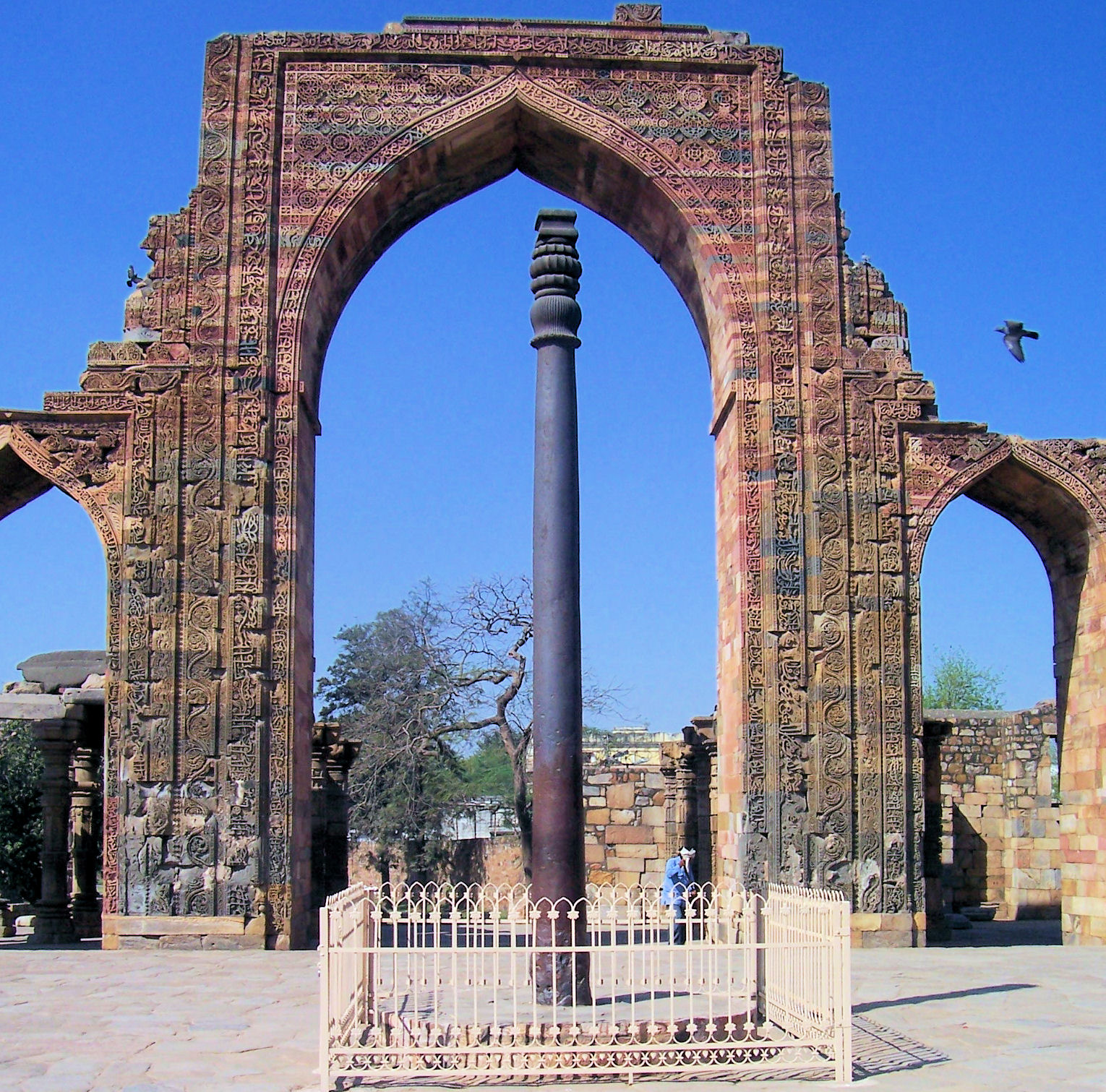
The iron pillar stands within the courtyard of Quwwat-ul-Islam Mosque.

The height of the pillar, from the top to the bottom of its base, is 7.21 m (23 ft 8 in), 1.12 m (3 ft 8 in) of which is below ground. Its bell pattern capital is 306 mm (12 in). It is estimated to weigh more than six tonnes (13,000 lb).

The pillar has attracted the attention of archaeologists and materials scientists because of its high resistance to corrosion and has been called a "testimony to the high level of skill achieved by the ancient Indian iron smiths in the extraction and processing of iron". The corrosion resistance results from an even layer of crystalline iron(III) hydrogen phosphate hydrate forming on the high-phosphorus-content iron, which serves to protect it from the effects of the Delhi climate.

== Inscriptions ==
The pillar carries a number of inscriptions of different dates.

=== Inscription of King Chandra or Chandragupta II ===
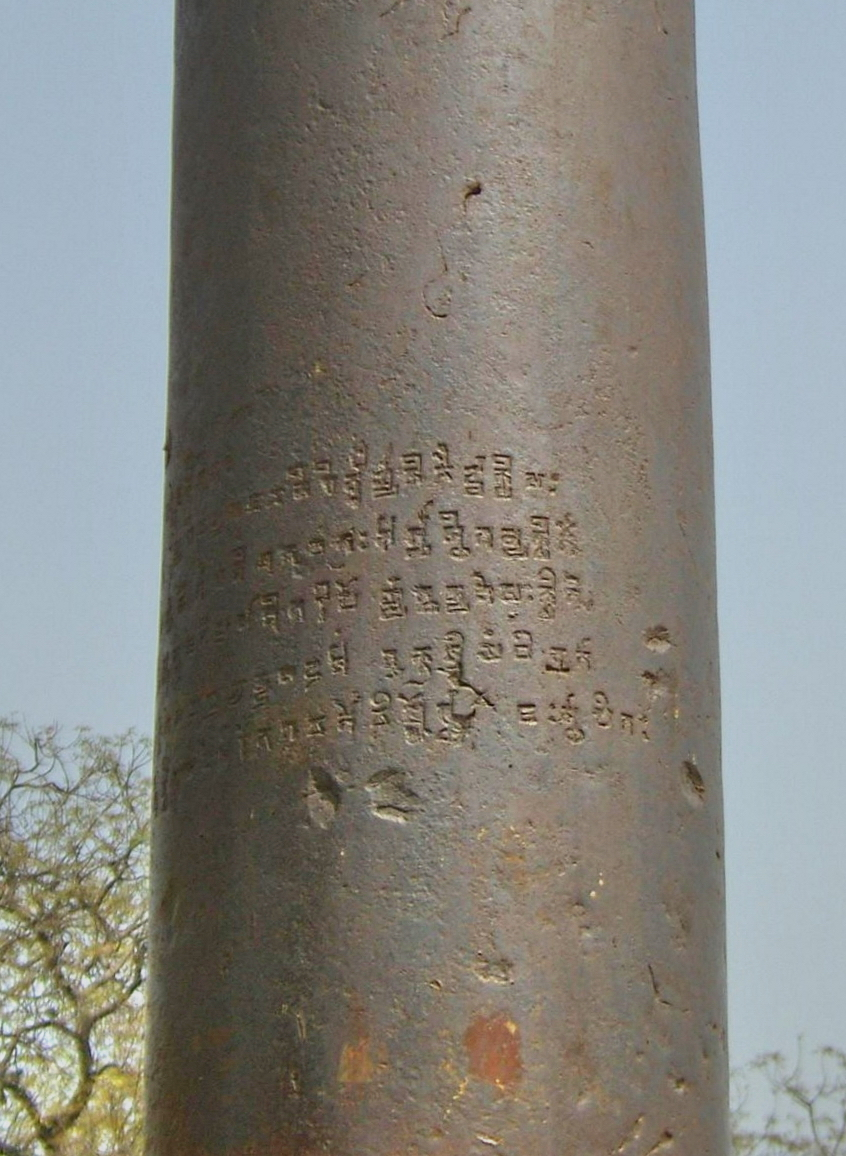
Detail showing the inscription of King Chandragupta II

The oldest inscription on the pillar is that of a king named Chandra (IAST: Candra), generally identified as the Gupta emperor Chandragupta II.

==== Inscription ====
The inscription covers an area of 2′9.5″× 10.5″(65.09 cm x 26.67 cm). The ancient writing is preserved well because of the corrosion-resistant iron on which it is engraved. However, during the engraving process, iron appears to have closed up over some of the strokes, making some of the letters imperfect.

It contains verses composed in Sanskrit language, in shardulvikridita metre. It is written in the eastern variety of the Gupta script. The letters vary from 0.3″ to 0.5″ in size, and resemble closely to the letters on the Allahabad Pillar inscription of Samudragupta. However, it had distinctive mātrās (diacritics), similar to the ones in the Bilsad inscription of Kumaragupta I. While the edges of the characters on the Allahabad inscription are more curved, the ones on the Delhi inscription have more straight edges. This can be attributed to the fact that the Prayagraj inscription was inscribed on softer sandstone, while the Delhi inscription is engraved on the harder material (iron). The text has some unusual deviations from the standard Sanskrit spelling, such as:

- pranśu instead of praṃśu: the use of dental nasal instead of anusvāra
- mūrtyā instead of mūrttyā: omission of the second t
- kīrtyā instead of kīrttyā: omission of the second t
- śattru instead of śatru (enemy): an extra t

==== Studies ====
In 1831, the East India Company officer William Elliott made a facsimile of the inscription. Based on this facsimile, in 1834, James Prinsep published a lithograph in the Journal of the Royal Asiatic Society of Great Britain and Ireland. However, this lithograph did not represent every word of the inscription correctly. Some years later, British engineer T. S. Burt made an ink impression of the inscription. Based on this, in 1838, Prinsep published an improved lithograph in the same journal, with his reading of the script and translation of the text.

Decades later, Bhagwan Lal Indraji made another copy of the inscription on a cloth. Based on this copy, Bhau Daji Lad published a revised text and translation in 1875, in Journal of the Bombay Branch of the Royal Asiatic Society. This reading was the first one to correctly mention the king's name as Chandra. In 1888, John Faithfull Fleet published a critical edition of the text in Corpus Inscriptionum Indicarum.

In 1945, Govardhan Rai Sharma dated the inscription to the first half of the 5th century CE, on paleographic grounds. He observed that its script was similar to the writing on other Gupta-Era inscriptions, including the ones discovered at Bilsad (415 CE), Baigram (449 CE), and Kahanum (449 CE). R. Balasubramaniam (2005) noted that the characters of the Delhi inscription closely resembled the dated inscriptions of Chandragupta II, found at Udayagiri in Madhya Pradesh.

==== Issuance ====
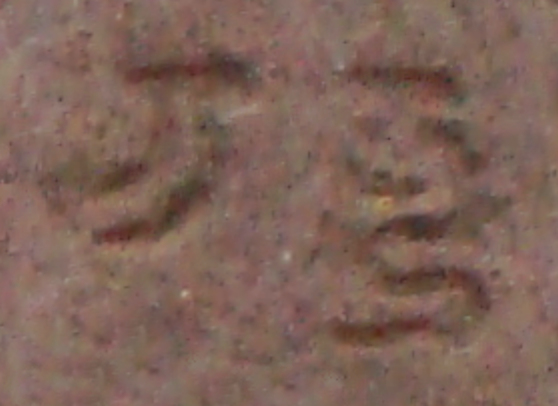
The name "Candra" on the iron pillar of Delhi, thought to represent Chandragupta II. Gupta script: letter "Ca", followed by the conjunct consonant "ndra" formed of the vertical combination of the three letters n d and r.

The inscription is undated, and contains a eulogy of a king named Candra, whose dynasty it does not mention. The identity of this king, and thus the date of the pillar, has been the subject of much debate. The various viewpoints about the identity of the issuer were assembled and analyzed in a volume edited by M. C. Joshi and published in 1989.

The king is now generally identified with the Gupta King Chandragupta II. This identification is based on several points:

- The script and the poetic style of the inscription, which point to a date in the late fourth or early fifth century CE: the Gupta period.
- The inscription describes the king as a devotee of the God Vishnu, and records the erection of a dhvaja ("standard", or pillar) of Vishnu, on a hill called Viṣṇupada ("hill of the footprint of Viṣṇu"). Other Gupta inscriptions also describe Chandragupta II as a Bhagavata (devotee of Vishnu). The names of the places mentioned in the inscription are also characteristic of the Gupta Era. For example, Dakṣiṇa Jalanidhi (the Indian Ocean) and Vaṅga (the Bengal region).
- The short name 'Candra' is inscribed on the archer-type gold coins of Chandragupta II, while his full name and titles appear in a separate, circular legend on the coin.
- A royal seal of Chandragupta's wife Dhruvadevi contains the phrase Śrī Viṣṇupada-svāmī Nārāyaṇa ("Nārāyaṇa, the lord of the illustrious Viṣṇupada").

As the inscription is a eulogy and states that the king has abandoned the earth, there has been some discussion as to whether it is posthumous, i.e. whether King Chandra was dead when the record was created. Dasharatha Sharma (1938) argued that it was non-posthumous. According to B. Chhabra and G. S. Gai, the inscription states that the king's mind is "fixed upon Vishnu with devotion", and therefore, indicates that the king was alive at the time. They theorize that it may have been recorded when Chandragupta II abdicated his throne, and settled down as a vanaprastha (retiree) in Viṣṇupada.

==== Text ====
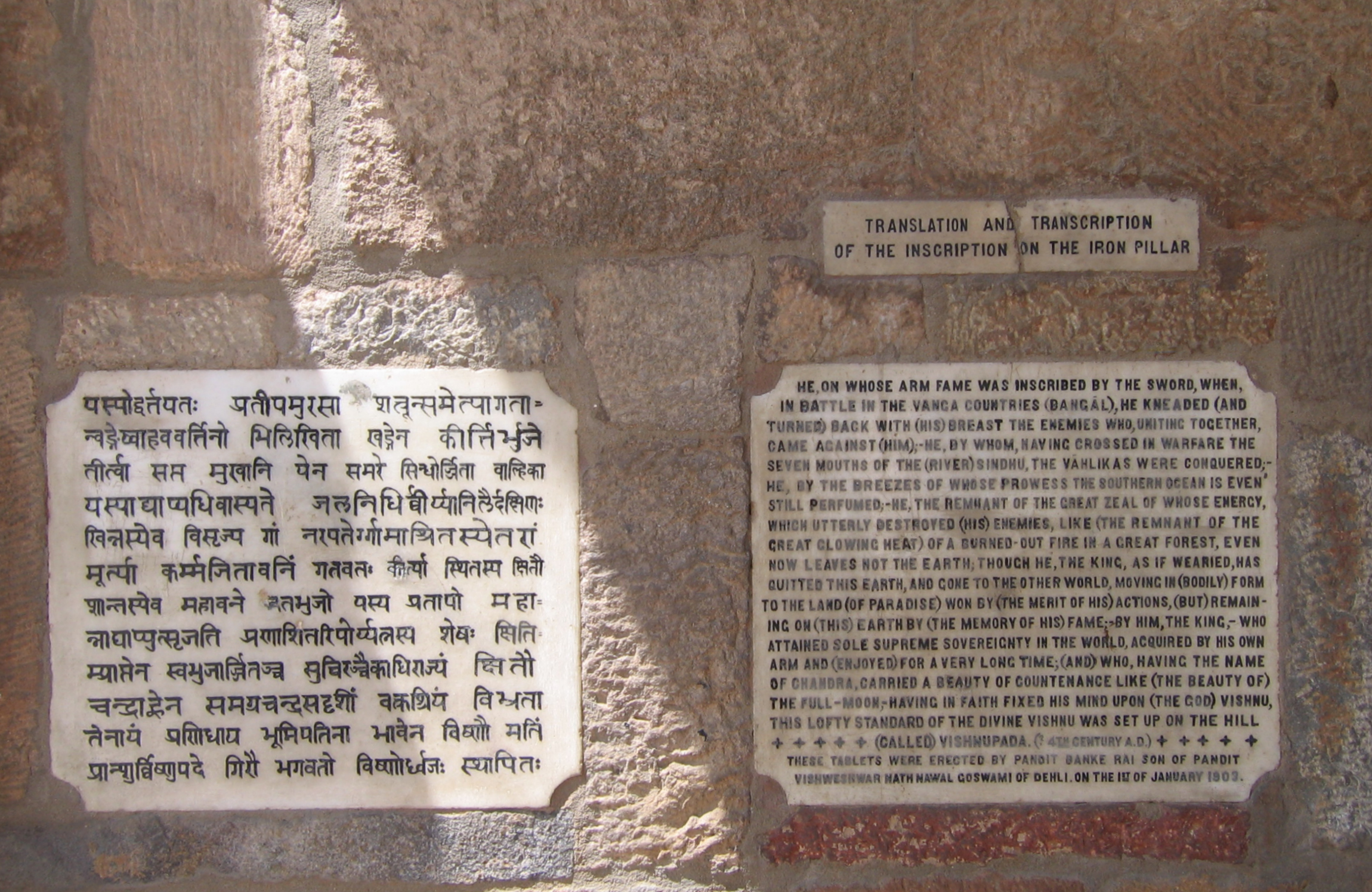
Bankelal's 1903 tablets

Following is the Roman script transliteration of the text:

Yasy odvarttayah-pratīpamurasā śattrun sametyāgatan Vańgeshvāhava varttinosbhilikhitā khadgena kīrttir bhuje
Tirtvā sapta mukhāni yena samare sindhor jjitā Vāhlikāyasyādya pyadhivāsyate jalanidhir vviryyānilair ddakshinah
Khinnasy eva visrijya gām narapater ggāmāśritasyaetrām mūr(t)yā karmma-jitāvanim gatavatah kīrt(t)yā sthitasyakshitau
Śāntasyeva mahāvane hutabhujo yasya pratāpo mahānnadhayā pyutsrijati pranāśista-ripor Yyatnasya śesahkshitim
Prāptena sva bhuj ārjitan cha suchiran ch aikādhirājayam kshitau chandrāhvena samagra chandra sadriśīm vaktra-śriyam bibhratā
Tenāyam pranidhāya bhūmipatinā bhāveva vishno (shnau) matim prānśurvisnupade girau bhagavato Vishnuordhidhvajah sthāpitah

J. F. Fleet's 1888 translation is as follows:

(Verse 1) He, on whose arm fame was inscribed by the sword, when, in battle in the Vanga countries (Bengal), he kneaded (and turned) back with (his) breast the enemies who, uniting together, came against (him); – he, by whom, having crossed in warfare the seven mouths of the (river) Sindhu, the Vahlikas were conquered; – he, by the breezes of whose prowess the southern ocean is even still perfumed; –
(Verse 2) He, the remnant of the great zeal of whose energy, which utterly destroyed (his) enemies, like (the remnant of the great glowing heat) of a burned-out fire in a great forest, even now leaves not the earth; though he, the king, as if wearied, has quit this earth, and has gone to the other world, moving in (bodily) form to the land (of paradise) won by (the merit of his) actions, (but) remaining on (this) earth by (the memory of his) fame; –
(Verse 3) By him, the king, attained sole supreme sovereignty in the world, acquired by his own arm and (enjoyed) for a very long time; (and) who, having the name of Chandra, carried a beauty of countenance like (the beauty of) the full-moon,-having in faith fixed his mind upon (the god) Vishnu, this lofty standard of the divine Vishnu was set up on the hill (called) Vishnupada.

Due to the tablets installed on the building in 1903 by Pandit Banke Rai, the reading provided by him enjoys wide currency. However, Bankelal's reading and interpretation have been challenged by more recent scholarship. The inscription has been revisited by Michael Willis in his book Archaeology of Hindu Ritual, his special concern being the nature of the king's spiritual identity after death. His reading and translation of verse 2 is as follows:

[khi]nnasyeva visṛjya gāṃ narapater ggām āśritasyetarāṃ mūrtyā karrmajitāvaniṃ gatavataḥ kīrtyā sthitasya kṣitau [*|]
śāntasyeva mahāvane hutabhujo yasya pratāpo mahān nādyāpy utsṛjati praṇāśitaripor yyatnasya śeṣaḥ kṣitim [||*]

The Sanskrit portion given above can be translated as follows:

The residue of the king's effort – a burning splendour which utterly destroyed his enemies – leaves not the earth even now, just like (the residual heat of) a burned-out conflagration in a great forest.
He, as if wearied, has abandoned this world, and resorted in actual form to the other world – a place won by the merit of his deeds – (and although) he has departed, he remains on earth through (the memory of his) fame (kīrti).

Willis concludes:

Candragupta may have passed away but the legacy of his achievement is so great that he seems to remain on earth by virtue of his fame. Emphasis is placed on Candragupta's conquest of enemies and the merit of his deeds, ideas which are also found in coin legends: kṣitim avajitya sucaritair divaṃ jayati vikramādityaḥ, i.e. "Having conquered the earth with good conduct, Vikramāditya conquered heaven". The king's conquest of heaven combined with the description of him resorting to the other world in bodily form (gām āśritasyetarāṃ mūrtyā), confirms our understanding of the worthy dead as autonomous theomorphic entities.

=== Samvat 1109 inscription ===
One short inscription on the pillar is associated with the Tomara king Anangpal, although it is hard to decipher. Alexander Cunningham (1862–63) read the inscription as follows:

Samvat Dihali 1109 Ang Pāl bahi
Translation:In Samvat 1109 [1052 CE], Ang [Anang] Pāl peopled Dilli

Based on this reading, Cunningham theorized that Anangpal had moved the pillar to its current location while establishing the city of Delhi. However, his reading has been contested by the later scholars. Buddha Rashmi Mani (1997) read it as follows:

Samvat Kinllī 1109 Aṅgapāla bādi
Translation: Anangpal tightened the nail [iron pillar] in Samvat 1109

=== History of the Iron Pillar ===
The pillar was installed as a trophy in building the Quwwat-ul-Islam mosque and the Qutb complex by Sultan Iltutmish in the 13th century. Its original location, whether on the site itself or from elsewhere, is debated.

According to the inscription of king Chandra, the pillar was erected at Vishnupadagiri (Vishnupada). J. F. Fleet (1898) identified this place with Mathura, because of its proximity to Delhi (the find spot of the inscription) and the city's reputation as a Vaishnavite pilgrimage centre. However, archaeological evidence indicates that during the Gupta period, Mathura was a major centre of Buddhism, although Vaishnavism may have existed there. Moreover, Mathura lies in plains, and only contains some small hillocks and mounds: there is no true giri (hill) in Mathura.

Based on paleographic similarity to the dated inscriptions from Udayagiri, the Gupta-era iconography, analysis of metallurgy and other evidence, Meera Dass and R. Balasubramaniam (2004) theorized that the iron pillar was originally erected at Udayagiri. According to them, the pillar, with a wheel or discus at the top, was originally located at the Udayagiri Caves. This conclusion was partly based on the fact that the inscription mentions Vishnupada-giri (IAST: Viṣṇupadagiri, meaning "hill with footprint of Viṣṇu"). This conclusion was endorsed and elaborated by Michael D. Willis in his The Archaeology of Hindu Ritual, published in 2009.

The key point in favour of placing the iron pillar at Udayagiri is that this site was closely associated with Chandragupta and the worship of Vishnu in the Gupta period. In addition, there are well-established traditions of mining and working iron in central India, documented particularly by the iron pillar at Dhar and local place names like Lohapura and Lohangī Pīr (see Vidisha). The king of Delhi, Iltutmish, is known to have attacked and sacked Vidisha in the thirteenth century and this would have given him an opportunity to remove the pillar as a trophy to Delhi, just as the Tughluq rulers brought Asokan pillars to Delhi in the 1300s.

It is not certain when the pillar was moved to Delhi from its original location. Alexander Cunningham attributed the relocation to the Tomara king Anangpal, based on the short pillar inscription ascribed to this king. Pasanaha Chariu, an 1132 CE Jain Apabhramsha text composed by Vibudh Shridhar, states that "the weight of his pillar caused the Lord of the Snakes to tremble". The identification of this pillar with the iron pillar lends support to the theory that the pillar was already in Delhi during Anangpal's reign.

Another theory is that the relocation happened during the Muslim rule in Delhi. Some scholars have assumed that it happened around 1200 CE, when Qutb al-Din Aibak commenced the construction of the Qutb complex as a general of Muhammad of Ghor.

Finbarr Barry Flood (2009) theorizes that it was Qutb al-Din's successor Iltutmish (r. 1210–1236 CE), who moved the pillar to Delhi. According to this theory, the pillar was originally erected in Vidisha and that the pillar was moved to the Qutb complex, by Iltutmish when he attacked and sacked Vidisha in the thirteenth century.

== Scientific analysis ==
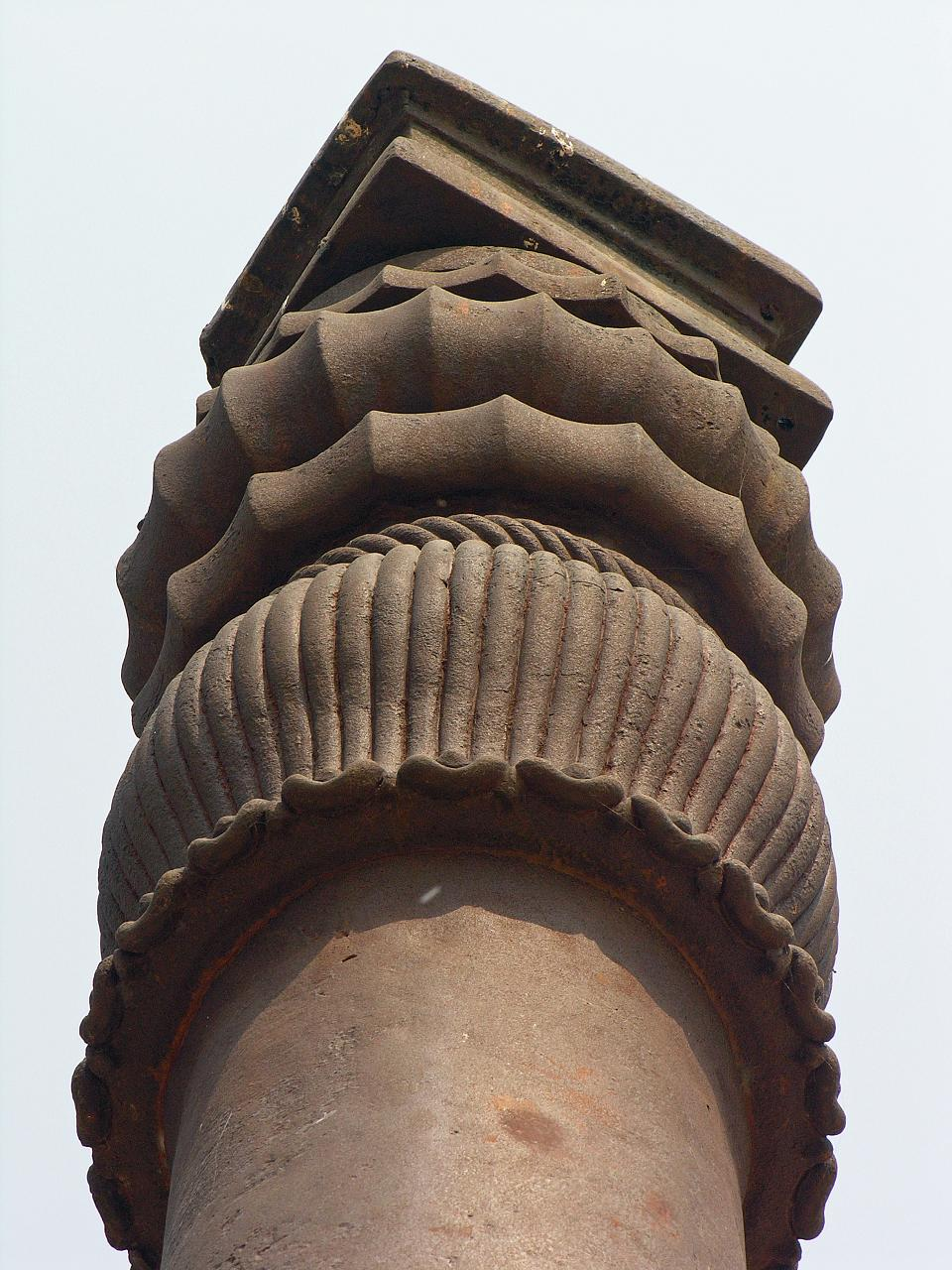
Details of the top of iron pillar, Qutb Minar, Delhi

The pillar was produced by the forge welding of pieces of wrought iron. In a report published in the journal Current Science, R. Balasubramaniam of IIT Kanpur explains how the pillar's resistance to corrosion is due to a passive protective film at the iron-rust interface. The presence of second-phase particles (slag and unreduced iron oxides) in the microstructure of the iron, that of high amounts of phosphorus in the metal, and the alternate wetting and drying existing under atmospheric conditions are the three main factors in the three-stage formation of that protective passive film.

Lepidocrocite and goethite are the first amorphous iron oxyhydroxides that appear upon oxidation of iron. High corrosion rates are initially observed. Then, an essential chemical reaction intervenes. Small secondary particles of slag and unreduced iron oxides in the iron microstructure alter the electrochemical behaviour and enrich the metal–scale interface with phosphorus. This indirectly promotes passivation of the iron (cessation of rusting activity).

The second-phase particles act as a cathode, and the metal itself serves as anode, for a mini-galvanic corrosion reaction during environment exposure. Part of the initial iron oxyhydroxides is also transformed into magnetite, which somewhat slows down the process of corrosion. The ongoing reduction of lepidocrocite and the diffusion of oxygen and complementary corrosion through the cracks and pores in the rust still contribute to the corrosion mechanism from atmospheric conditions.

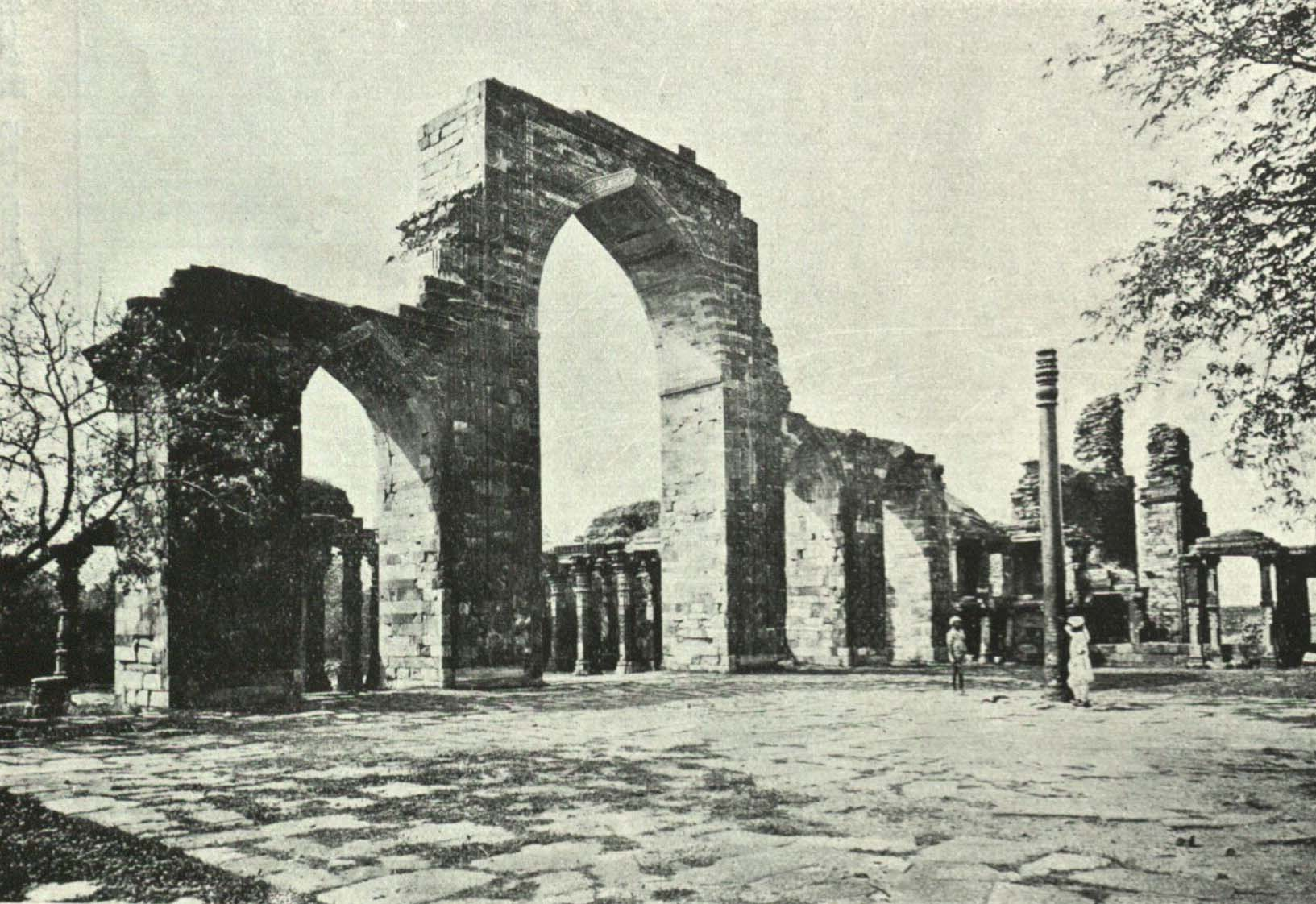
The iron pillar in Qutb Minar, c. 1905

The next main agent to intervene in protection from oxidation is phosphorus, which, like the chemical reaction described above, acts at the metal–scale interface. Phosphorus is enriched there by the same interaction between the slags and the metal. The ancient Indian smiths did not add lime to their furnaces. In modern blast furnaces, the use of limestone yields pig iron that is later converted into steel; in this process, most phosphorus is carried away by the slag.

The absence of lime in the slag and the use of specific quantities of wood with high phosphorus content (for example, Cassia auriculata) during the smelting induces a higher phosphorus content (> 0.1%, average 0.25%) than in modern iron produced in blast furnaces (usually less than 0.05%). This high phosphorus content and particular repartition are essential catalysts in the formation of a passive protective film of misawite (d-FeOOH), an amorphous iron oxyhydroxide that forms a barrier by adhering next to the interface between metal and rust. Misawite, the initial corrosion-resistance agent, was thus named because of the pioneering studies of Misawa and co-workers on the effects of phosphorus and copper and those of alternating atmospheric conditions in rust formation.

The most critical corrosion-resistance agent is iron hydrogen phosphate hydrate (FePO_{4}-H_{3}PO_{4}-4H_{2}O) under its crystalline form and building up as a thin layer next to the interface between metal and rust. Rust initially contains iron oxide/oxyhydroxides in their amorphous forms. Due to the initial corrosion of metal, there is more phosphorus at the metal–scale interface than in the bulk of the metal. Alternate environmental wetting and drying cycles provide the moisture for phosphoric-acid formation. Over time, the amorphous phosphate is precipitated into its crystalline form (the latter being therefore an indicator of old age, as this precipitation is a rather slow happening). The crystalline phosphate eventually forms a continuous layer next to the metal, which results in an excellent corrosion resistance layer. In 1,600 years, the film has grown just one-twentieth of a millimetre thick.

In 1969, in his first book, Chariots of the Gods?, Erich von Däniken cited the absence of corrosion on the Delhi pillar and the unknown nature of its creation as evidence of extraterrestrial visitation. When informed by an interviewer, in 1974, that the column was not in fact rust-free, and that its method of construction was well-understood, von Däniken responded that he no longer considered the pillar or its creation to be a mystery. Balasubramaniam states that the pillar is "a living testimony to the skill of metallurgists of ancient India". An interview with Balasubramaniam and his work can be seen in the 2005 article by the writer and editor Matthew Veazey. Further research published in 2009 showed that corrosion has developed evenly over the surface of the pillar.

It was claimed in the 1920s that iron manufactured in Mirjati near Jamshedpur is similar to the iron of the Delhi pillar. Further work on Adivasi (tribal) iron by the National Metallurgical Laboratory in the 1960s did not verify this claim.

== Evidence of a cannonball strike ==
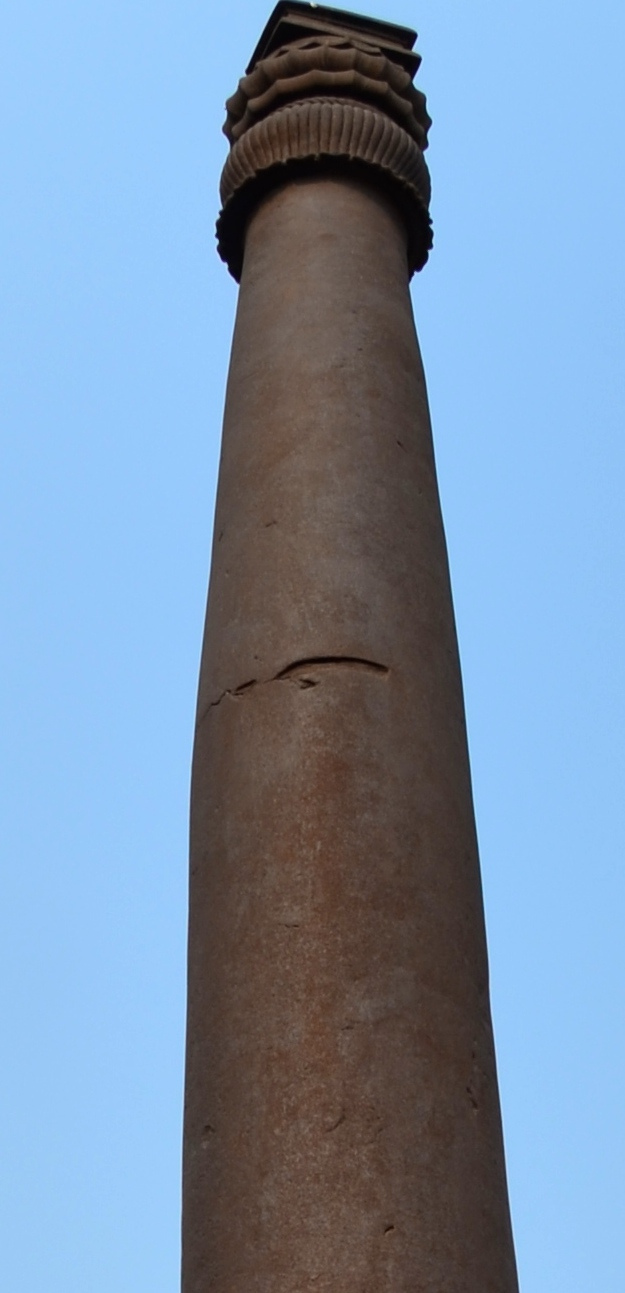
Upper half of pillar, demonstrating horizontal fissuring thought to be caused by cannonball strike

A significant indentation on the middle section of the pillar, approximately 4 m (13 ft) from the current courtyard ground level, has been shown to be the result of a cannonball fired at close range. The impact caused horizontal fissuring of the column in the area diametrically opposite to the indentation site, but the column itself remained intact. While no contemporaneous records, inscriptions, or documents describing the event are known to exist, historians generally agree that Nadir Shah is likely to have ordered the pillar's destruction during his invasion of Delhi in 1739, as he would have considered a Hindu temple monument undesirable within an Islamic mosque complex. Alternatively, he may have sought to dislodge the decorative top portion of the pillar in search of hidden precious stones or other items of value.

No additional damage attributable to cannon fire has been found on the pillar, suggesting that no further shots were taken. Historians have speculated that ricocheting fragments of the cannonball may have damaged the nearby Quwwat-ul-Islam mosque, which suffered damage to its southwestern portion during the same period, and the assault on the pillar might have been abandoned as a result.

== See also ==
- Related topics
  - Ancient iron production
  - History of metallurgy in South Asia
  - Parkerizing
  - Serpent Column
  - Wootz steel
- Other pillars of India
  - Ashoka's Major Rock Edicts
  - Dhar iron pillar
  - List of Edicts of Ashoka
  - Pillars of Ashoka
  - Heliodorus pillar
  - Stambha
- Other similar topics
  - Early Indian epigraphy
  - Hindu temple architecture
  - History of India
  - Indian copper plate inscriptions
  - Indian rock-cut architecture
  - List of rock-cut temples in India
  - Outline of ancient India
  - South Indian Inscriptions
  - Tagundaing
