= Rawe (clan) =

Subcaste of Rajputs

A group of the Indian Rajput clan, Rawa Rajputs are categorized high caste rajputs as its members claim descendancy from different ancestors and dynasties.

The Rawa Rajput (also spelled Rawa, Rave, Raye, Raya Rajput) is a subcaste of the Rajputs, primarily found in the Indian states of Delhi and Western Uttar Pradesh. They are believed to be descendants of eminent rulers from aristocratic Rajput clans, with a lineage rooted in the valor and traditions of North Indian warrior dynasties.

== Historical background ==
The Rawe Rajputs are believed to have held prominent zamindari (landholding) and chieftainship roles during the medieval and early colonial periods.

Rawa comes from RAjput WAhimi Dal, so it became Rawa or you can say Rawad or Ravad Rajputs.

These Soldier's characterize as special Rajput Soldier's in Rajputs army, they defeated mainly Arabs and drove out them from India that's why Arabs never conquered and failed to establish Muslim Caliphate in India, they also defeated Turks

They had close ties with Tomar Rajputs and Chauhan Rajputs of Delhi.

Their ancestral settlements date back to the Delhi Sultanate and Mughal Empire eras, when various Rajput clans negotiated or resisted imperial powers for territorial autonomy.

The presence of Rawa Rajputs in parts of western UP & Delhi along with military in Meerut Cantt boosted the 1857 freedom struggle in siege of Delhi as it was a mixed attack

== Geographic distribution ==
The Rawe Rajput community is currently distributed across approximately 150 villages in the National Capital Region (NCR), particularly in central and western Uttar Pradesh.

=== Village clusters of Rawa Rajputs ===
==== Saitwada (सत्ताईसवाड़ा / Sattaiswada) – “The Twenty-Seven Villages” ====
The term Saitwada refers to a cluster of 27 villages around Khatauli in the Muzaffarnagar district of Uttar Pradesh. These villages form a traditional socio-cultural unit among the Rawa Rajputs and maintain strong inter-community ties through marriage and customs. Prominent villages include:

- Sathedi
- Sardhana
- Doodhli
- Lahodda
- Tingai
- Mubarikpur
- Rukanpur
- Khedi
- Bhangi
- Bhangela
- Sikandarpur
- Ladpur
- Yahiyapur
- Gangdhadi
- Lisoda
- Chindoda
- Ahmadgarh
- Khatauli
- Jansath
- Naya Gaon
- Alipur Aterna, etc.

==== Chougama (चौगामा) – “The Four Villages” ====
Near Budhana in Muzaffarnagar, the Rawa Rajputs inhabit a group called Chougama, consisting of:

- Baroda
- Paldi
- Garhi
- Fugana

==== Satgama (सतगामा) – “The Seven Villages” ====
In Baghpat and Baraut areas of Baghpat district, the Rawa Rajputs reside in seven villages referred to as Satgama:

- Teda
- Taraoda
- Nangla Rawa
- Titroda
- Fadalpur
- Tatiri,
- Gwalikhera, etc.

==== Other villages and settlements ====
Additional Rawa Rajput settlements include:

- Kayampur
- Sujra
- Gathina
- Badka
- Badkata
- Fajualapur
- Bamnauli
- Pois
- Dhodra
- Tyodhi
- Bam
- Dahar
- Panchli, etc.

==== Rawa Rajputs in Delhi ====
The Rawa Rajput community is also well established in several areas of Delhi, especially in the western region. Major villages include:

- Naraina
- Titarpur
- Khampur
- Basai Darapur
- Nangal Rawa
- Wazirpur

Other notable areas include Subzi Mandi, Sagarpur, and nearby localities in West Delhi.

==== Presence in Bijnor ====
The Rawa Rajputs are also reported to inhabit 84 villages in the Bijnor district of western Uttar Pradesh, further solidifying their cultural and demographic footprint in the region.

These areas have transitioned from agricultural hubs to urban settlements, with members of the community now employed in government service, politics, and business.

== Culture and social practices ==
The Rawa Rajputs are known for their progressive yet traditional values:

They were among the early Rajput groups to support widow remarriage, reflecting their liberal stance on social reform.

Most Rawa Rajputs are vegetarian, abstain from alcohol, and do not wear the janeu (sacred thread), differentiating them from orthodox Brahminical customs.

As a royal tradition, they do not cut their hair upon the death of a family member, unlike some Hindu mourning rituals.

=== Occupation and land ownership ===
Historically engaged in agriculture, many Rawa Rajputs held large tracts of land, especially in Delhi, much of which was acquired by the Government of India post-1947.

Though primarily agrarian, modern Rawa Rajputs are now active in politics, government services, and business.

=== Language and Dialect ===
Rawa Rajputs in Delhi and western UP predominantly speak Khari Boli, a dialect of Hindi that is now recognized as standard Hindi.

In contrast, surrounding communities may speak Punjabi, Haryanvi, Rajasthani, or local dialects.

=== Marriage and identity ===
Rawa Rajputs traditionally married within their own sub-group to maintain cultural purity, especially as they remained entirely Hindu during the periods of forced conversions between 1000–1800 AD.

=== Community structure ===
In most Rawa Rajput villages, they are the dominant caste, often acting as yajmans (patrons) to traditional occupational castes such as:

Brahmins (priests)

Barbers

Carpenters

Potters

Sweepers

Washermen

Tailors

=== Historical legacy ===
The legendary Anangpal Tomar, considered a Rawa Rajput king, ruled Delhi before Prithvi Raj Chauhan. He is credited with forming a strong native army that included many Rajput clans.

Though lacking conclusive historical proof, oral tradition holds that six Rajput clans (Tanwar, Panwar, Yadu, Kushwaha, Chauhan, and Gahlot) are integral to the Rawa Rajput identity.

=== Etymology and titles ===
The word Rawa (or Rava) may derive from RAjput WAhimi Dal, indicating a select martial division within Rajput ranks.

Surnames used include:

Pathrayan, Rajput, Kumar, Singh, Verma, Chauhan, Suryavanshi, Thakur, Grade, Mogha, Manav, Suryan

Gotra-based names are also used. Gotra details

Notably, ancient Rajputs, like Lord Ram, Lord Krishna, and Pandavas, did not use surnames — a tradition Rawa Rajputs often reference to stress their high status.

== Notable personalities ==
- Anil Mogha
- Sunidhi Chauhan
- Neha Tanwar
- Gajendra Chauhan
- Pradyumn Rajput
- Karan Singh Tanwar Indian (Politician) from Delhi.
- Mukesh Kumar Tanwar - Indian (Politician) from Delhi. Served as General Secretary to BJP Delhi(Kisan Morcha). Currently hon'ble member of ZRUCC, Northern Railway, Govt of India
- Master Omilal Singh – From Baroda, Rashtriya Sangrakshak (Bhartiya Kisan Majdoor Sangathan), Rashtriya Mahamantri (Bhartya Rashtriya Rawa Rajput Mahasabha)
- Sukhbir Singh Gathina, Rashtriya Mahasachiv RLD, Rashtriya Adhyaksh (Bhartya
- Satish Chauhan, Former Deputy Secretary (Delhi Govt), Rashtriya Sanyojak (Bhartya Rashtriya Rawa Rajput Mahasabha).
- Harshit from Wazirpur Village, Delhi
