= Harshita =

Harshitha
- Pronunciation: harsh+e(इ)+tha
- Gender: Female
- Language: Hindi; Sanskrit

Origin
- Origin: Hindu
- Meaning: "full of happiness and joy "
- Region of origin: India

Other names
- Alternative spelling: Harshita
- Nicknames: sita, ishu, harshi, harshu, harsha, harshuru, harshamma, ishi, rishi,
- Derived: happiness, joy, calm, cheerful
- Related names: Harshita, harshika, harshini

Harshita (Hindi : हर्षिता) is a Hindu/Sanskrit Indian feminine given name, which means "full of happiness". The name is traditionally associated with pureness of heart and soul, and honesty. Notable people with the name include:

- Harshita Gaur (born 1990), Indian actress
- Harshita Ojha, Indian actress
- Harshita Saxena (fl. 2007–2010), pageant contestant
- Harshita Tomar (born 2002), Indian sailor
- Harshita Goyal, second highest scorer in UPSC 2024

== See also ==
- Harshit
- Harshitha
