= Harshit =

Harshit is an Indian masculine given name. Notable people with the name include:

- Harshit Shatrughan Bisht (born 1999), Indian cricketer
- Harshit Rana (born 2001), Indian cricketer
- Harshit Rathod, (born 1998), Indian cricketer
- Harshit Saini (born 1997), Indian cricketer
- Harshit Saxena (born 1985), Indian singer and composer

== In media ==
- Harshit (film)

== See also ==
- Harshita
