= Sahu Todar =

Sahu Todar, was a supervisor of the royal mint at Agra during the rule of Mughal Emperor Akbar.

With his patronage, Pande Rajamalla had composed Jambuswami Charitra in 1575.

His son Sahu Rishabhadas was also a patron of scholarship. Pandit Nayavilasa had written a commentary on Shubhachandra's Jnanarnava.
