= Avreya =

Avreya (Russian: Авре́я) is an old and uncommon Russian female first name. It derives from the Latin word aurea, meaning golden.

The diminutives of "Avreya" are Ava (А́ва) and Reya (Ре́я).
