= Vibudh Shridhar =

Indian writer

Vibudh Shridhar or Vibudha Shridhara (fl. 1189—1230) was an accomplished Apabhraṃśa writer and poet in North India. He is the first known Agrawal Jain author. His Pasanaha Chariu provides the first reference to the Jain community and the first historical reference to the legend of the origin of the name Dhilli for Delhi.

== Claims ==
हरियाणए देसे असंखगाम, गामियण जणि अणवरथ काम|
परचक्क विहट्टणु सिरिसंघट्टणु, जो सुरव इणा परिगणियं|
रिउ रुहिरावट्टणु बिउलु पवट्टणु, ढिल्ली नामेण जि भणियं|

Translation: There are countless villages in Haryana country. The villagers there work hard. They don't accept domination of others, and are experts in making the blood of their enemies flow. Indra himself praises this country. The capital of this country is Dhilli.

जहिं असिवर तोडिय रिउ कवालु, णरणाहु पसिद्धउ अणंगवालु ||
वलभर कम्पाविउ णायरायु, माणिणियण मणसंजनीय ||

The ruler Anangapal is famous, he can slay his enemies with his sword. The weight (of the Iron pillar) caused the Nagaraj to shake.

Four of his books have been found in Jain libraries,

- Pasanaha Chariu (Parshvanatha Charit) (VS 1189)
- Vaddhamana Chariu (Vardhamana Charit) (VS 1190)
- Sukumala Chariu (Sukumala Charit)(VS 1208)
- Bhavisayatta Kahaa (Bhavishyadatta Katha)(VS 1230)

His earlier books Chandappaha Chariu (Chandraprabha Charit) and Santijenesara Chariu have not yet been found. All his works are in Apabhramsha with some verses in Sanskrit. His parents were Golha and Vilha living in Haryana region. According to Pasanaha Chariu, he arrived in Delhi after having composed Chandappaha Chariu. In the court of Tomara king Anangpal Tomar, he recited his Chandappaha Chariu. In the court, a local person Alhana Sahu suggested him to see Nattal Sahu, the third son of Jeja Sahu, and an Agrawal Jain merchant.

Vibudh Shridhar expressed his humility and expressed hesitation in approaching Nattala Sahu. Alhana Sahu responded "Don't you know Nattala? He is always willing to help noble people. He organizes meetings of scholars and studies the sacred texts? He never declines what I ask him. Go and meet him." Vibudh Shridhar met Nattala Sahu, and with his support composed Pasanaha Chariu in VS 1189.

In 1190 he wrote Vaddhamana Chariu with the support of Nemichandra of the Jayasa (Jaiswal Jain) clan living at Vodauva (Badaun, UP). He writes:

भो वीवा कंत मणोहिराम, सुणु णेमिचंद पायडिय नाम

Listen, O Namichand, who is the beloved of Viva (his wife)

इह जम्बूदीवइ देवराइ, परिभिमिर मिहिर णक्खत्त राइ
सुरगिरि दाहिण दिसि भरहखेत्त, बहु वीहि विहुसिय विविहखेत्त

Noblest of the islands is the Jambudvipa, circumambulate by the sun and the stars,
South of the Sumeru is the Bharata country, adorned by many paddy fields..

He wrote Sukumala Chariu in VS 1208 with the support of Kumar Sahu of Puravada (Parwar or Porwada) clan in Baladai village. Bhavisayatta Kahaa was written in VS 1230 at Chandwar (near Firozabad) with the support of Supatta of Mathur clan.

== See also ==
- Nattal Sahu
- Agrawal Jain
- Jainism
