= Anangpal Tomar =

Samraat of Dhillikapuri (Delhi)

Anangpal Tomara II
- Samraat of Dhillikapuri (Delhi); Tribhuvan Pal Naresh
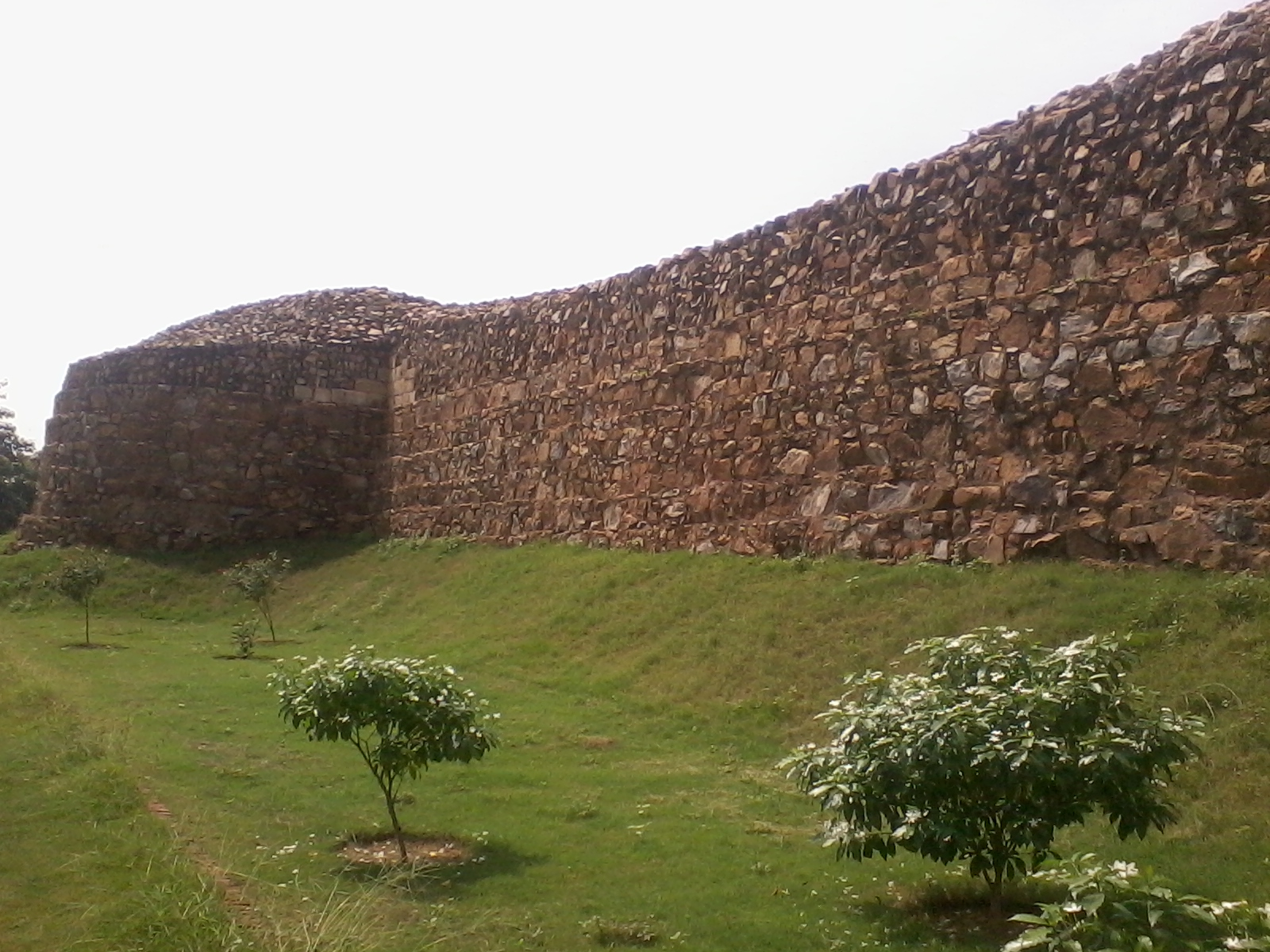
- Lal Kot, the fortress built by Anangpal II

16th Emperor of the Tomara Empire
- Reign: c.1051 – c.1081 CE
- Predecessor: Kumar Pala
- Successor: Teja Pala
- Dynasty: Tomara dynasty
- Religion: Hinduism

Anangpal II, popularly known as Anangpal Tomara, was an Indian ruler from the Tomara Rajput dynasty. He is known to have established and populated Delhi in the 11th century. He is often confused with Anangpal I, the founder of Tomara Dynasty of Delhi, who had reigned during the 8th century. He traced the lineage to Chandravanshi Kshatriya kings, namely Arjuna from the epic Mahabharata.

== Ancestry ==
According to legend Tomar were descendant of Kuru king Parikshit.

== Territory ==
The territory ruled by the Tomaras was called Hariyana (literally 'Abode of God'). This Hariyana was many folds in size compared to the current state of Haryana. The Tomar Empire during the reign of Anangpal II extended over various parts of Delhi, Haryana, Punjab, Himachal Pradesh, Uttar Pradesh, Madhya Pradesh and Rajasthan.

The capital of Tomars changed a few times during the course of 457 years they ruled in the northern India. The first capital of the Tomar empire was Anangpur while the last one was Dhillikapuri (Delhi, Lal Kot).

Other parts of the Kingdom of political importance were as follows: Pathankot - Nurpur, Patan - Tanwarawati, Nagarkot (Kangra), Asigarh (Hansi), Sthaneshwar (Thanesar), Mathura, Taragarh, Gopachal (Gwalior), Tanwarhinda (Bhatinda), Tanwarghaar.

== Founding of Delhi ==
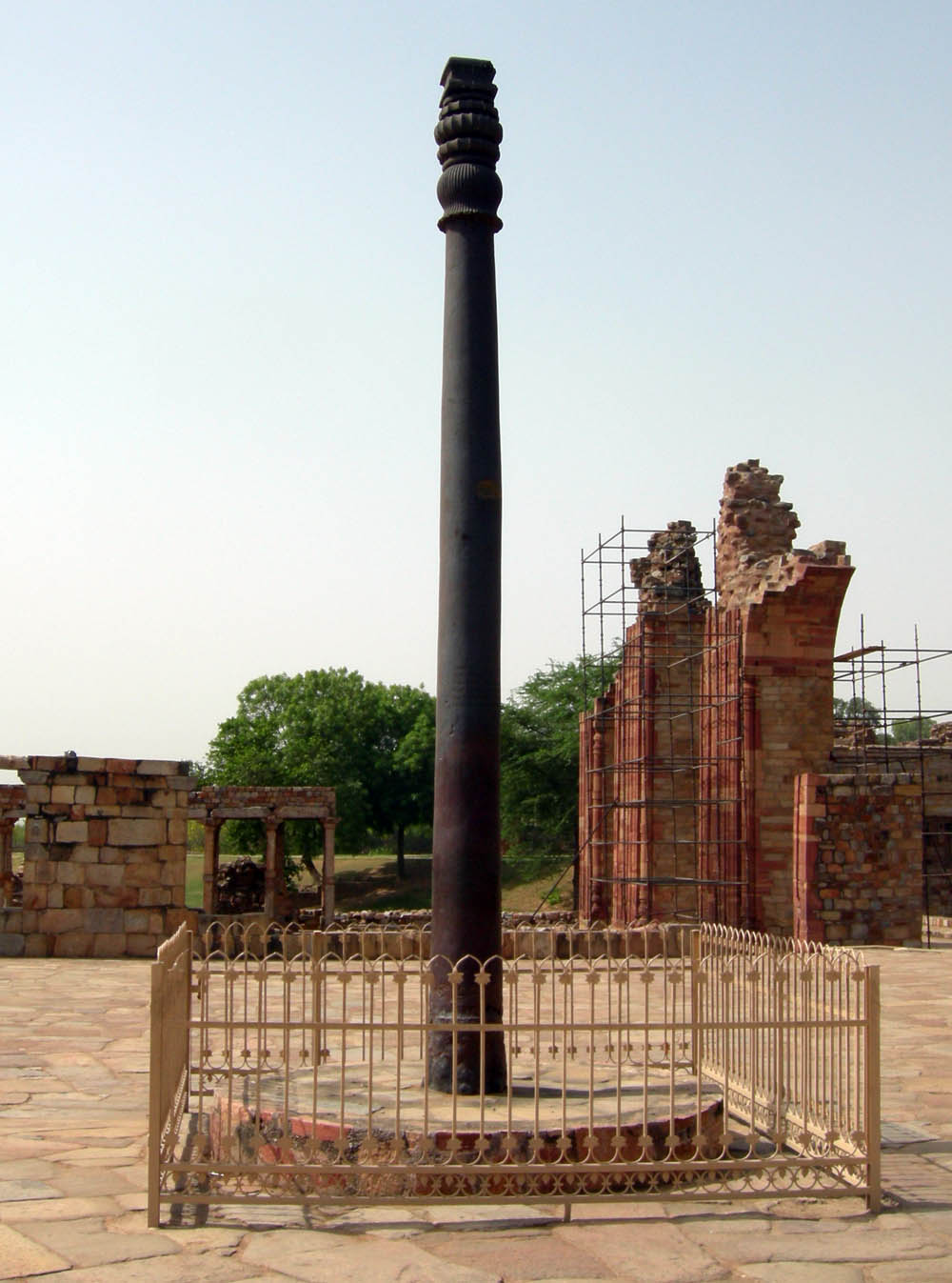
The Iron Pillar of Delhi states that Delhi by Anangpal Tomar.

Anangpal Tomar founded Delhi in 1052. A VS 1383 inscription in Delhi Museum states the founding of Delhi by the Tomars:

देशोऽस्ति हरियानाख्यो पॄथिव्यां स्वर्गसन्निभः

— ढिल्लिकाख्या पुरी तत्र तोमरैरस्ति निर्मिता

Translation: In a country called Haryana, which is equivalent to heaven on earth, Tomars built a city called Dhillika.

An inscription on the iron pillar also names the founder of Delhi as Anangpal Tomar. Alexander Cunningham read the inscription as follows:

"Samvat Dihali 1109 Ang Pāl bahi"

Translation: In Samvat 1109 [1052 CE], [Anang] Pāl peopled Dilli.

The name Delhi is said to be derived from the word 'Dhillika'. Pasanaha Chariu of Vibudh Shridhar (VS 1189–1230) an Apabhramsha writer, provides the first reference to the legend of the origin of the name Dhilli for Delhi.

हरियाणए देसे असंखगाम, गामियण जणि अणवरथ काम

— परचक्क विहट्टणु सिरिसंघट्टणु, जो सुरव इणा परिगणियं, रिउ रुहिरावट्टणु बिउलु पवट्टणु, ढिल्ली नामेण जि भणियं

Translation: There are countless villages in Haryana country. The villagers there work hard. They don't accept domination of others, and are experts in making the blood of their enemies flow. Indra himself praises this country. The capital of this country is Dhilli.

Prithviraj Raso also has the founding by the Tomars and the legend of the loose nail:

हुं गड्डि गयौ किल्ली सज्जीव हल्लाय करी ढिल्ली सईव

— फिरि व्यास कहै सुनि अनंगराइ भवितव्य बात मेटी न जाइ

Translation: Anangpal established the “Killi” (nail) in Dhilli. This tale cannot be removed from history ever.

== Military career ==
Anangpal's empire was surrounded by many powerful kingdoms but records of conflicts with only two of them is available. As per his contemporary Vibudh Shridhar's Parshwanath Charit, he defeated Turks led by Ibrahim Ghaznavi in Himachal pradesh and thereafter Kalashdev of Utpala dynasty in kashmir.

== Constructions by Anangpal II ==
=== Lal Kot ===
The Lal Kot (as the Qila Rai Pithora was originally called) is believed to be constructed in the reign of Tomar king Anangpal II. He brought the iron pillar from Saunkh in Mathura district and got it fixed in Delhi in the year 1052 as evident from the inscriptions on it. After the fixing of Iron Pillar (Killi) in delhi, coins in the name of "Shree Killi Dev Pal" were also minted by him. By assuming the iron pillar as center, numerous palaces and temples were built and finally the fort Lal Kot was built around them. The construction of the Lal Kot finished in the year 1060. The circumference of the fort was more than 2 miles and the walls of the fort were 60 feet long and 30 feet thick. Lal Kot was Delhi’s original ‘red fort’. What we call Red Fort or Lal Qila today was originally called Qila-e-Mubarak.

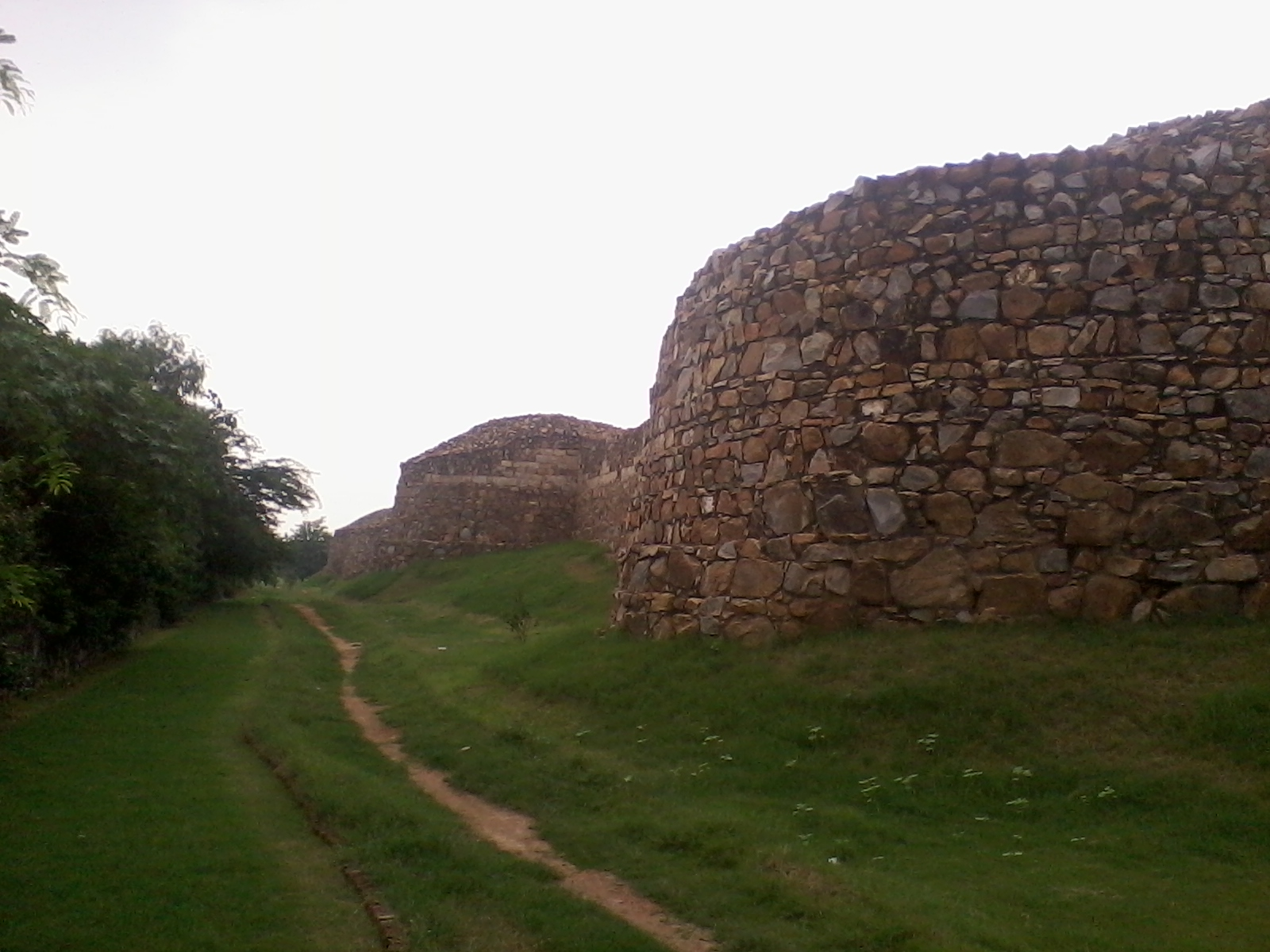
Outer wall of Lal Kot

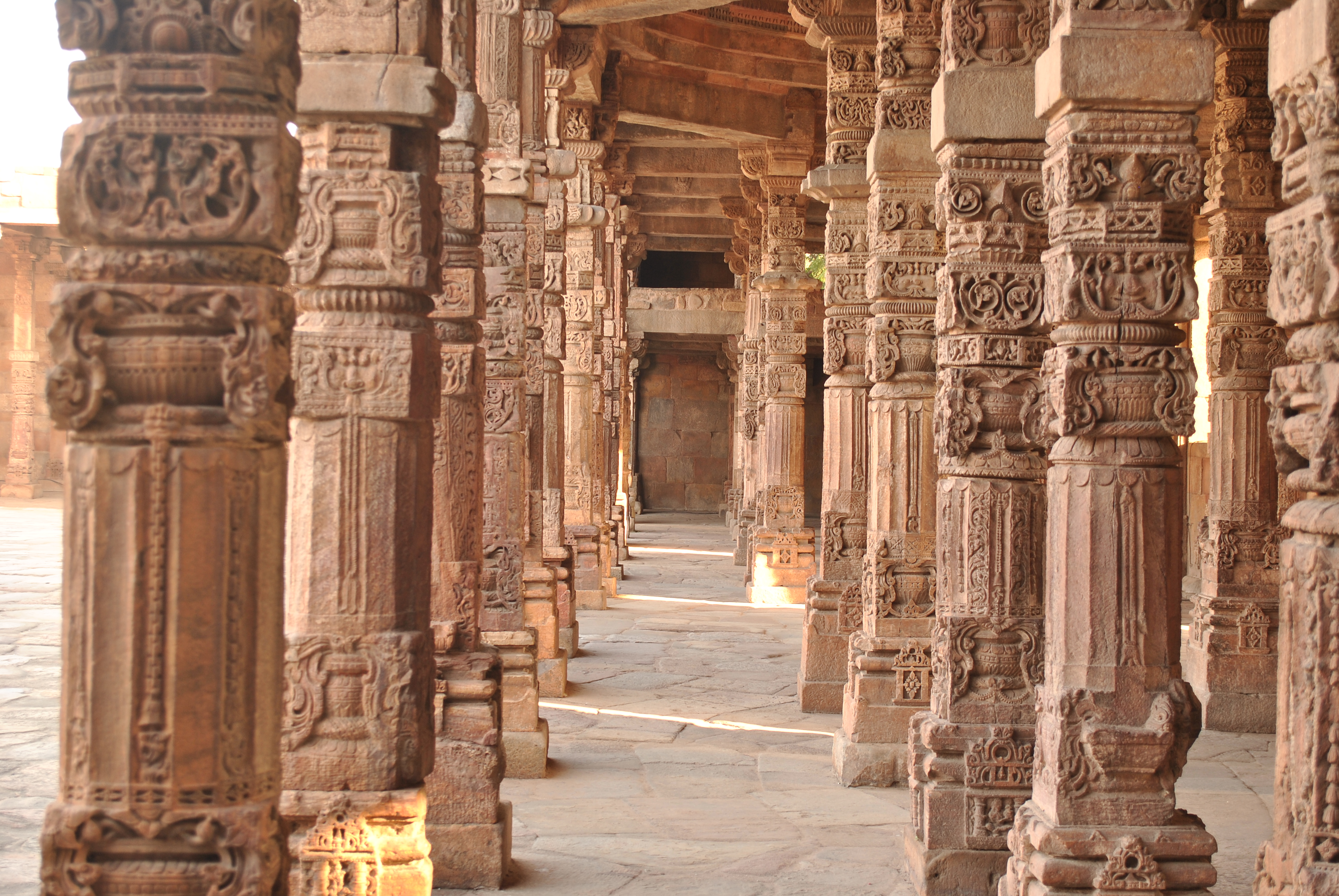
Ancient temple pillars in Qutb Minar complex

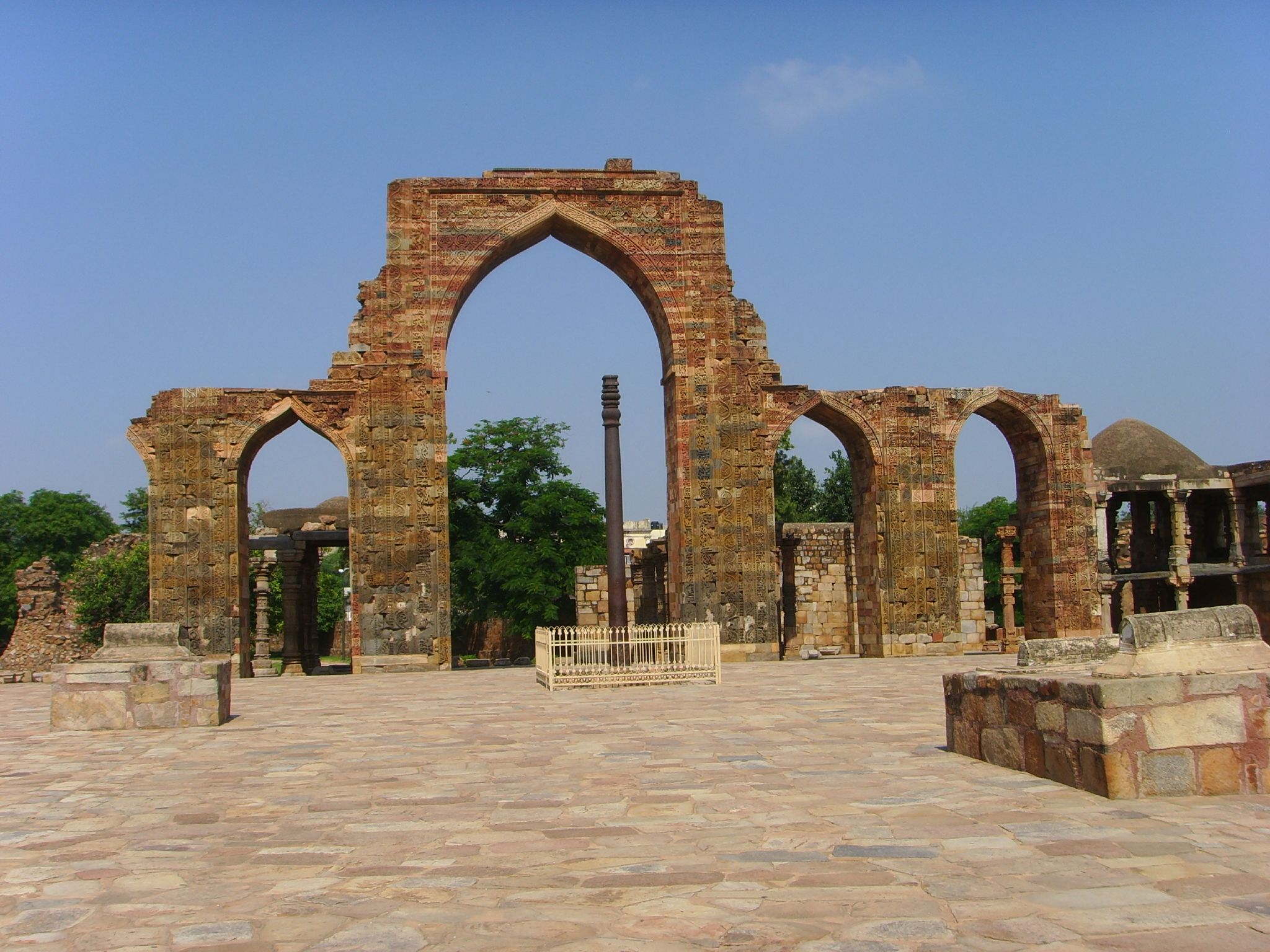
Construction around Iron Pillar

=== Asigarh ===
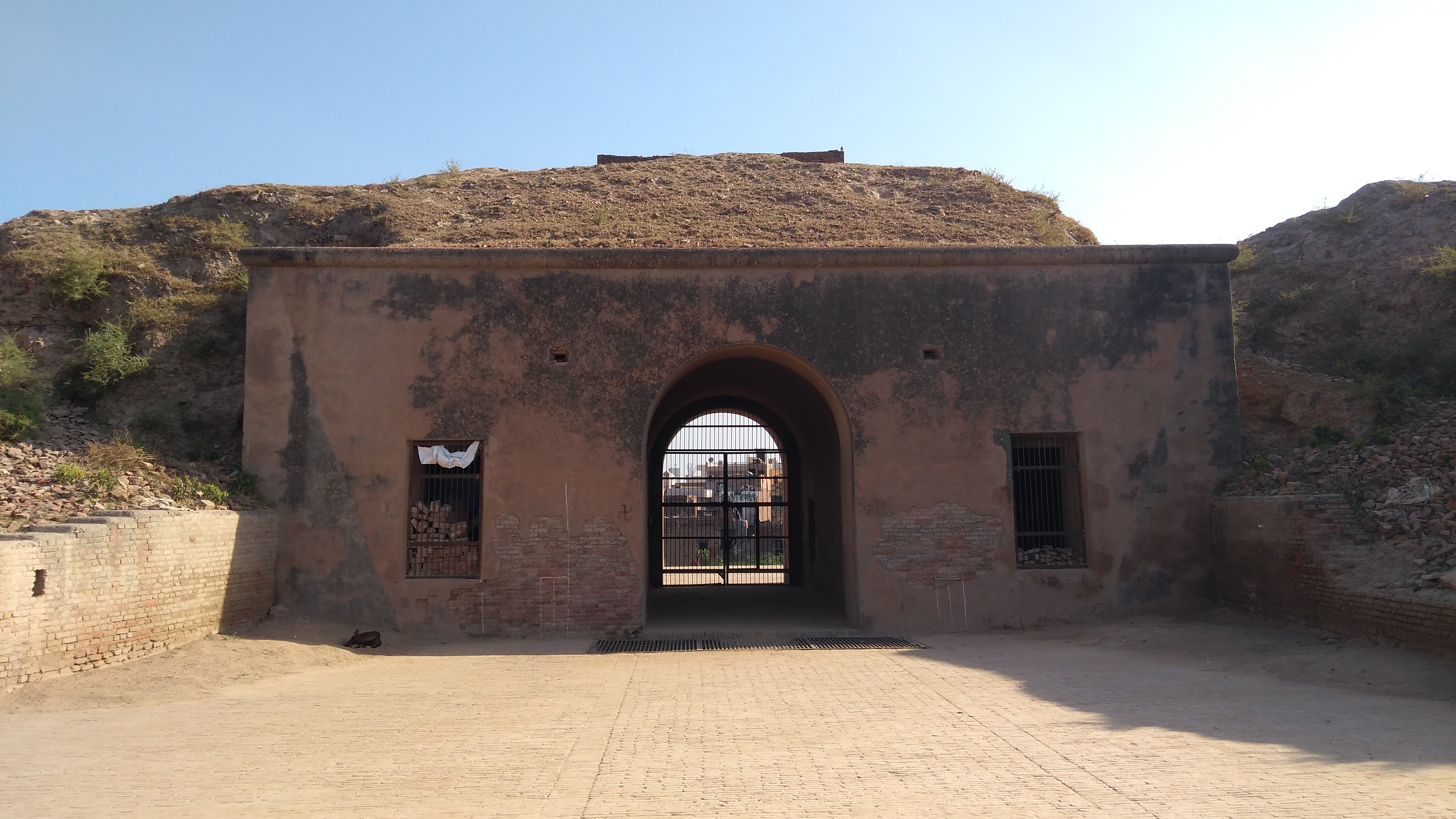
Asigarh (Hansi Fort)

It is believed that Hansi was founded by Anangpal for his guru "Hansakar". Later, his son Drupad established a sword manufacturing factory in this fort, hence it is also called "Asigarh". Swords from this fort were exported as far away as to Arab countries. As per Talif-e-Tajkara-e-Hansi by Qazi Sharif Husain in 1915, around 80 forts across the area were controlled from this centre "Asigarh".

=== Other Forts ===
He constructed the Tahangarh fort (Tribhuvangiri) in Karauli district of Rajasthan and was also referred to as "Tribhuvan Pal Naresh". He is also credited to have established the Patan fort as the capital of his Tanwarawati kingdom in Rajasthan. Apart from these, he also built the forts of Ballabhgarh, Badalgarh & Mahendragarh (Narnaul).

=== Yogmaya Temple ===
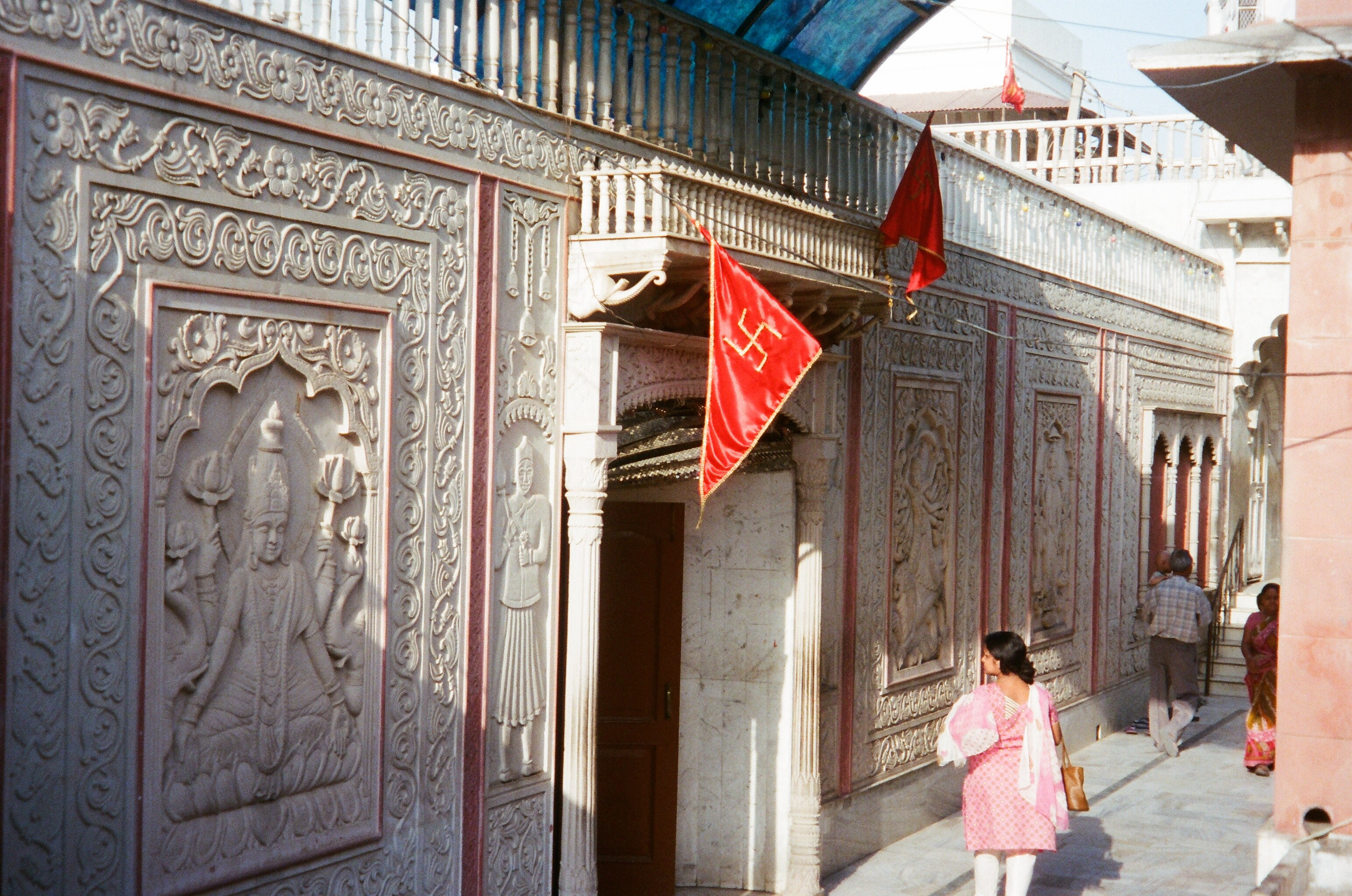
Yogmaya Temple

Yogmaya Temple was built by Anangpal Tomar 2 for worshipping the Kuldevi of Tomars, Yogmaya. The temple lies 260 yards from the Iron Pillar and within the walls of the Lal Kot fort in Mehrauli. He also built a water body (johad) adjacent to the temple known as Anangtal Baoli. This is one of those 27 temples which were destroyed by Mamluks and it is the only surviving temple belonging to pre-sultanate period which is still in use. King Hemu reconstructed the temple and brought back the temple from ruins. According to local priests and native records, the original temple is believed to be built by the Pandavas at the end of Mahabharata war. 12th-century Jain scriptures also mention Mehrauli as Yoginipura, after the temple. The temple is also an integral part of an important inter-faith festival of Delhi, the annual Phool Walon Ki Sair.

=== Anangtal Baoli ===
The Anangtal Baoli in Mehrauli which is the oldest existing primitive form of Baoli in Delhi was built by him.

=== Surajkund ===
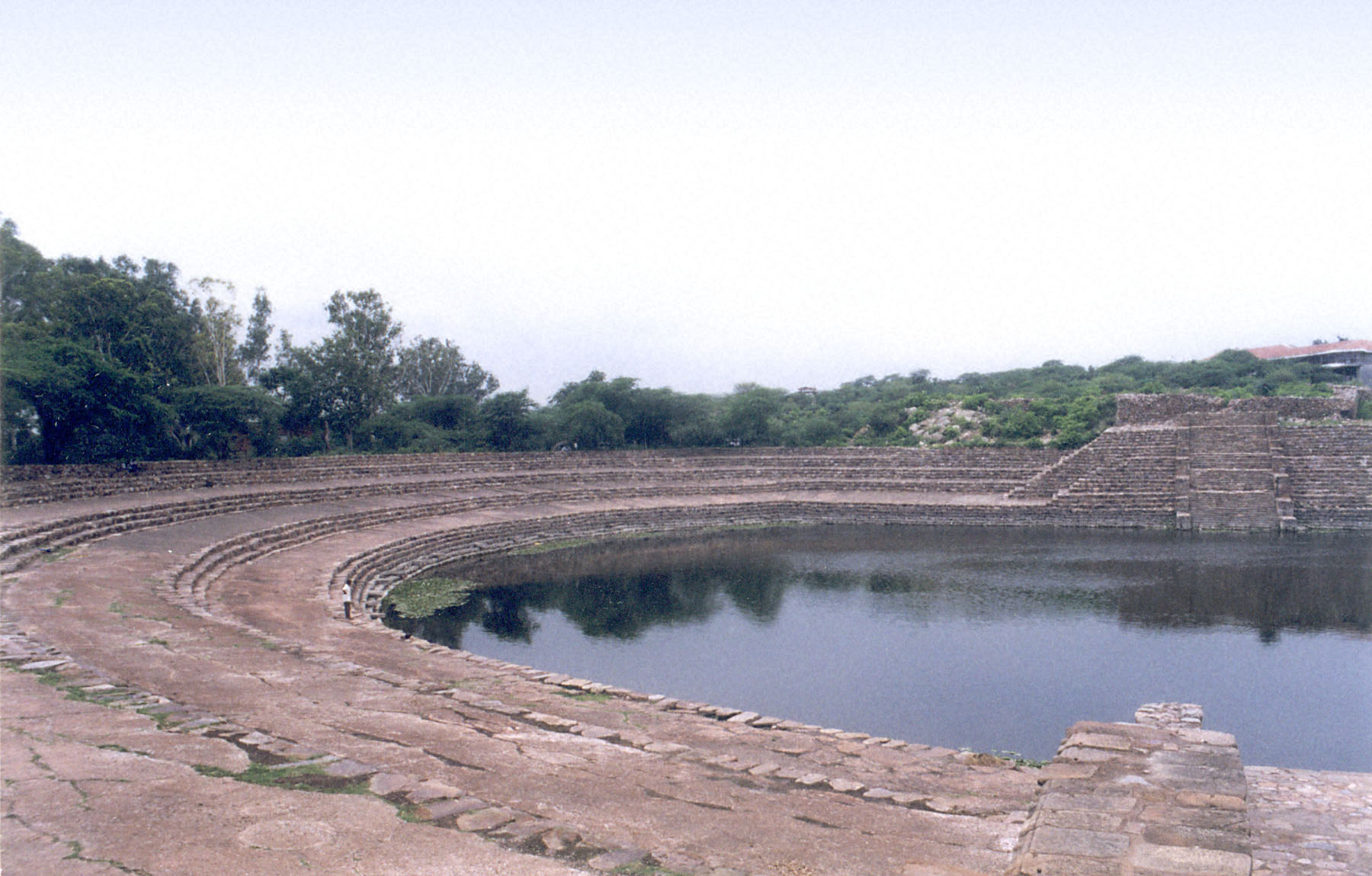
Suraj Kund

One of his son Surajpal is credited to have built the Surajkund where a yearly Mela (Fair) is held.

== Patronage to Hindi ==
Anangpal II minted coins with two types of legend verses:

1. 'श्री अनंगपाल' – a pure sanskrit version
2. 'श्री अणंगपाल' – a local Haryanvi dialect version

The use of this 'श्री अणंगपाल' is highly important. The actual Father of medieval Hindi is Anangpal ll and its birthplace is Haryana. This region was the source of languages of Tulsidas and Amir khusrau. The credit for the development of Hindi is given to Amir Khusrau but according to historian and epigraphist Harihar Niwas Dwivedi, the reality is that it was designed many centuries before him by Tomars of Delhi and it's complete refinement was done by Tomars of Gwalior.

== Legacy ==
According to farishta, in Northern India, there existed a group of almost 150 kingdoms whose rulers considered the Tomar emperors of Delhi their Chief. This group of kings is believed to have existed during the reign of Anangpal II as well. The rulers of these kingdoms only later on participated in the 1st and 2nd Battle of Tarain under the leadership of Tomar emperor Chahadpal Tomar (better known as Govind Rai) who was the cousin and commander in chief of Prithviraj Chauhan.

To quote an 18th-century oriental scholar, Anangpal Tomar was "justly entitled to be termed the paramount sovereign of Hindustan". An inscription in his praises is as follows -

जहिं असिवर तोडिय रिउ कवालु, णरणाहु पसिद्धउ अणंगवालु

— वलभर कम्पाविउ णायरायु, माणिणियण मणसंजनीय

Translation: The ruler Anangpal is famous everywhere and break skulls of his enemies. He even caused the great Sheshnaag (on which earth is stable) to shake.

The Indian government has recently formed the ‘Maharaja Anangpal II Memorial Committee’ to popularise the legacy of 11th-century Tomar Emperor Anangpal II. Its proposals include building a statue of Anangpal II at the Delhi airport and building a museum dedicated to his legacy in Delhi. An exhibition — comprising coins, inscriptions and literature — held on the sidelines of the seminar will be taken abroad through the Indian Council of Cultural Relations (ICCR) so that the narrative takes roots outside India as well. There is also a proposal to make Lal Kot an ASI-protected monument so that vertical excavation could be carried out to establish more links between Tomars and Delhi. “Anangpal II was instrumental in populating Indraprastha and giving it its present name, Delhi. The region was in ruins when he ascended the throne in the 11th century, it was he who built Lal Kot fort and Anangtal Baoli. The Tomar rule over the region is attested by multiple inscriptions and coins, and their ancestry can be traced to the Pandavas (of the Mahabharata)" said BR Mani, former joint director-general of the Archaeological Survey of India (ASI).

== See also ==
- Ramshah Tomar
- Anangpur Dam
- Tomar Clan
- Tomar Dynasty
- Tomaras of Gwalior
