= Tomaras of Delhi =

Northern Indian dynasty (736–1152)

Tomara dynasty
- c. 736–c. 1152
- Location of the Tomaras and neighbouring South Asian polities in 1000 CE.
- Status: Vassal state of the Gurjara-Pratihara dynasty (8th–10th century); Sovereign monarchy (10th–12th century)
- Capital: Anangpur (c. 736–c. 1052); Lal Kot, Delhi (c. 1052–c. 1152)
- Common languages: Apabhraṃśa
- Religion: Hinduism
- Government: Monarchy
- History
  - Established: c. 736
  - Disestablished: c. 1152
Preceded by	Succeeded by
Gurjara-Pratihara dynasty	Chahamanas of Shakambhari
- Today part of: India

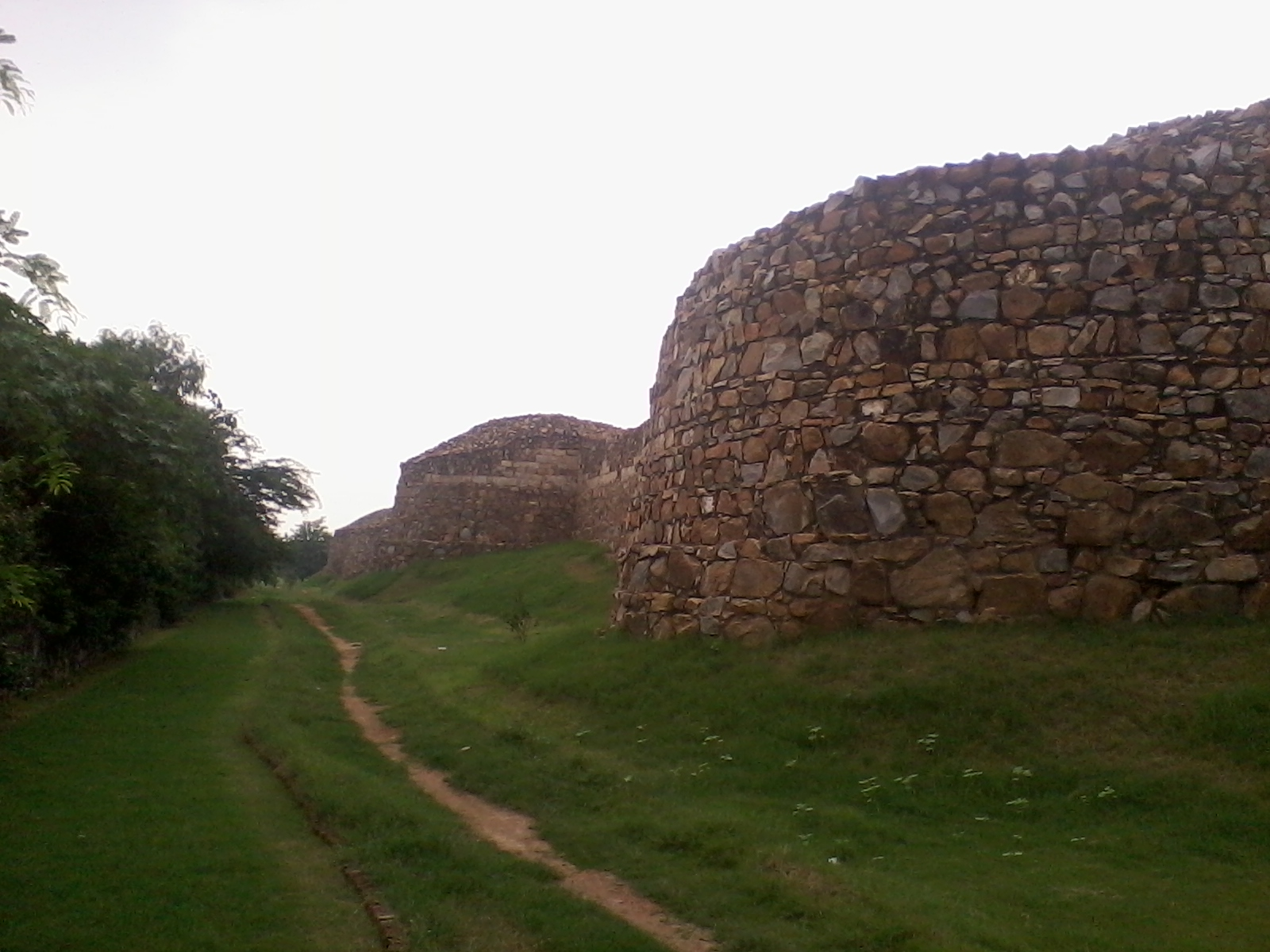
Lal Kot, the fort built by Anangpal Tomar.

The Tomaras of Delhi (also called Tomar dynasty in modern vernaculars due to schwa deletion) ruled parts of present-day Delhi and Haryana in India during 8th–12th century. Their rule over this region is attested to by multiple inscriptions and coins. In addition, much of the information about them comes from medieval bardic legends. They belonged to the Tomar clan of the Rajputs.

They were displaced by the Chahamanas of Shakambhari in the 12th century, who took over their capital in Delhi, but who were themselves soon displaced by the Ghurid ruler Muhammad of Ghor in 1192 CE.

== Territory ==
The Tomara territory included parts of the present-day Delhi and Haryana. A 13th century inscription states that the Tomaras ruled the Hariyanaka (Haryana) country before the Chahamanas and the Shakas (Muslims in this context). A 14th century inscription states that they built the Dhillika (Delhi) city in the Hariyana (Haryana) region, and that their rule was followed by that of the Chahamanas and the mlechchha Sahavadina (Shihab ad-Din).

The construction of the fortified wall called the Lal Kot is attributed to Anangpal Tomar. It is also known that the Tomara kingdom stretched to Hansi and Thanesar area.

== History ==
The Tomaras are known from some inscriptions and coins. However, much of the information about the dynasty comes from medieval bardic legends, which are not historically reliable. Because of this, the reconstruction of Tomara history is difficult.

=== As feudatories ===
The earliest extant historical reference to the Tomaras occurs in the Pehowa inscription issued during the reign of the Pratihara king Mahendrapala I (r. c. 885-910 CE). This undated inscription states that Jaula of the Tomara family became prosperous by serving an unnamed king. His descendants included Vajrata, Jajjuka, and Gogga. The inscription suggests that Gogga was a vassal of Mahendrapala I. It records the construction of three Vishnu temples by Gogga and his step-brothers Purna-raja and Deva-raja. The temples were located at Prithudaka (IAST: Pṛthūdaka; Pehowa), on the banks of the Sarasvati river.

No information is available about the immediate successors of Gogga. The Pehowa inscription suggests that this particular Tomara family was settled around the Karnal area. However, F. Kielhorn suggested that this Tomara family actually resided in Delhi: they may have visited Pehowa on pilgrimage, and built a temple there.

=== As sovereigns ===
As the Pratihara power declined, the Tomaras established a sovereign principality around Delhi by the 10th century. According to the bardic tradition, the king Anangapal Tuar (that is Anangapala II Tomara; not to be confused with the founder of the Tomara dynasty Anangpal I) founded Delhi in 1052 CE. A 1526 CE source names the successors of Anangapala as Tejapala, Madanapala, Kritapala, Lakhanapala and Prithvipala. The Dravya-Pariksha (1318 CE) of Thakkura Pheru mentions the coins of Madanapala, Prithvipala and another ruler, Chahadapala.

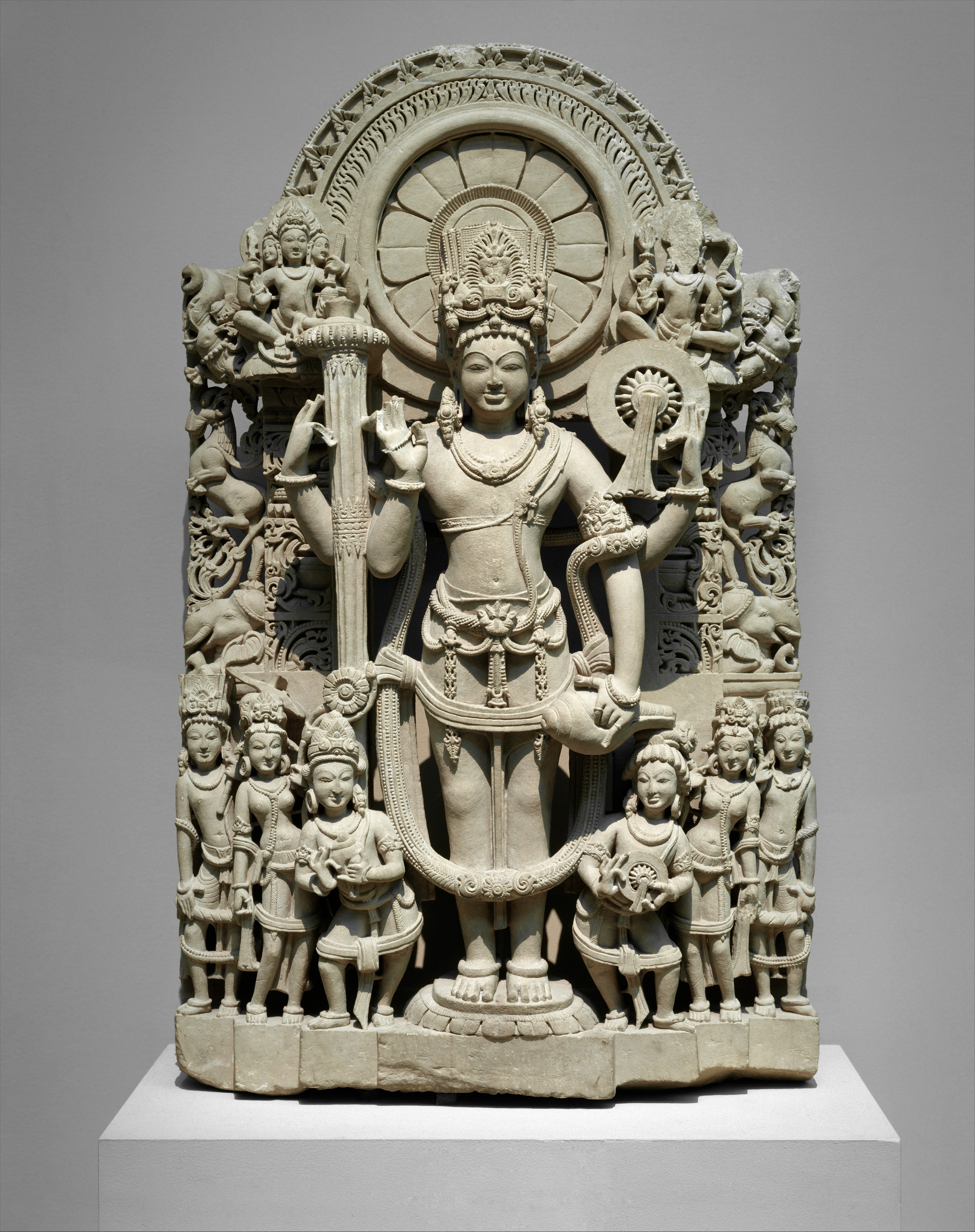
Vishnu, 10-11th century, Punjab, India. Metropolitan Museum of Art.

Soon after gaining independence, the Tomaras became involved in conflicts with their neighbours, the Chahamanas of Shakambhari and later on the Gahadavala dynasty. According to a 973 CE inscription of the Chahamana king Vigraharaja II, his ancestor Chandana (c. 900 CE) killed the Tomara chief Rudrena (or Rudra) in a battle. The Harsha stone inscription states that Chandana's descendant Simharaja (c. 944-971 CE) defeated a Tomara leader called Lavana or Salavana. Historian R. B. Singh identifies the defeated ruler as Tejapala. Another fragmentary Chahamana prashasti (eulogistic inscription), now at the Ajmer museum, mentions that the Chahamana king Arnoraja (c. 1135-1150 CE) invaded the Haritanaka country. This country is identified with the Tomara territory. According to the inscription, Arnoraja's army rendered the waters of the Kalindi river (Yamuna) muddy and the women of Hartinaka tearful, but Arnoraja's victory over the Tomaras was not decisive, as his son Vigraharaja IV had to fight the Tomaras. This may have been because Anoraja was unsuccessful of getting through the fort Lal Kot which had been built by the Tomara rulers.

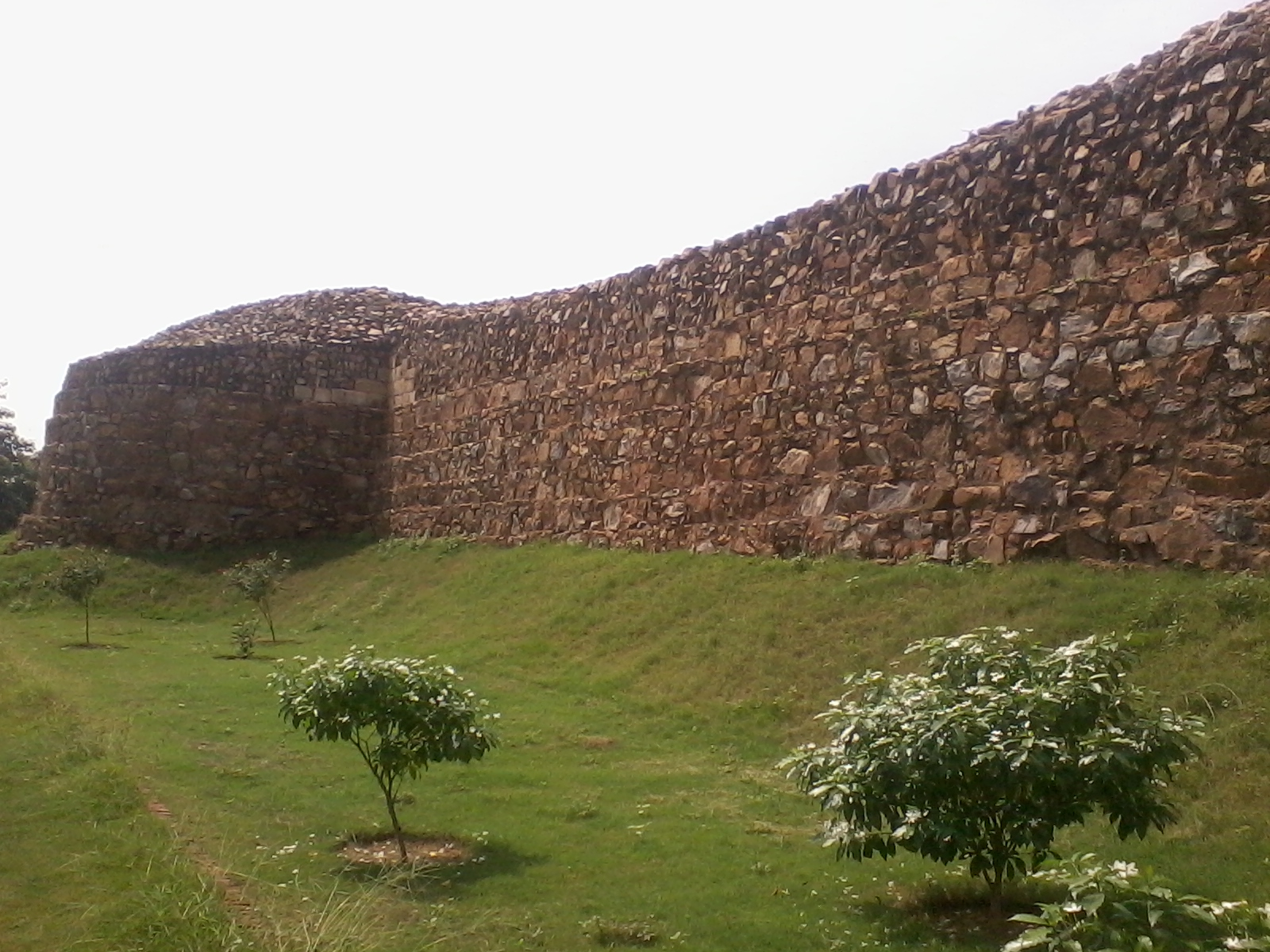
Fortified walls of one of the first fortresses in Delhi, Lal Kot, was built by Raja Anangpal Tomar II in 1052

The writings of the medieval Muslim historians suggest that a king named Mahipala was ruling Delhi in the 11th century. Although these medieval historians do not mention the dynasty of this king, he is identified as a Tomara ruler by some modern historians. Some coins featuring crude depictions of a horseman and a bull, and bearing the name "Mahipala", have been attributed to this king. These coins are similar to those of Mawdud of Ghazni (r. 1041-50 CE), confirming that Mahipala must have ruled in the 11th century. The horseman-and-bull were a characteristic of the Kabul Shahi coinage; Mawdud probably adopted this style after capturing the Shahi territories. Mahipala probably imitated the same style after capturing Asigarh Fort in Hansi and Thaneshvara regions from Mawdud. Some fragmentary Tomara inscriptions have been discovered from Mahipalpur near Delhi. Historian Y. D. Sharma theorizes that Mahipala established a new capital at Mahipalapura (now Mahipialpur).

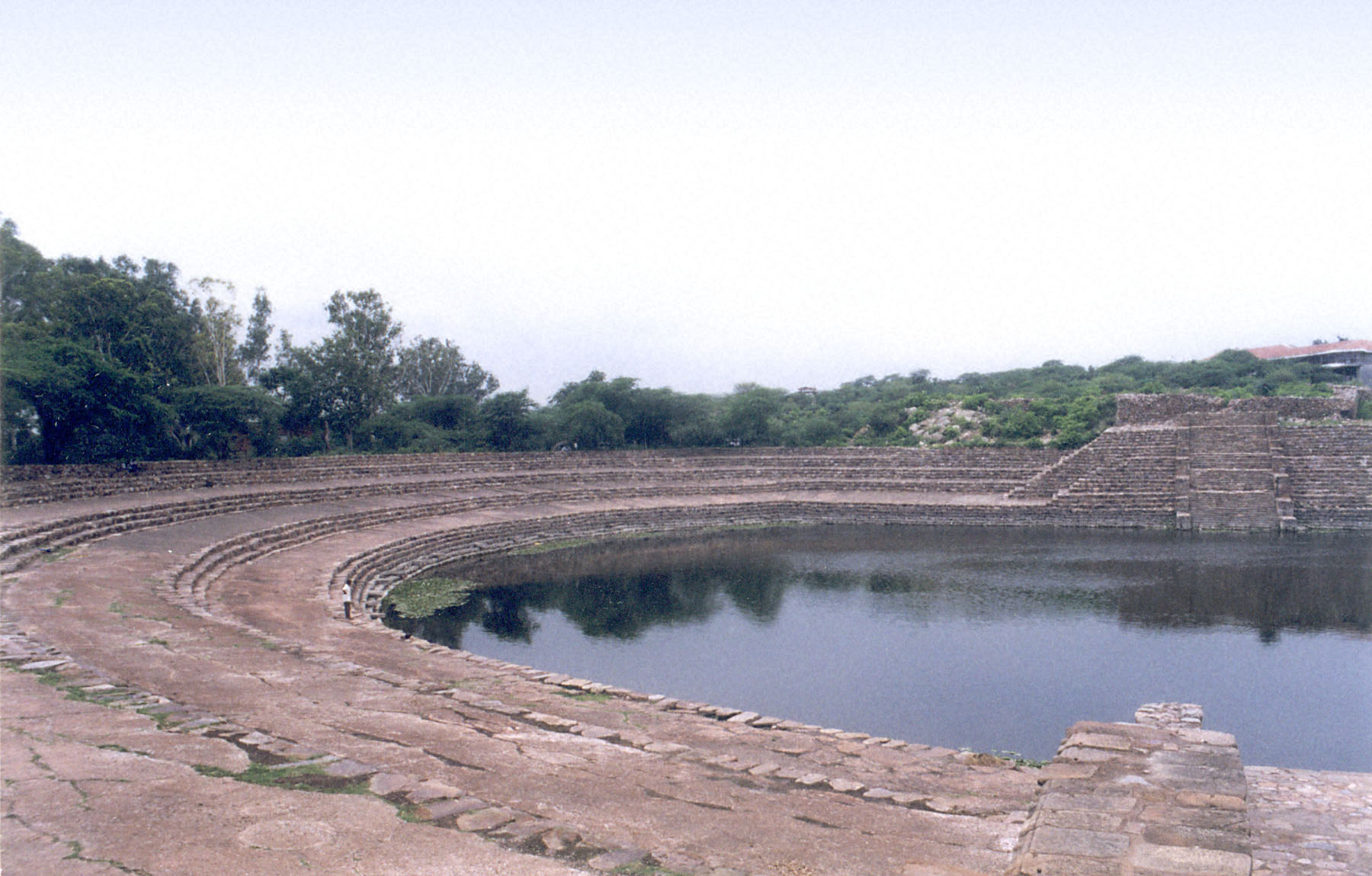
The construction of the Suraj Kund is attributed to a Tomara king

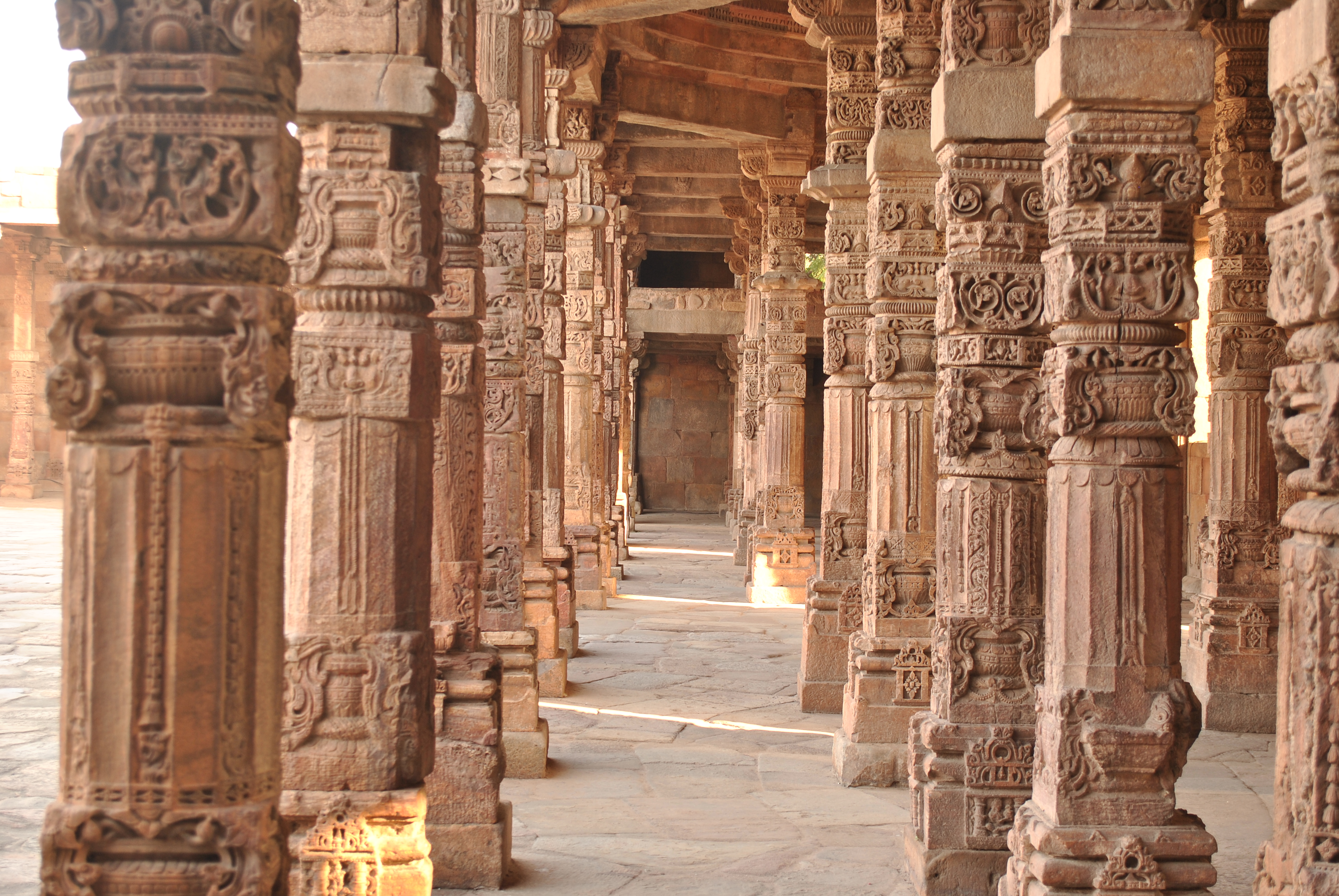
Ancient Hindu and Jain temple pillars reused in the Qutb Minar complex.

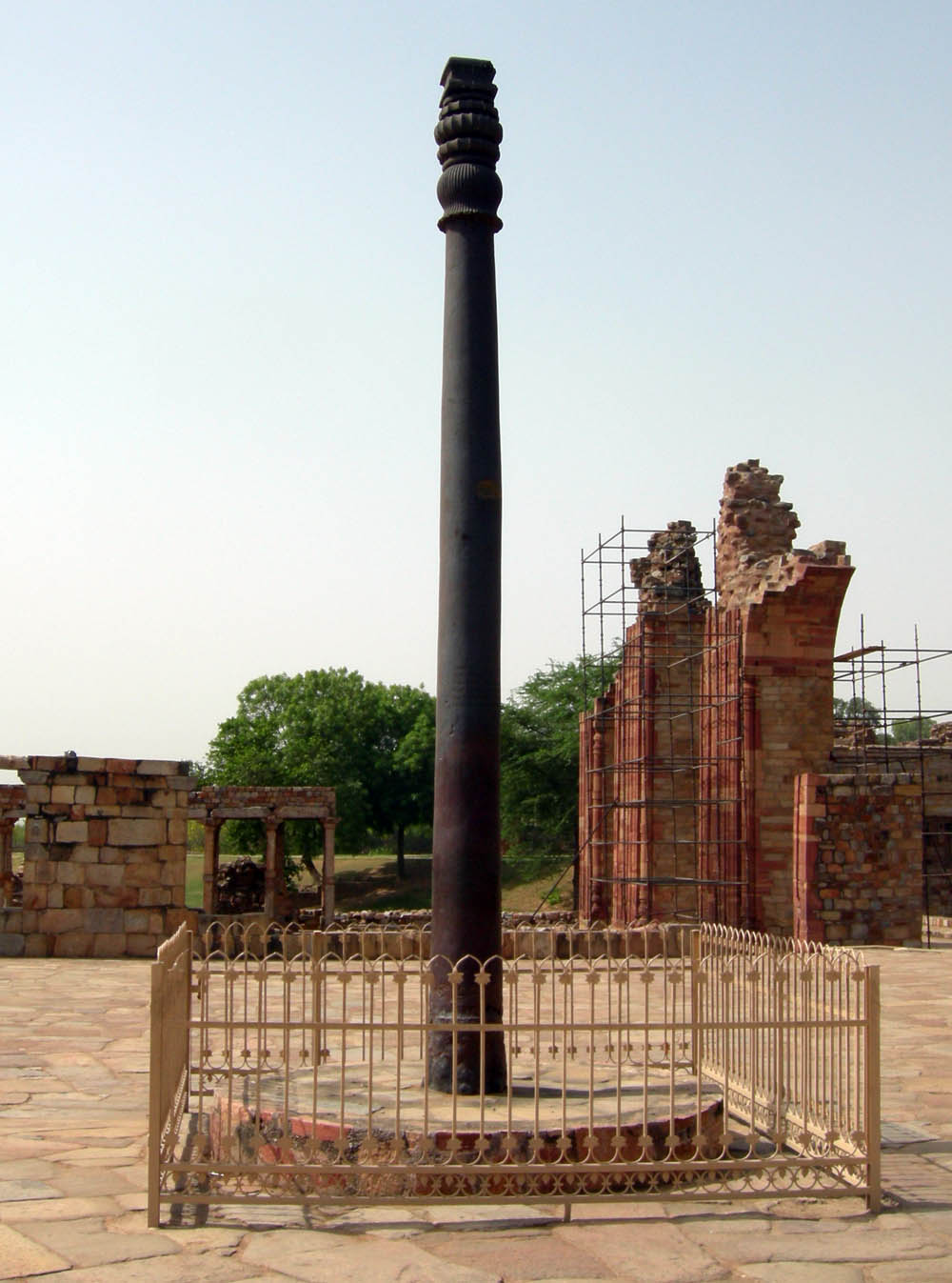
The iron pillar of Delhi, raised by Chandragupta II c.400 CE, was moved to its present location in Delhi by Anangpal Tomar.

Three Tomara kings seem to have shared the name "Anangapala" (IAST: Anaṅgapāla). One of these is said to have established the Lal Kot citadel in the Mehrauli area. The construction of the Anang Tal tank and the Anangpur Dam is also attributed to him. His coins also feature the horseman-and-bull figure, and bear the title "Shri Samanta-deva". These coins are very similar to those of the Shakambhari Chahamana kings Someshvara and Prithviraja III, indicating that Anangapala was a contemporary of these 12th century kings. One of the several inscriptions on the Iron Pillar of Delhi mentions Anangapala. A medieval legend mentioned in a copy of Prithviraj Raso mentions a legend about the pillar: a Brahmin once told Anangapala (alias Bilan Deo) that the base of the pillar rested on the head of the Vasuki serpent, and that his rule would last as long as the pillar stood upright. Out of curiosity, Anangapala dug out the pillar, only to find it smeared with the blood of Vasuki. Realizing his mistake, the king ordered it to be re-instated, but it remained loose ("dhili"). Because of this, the area came to be known as "Dhilli" (modern Delhi). This legend is obviously a myth.

=== Decline ===
The bardic legends state that the last Tomar Rajput king, Anangpal Tomar (also known as Anangapala), handed over the throne of Delhi to his son-in-law Prithviraj Chauhan (Prithviraja III of the Chahamana dynasty of Shakambhari; r. c. 1179-1192 CE). However, this claim is not correct: the historical evidence shows that Prithviraj inherited Delhi from his father Someshvara. According to the Bijolia inscription of Someshvara, his brother Vigraharaja IV had captured Dhillika (Delhi) and Ashika (Hansi). He probably defeated the Tomara ruler Anangapala III.

== See also ==
- History of Delhi
- History of Haryana
- Tomar (Rajput clan)
- Tomaras of Gwalior
- Tomaras of Nurpur
- Tomaras of Beja
