= Qutb Minar complex =

Qutb Minar and its Monuments, Delhi
UNESCO World Heritage Site
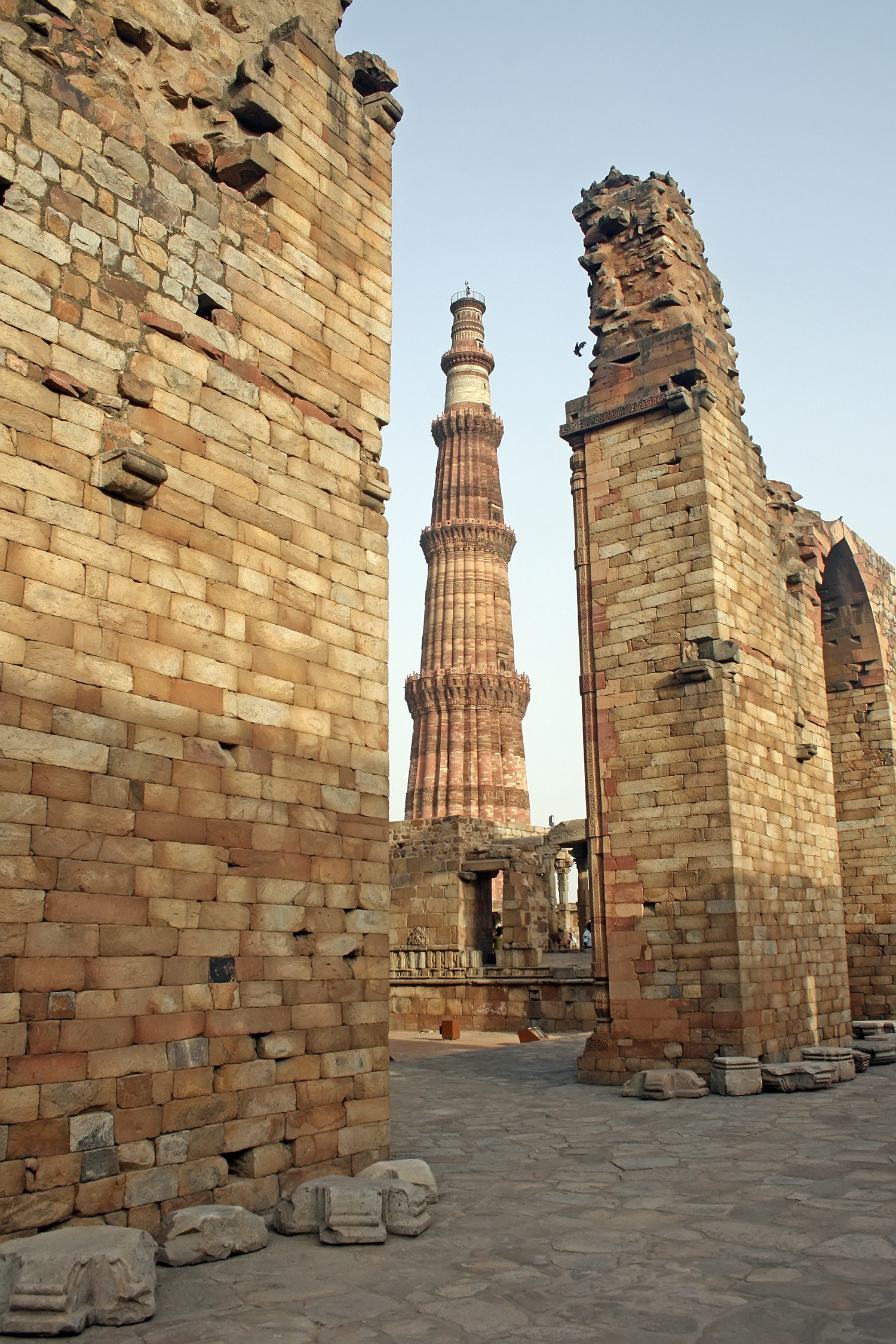
- Qutub Minar

- Location within Delhi Location within India
- Location: Mehrauli, India
- Criteria: Cultural: v
- Reference: 233
- Inscription: 1993 (17th Session)
- Coordinates: 28°31′28″N 77°11′08″E

The Qutb Minar complex are monuments and buildings from the Delhi Sultanate at Mehrauli in Delhi, India. Construction of the Qutub Minar "victory tower" in the complex, named after the religious figure Sufi Saint Khwaja Qutbuddin Bakhtiar Kaki, was begun by Qutb-ud-din Aibak, who later became the first Sultan of Delhi of the Mamluk dynasty (Gulam Vansh). It was continued by his successor Iltutmish (a.k.a. Altamash), and finally completed much later by Firoz Shah Tughlaq, a Sultan of Delhi from the Tughlaq dynasty (1320–1412) in 1368 AD. The Qubbat-ul-Islam Mosque (Dome of Islam), later corrupted into Quwwat-ul Islam, stands next to the Qutb Minar. The Qutub Minar also bears numerous inscriptions in Arabic and Nagari characters at various locations, which reveal its history.

Many subsequent rulers, including the Tughlaqs, Alauddin Khalji and the British added structures to the complex. Apart from the Qutb Minar and the Quwwat ul-Islam Mosque, other structures in the complex include the Alai Darwaza gate, the Alai Minar and the Iron pillar. Inside the complex lie the tombs of Iltutmish, Alauddin Khalji and Imam Zamin.

Today, the adjoining area spread over with a host of old monuments, including Balban's tomb, has been developed by the Archaeological Survey of India (ASI) as the Mehrauli Archaeological Park, and INTACH has restored some 40 monuments in the Park. It is also the venue of the annual 'Qutub Festival', held in November–December, where artists, musicians and dancers perform over three days.

== Alai Darwaza ==
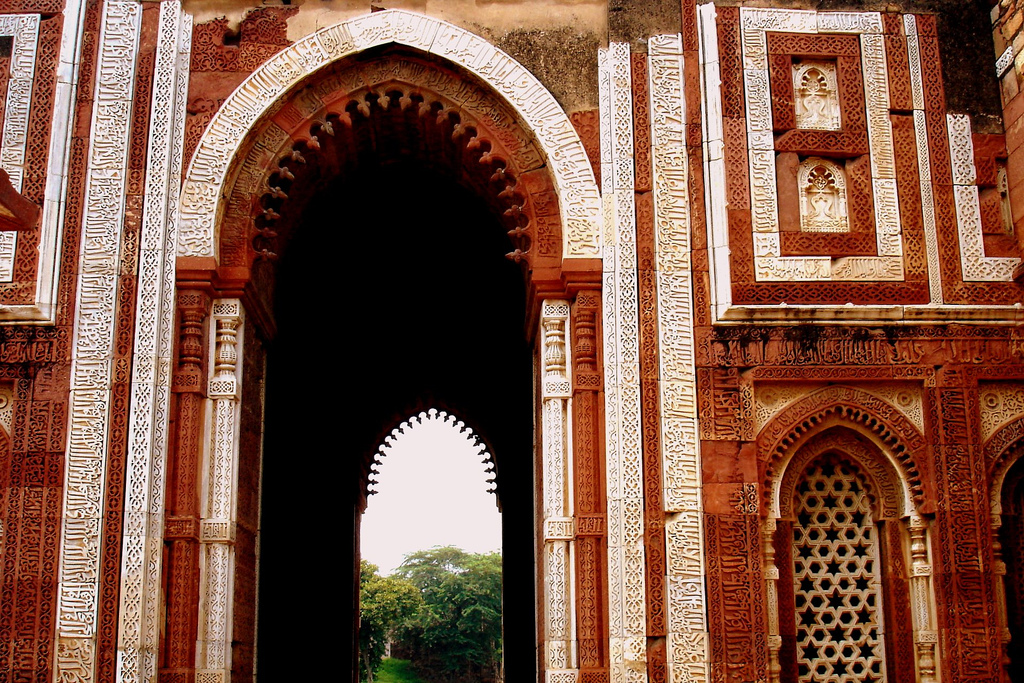
Close up of the inscriptions on entrance arch, Alai Darwaza built by Alauddin Khalji

The Alai Darwaza is a main gateway from the southern side of the Qutub. It was built by the second Khalji, Sultan of Delhi, Ala-ud-din Khalji in 1311 AD, who also added a court to the pillared hall to the eastern side, it was to serve as one of four grand gates for his vast expansion to the Quwwat-ul-Islam mosque.. The domed gateway is decorated with red stone and inlaid white marble decorations, inscriptions in Naskh script, latticed stone screens, and showcases the remarkable craftsmanship of the Turkish artisans who worked on it. This is the first building in India to employ Islamic architecture principles in its construction and ornamentation.

The Slave dynasty did not employ true Islamic architecture styles and used false domes and false arches. This makes the Alai Darwaza, the earliest example of first true arches and true domes in India. However, the unusually thick walls and shallow dome indicate that the builders had not yet mastered constructing domes. It is considered to be one of the most important buildings built in the Delhi sultanate period. With its pointed arches and spearhead of fringes, identified as lotus buds, it adds grace to the Quwwat-ul-Islam mosque to which it served as an entrance.

== Qutb Minar ==
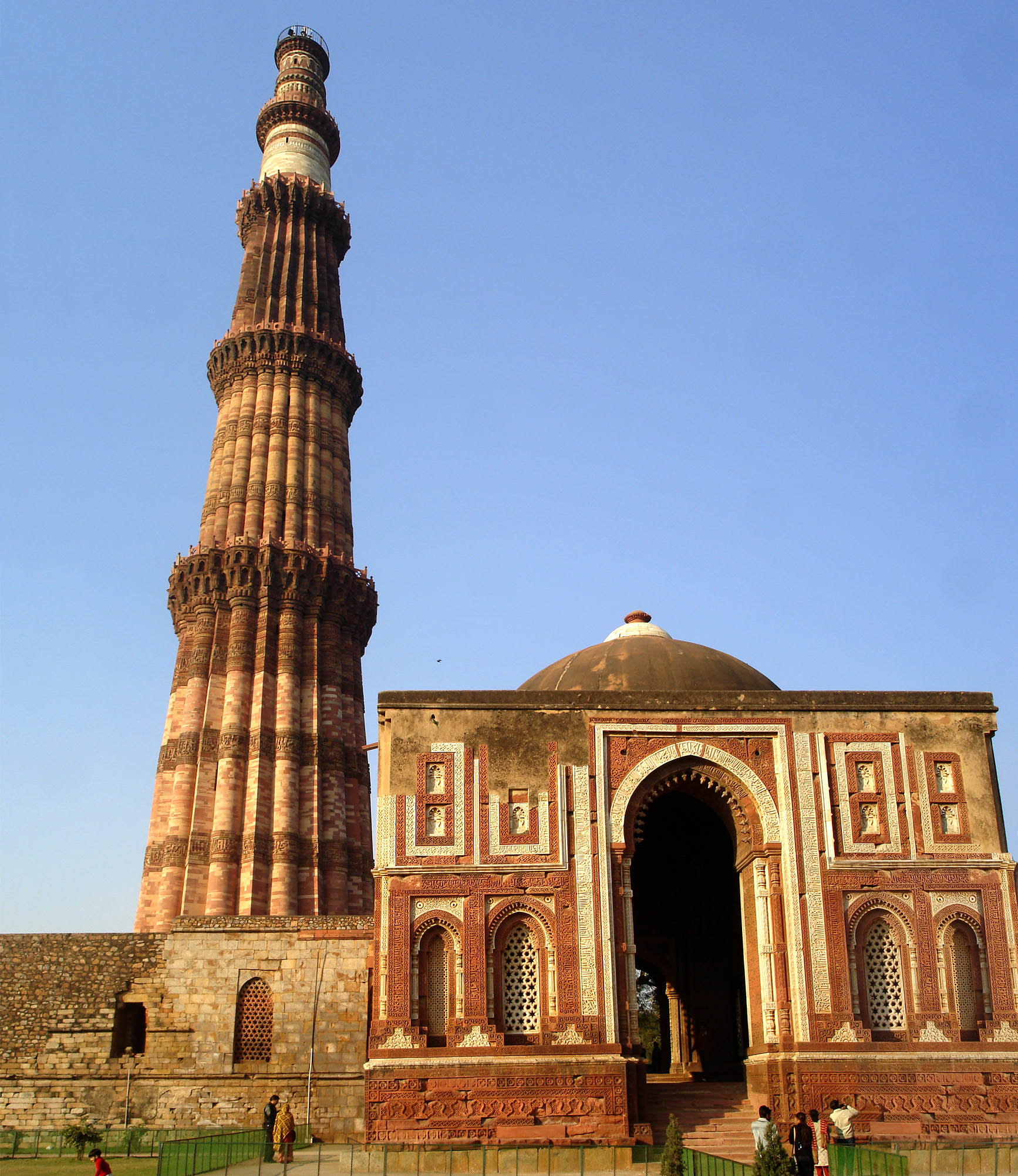
Qutb Minar and Alai Darwaza (Alai Gate), the entrance to the Quwwat-Ul-Islam Mosque

The Qutb Minar is inspired by the Minaret of Jam in Afghanistan, it is an important example of early Afghan architecture, which later evolved into Indo-Islamic Architecture. The Qutb Minar is 72.5 metres (239 ft) high, making it the tallest minaret in the world built of bricks. It has five distinct storeys, each marked by a projecting balcony carried on muqarnas corbel and tapers from a diameter 14.3 metres at the base to 2.7 metres at the top, which is 379 steps away. It is listed as a UNESCO World Heritage Site along with surrounding buildings and monuments.

Built as a Victory Tower, to celebrate the victory of Muhammad Ghori over the Rajput king, Prithviraj Chauhan, in 1192 AD, by his then viceroy, Qutb-ud-din Aibak, later the first Sultan of Mamluk dynasty. Its construction also marked the beginning of Muslim rule in India. It was built using red sandstone and marble. Inscriptions record that 27 Hindu and Jain temples were torn down and used for its creation. Even today the Qutb remains one of the most important "Towers of Victory" in the Islamic world. Aibak however, could only build the first storey, for this reason the lower storey is replete with eulogies to Muhammad Ghori. The next three floors were added by his son-in-law and successor, Iltutmish. The minar was first struck by lightning in 1368 AD, which knocked off its top storey, after that it was replaced by the existing two floors by Firoz Shah Tughlaq, a later Sultan of Delhi from 1351 to 1388, and faced with white marble and sandstone enhancing the distinctive variegated look of the minar, as seen in lower three storeys. Thus the structure displays a marked variation in architectural styles from Aibak to that of Tughlaq dynasty. The inside has intricate carvings of the verses from the Quran.

The minar made with numerous superimposed flanged and cylindrical shafts in the interior, and fluted columns on the exterior, which have a 40 cm thick veneer of red and buff coloured sandstone; all surrounded by bands of intricate carving in Kufic style of Islamic calligraphy, giving the minar the appearance of bundled reeds. It stands just outside the Quwwatul mosque, and an Arabic inscription suggests that it might have been built to serve as a place for the muezzin, to call the faithfuls for namaz. Also marking a progression in era, is the appearance of inscriptions in a bold and cursive Thuluth script of calligraphy on the Qutb Minar, distinguished by strokes that thicken on the top, as compared to Kufic in earlier part of the construction.

Inscriptions also indicate further repairs by Sultan Sikander Lodi in 1503, when it was struck by lightning once again. In 1802, the cupola on the top was thrown down and the whole pillar was damaged by an earthquake. It was repaired by Major R. Smith of the Royal Engineers who restored the Qutub Minar in 1823 replacing the cupola with a Bengali-style chhatri which was later removed by Governor General, Lord Hardinge in 1848, as it looked out of place, and now stands in the outer lawns of the complex, popularly known as Smith's Folly.

After an accident involving school children, entry to the Qutub Minar is closed to public since 1981, while Qutub archaeological area remains open for public. In 2004, Seismic monitors were installed on the minar, which revealed in 2005 Delhi earthquake, no damage or substantial record of shakes. The reason for this has been cited as the use of lime mortar and rubble masonry which absorbs the tremors; it is also built on rocky soil, which further protects it during earthquakes.

== Quwwat-ul-Islam Mosque ==
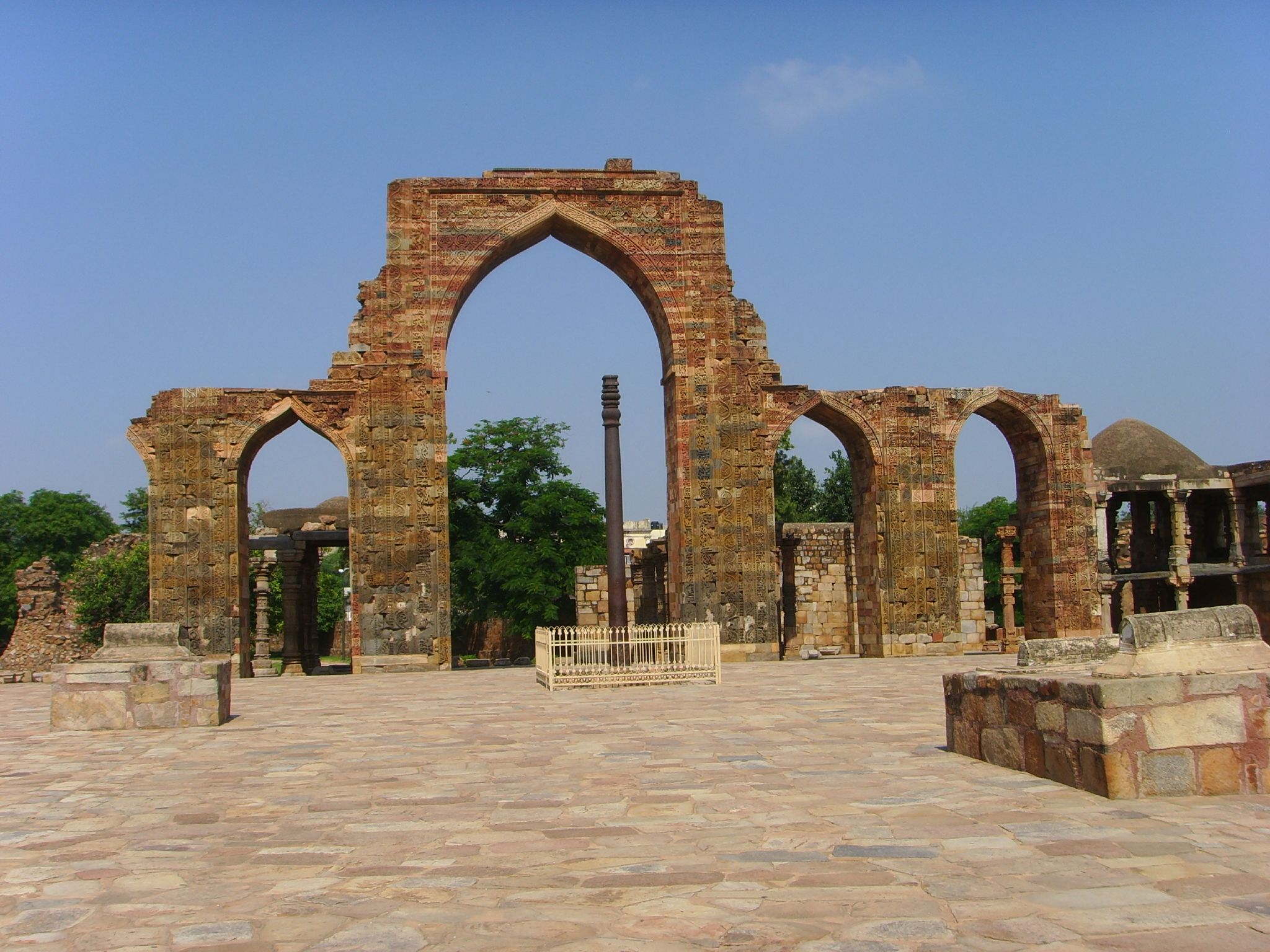
Quwwat-ul-Islam (or Might of Islam) mosque started in 1193 CE by Qutb-ud-din-Aibak to mark his victory over the Rajputs

The Quwwat-ul-Islam (Arabic: قوة الإسلام, lit. 'Might of Islam') mosque, also known as the Qutub Mosque or the Great Mosque of Delhi, was commissioned by Qutb-ud-din Aibak, founder of the Mamluk or Slave dynasty and built using spolia from 27 temples. It was built near the site of a pre-demolished large temple located in the centre of a citadel.

'The conqueror entered the city and its vicinity was freed from idols and idol-worship; and in the sanctuaries of the images of the gods, mosques were raised by the worshippers of the one God.'

— Quṭb al-Dīn Aibak's chronicler, Hasan Nizami, Taj-ul-Maasir

It was the first mosque built in Delhi after the Islamic conquest of India and the oldest surviving example of Ghurids architecture in Indian subcontinent. The construction of this Jami Masjid (congregational mosque), started in the year 1193 AD, when Aibak was the commander of Muhammad Ghori's garrison that occupied Delhi. To leave the imprint of his religion to the new territory, Aibak decided to erect a mosque epitomising the might of Islam and chose his site, the heart of the captured Rajput citadel of Qila Rai Pithora. The Qutub Minar was built simultaneously with the mosque but appears to be a stand-alone structure, built as the 'Minar of Jami Masjid', for the muezzin to perform adhan, call for prayer, and also as a qutub, an Axis or Pole of Islam. It is reminiscent in style and design of the Adhai-din-ka Jhonpra or Ajmer mosque at Ajmer, Rajasthan, also built by Aibak during the same time, also constructed by demolishing earlier temples and a Sanskrit school, at the site.

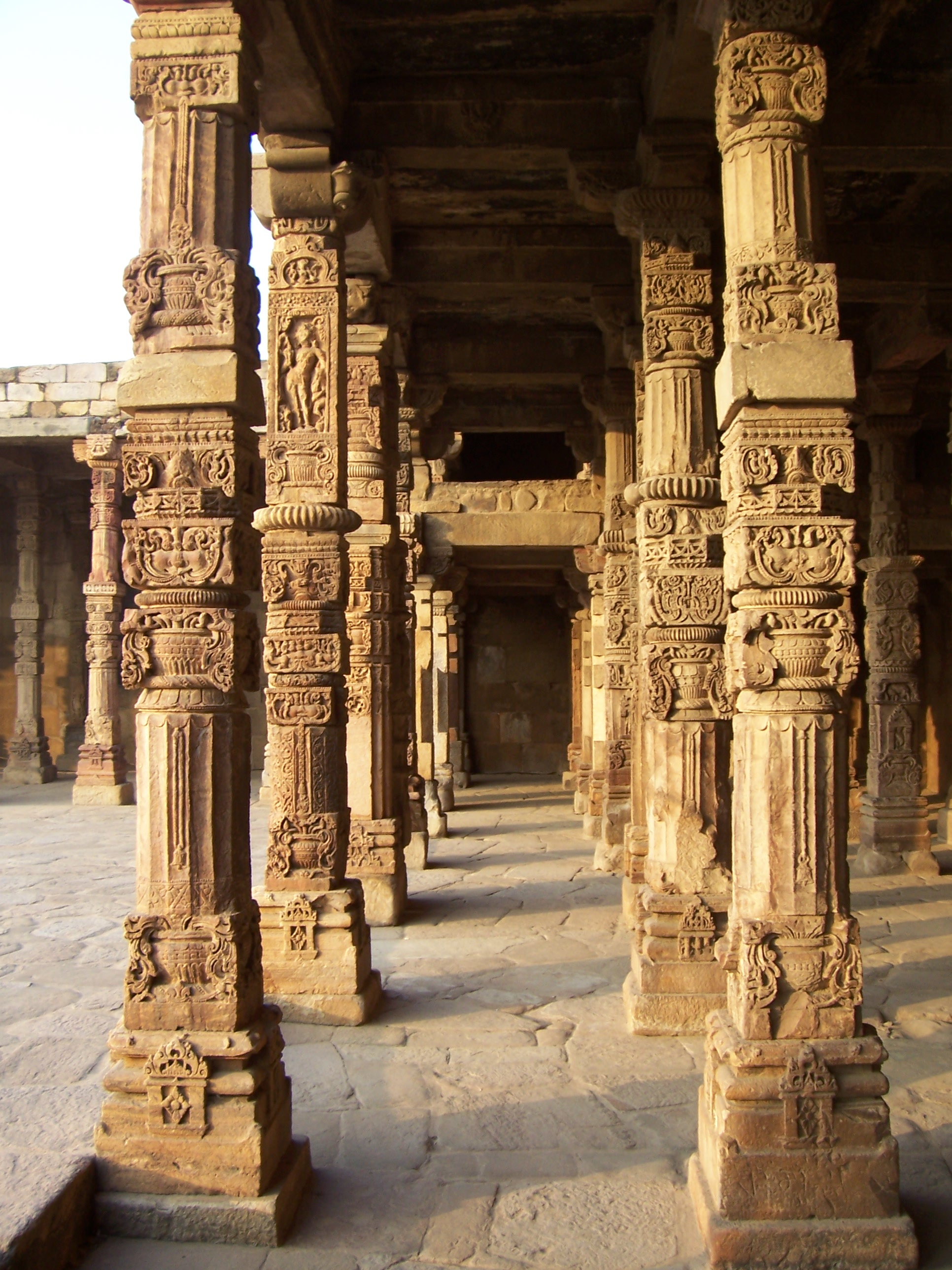
Intricate stone carvings on the cloister columns at Quwwat ul-Islam Mosque, Qutb complex, Delhi – Hindu pillars sporting Hindu iconography

Of the site selected by Aibak for the construction of a mosque, Ibn Battuta, the 14th century Arab traveller, says, before the taking of Delhi it had been a Hindu temple, which the Hindus called elbut-khana, but after that event it was used as a mosque'. Archaeological Survey of India states that the mosque was raised over the remains of a temple and, in addition, it was also constructed from materials taken from other demolished temples, a fact recorded on the main eastern entrance. According to a Persian inscription still on the inner eastern gateway, the mosque was built by the parts taken by destruction of twenty-seven Hindu temples built previously during the reigns of the Tomaras and Prithviraj Chauhan, and leaving certain parts of the temple outside the mosque proper. Historical records compiled by Muslim historian Maulana Hakim Saiyid Abdul Hai attest to the iconoclasm of Qutb-ud-din Aibak. This pattern of iconoclasm was common during his reign. Some medieval Muslim historians and travellers often ascribed the construction of the complex to Mamluk Sultan Iltutmish, rather than to Qutb ud-Din Aibak as is commonly accepted. Ibn Batuta also states that near the eastern gate of the mosque were two very big idols of copper connected together by stones. Every one who left the mosque treaded over them.

The mosque is one of the earliest extant mosques in India. The original dimensions of the mosque had a courtyard measuring 43 m (141 ft) by 33 m (108 ft). The prayer hall, located on the west measures 45 m (148 ft) by 12 m (39 ft). The mosque has grey colonnades made of greystone with three bays in east and two bays deep on the north and the south. Extensions were made to the mosque during 1296 when its dimensions in north and south were extended by 35 m (115 ft). The famous iron pillar is located on the stone pavement in front of it, while Qutub Minar is located west of the main entrance. The central arch of the mosque is ogee in shape and is 6.5 m (21 ft) wide and 16 m (52 ft) tall. The side arches are smaller in size. The screen is sculpted with religious texts and floral patterns. Desai believes that the mosque was not constructed in scientific style but in Corbel style as indicated by the variations in the pattern of the arches.

The mosque is built on a raised and paved courtyard, measuring 141 ft (43 m) × 105 ft (32 m), surrounded by pillared cloisters added by Iltutmish between 1210 and 1220 AD. The stone screen between prayer hall and the courtyard, stood 16 mt at its highest was added in 1196 AD, the corbelled arches had Arabic inscriptions and motifs. Entrances to the courtyard, also uses ornate mandap dome from temples, whose pillars are used extensively throughout the edifice, and in the sanctuary beyond the tall arched screens. What survives today of the sanctuary on the western side are the arched screens in between, which once led to a series of aisles with low-domed ceilings for worshippers. Expansion of the mosque continued after the death of Qutb. Qutbuddin's successor Iltutmish, extended the original prayer hall screen by three more arches. By the time of Iltutmish, the Mamluk empire had stabilised enough that the Sultan could replace most of his conscripted Hindu masons with Muslims. This explains why the arches added under Iltutmish are stylistically more Islamic than the ones erected under Qutb's rule, also because the material used was not from demolished temples. Alauddin Khalji (d.1316) sought to greatly expand the mosque to become 288 by 135 m, which would have made it one of the largest mosques in the world, however he died before it could be completed. Of the four planned gates, only the southern, the Alai Darwaza, was built. As well as a court to the east of the mosque in 1300 AD.

The mosque is in ruins today, but indigenous corbelled arches, floral motifs, and geometric patterns can be seen among the Islamic architectural structures. To the west of the Quwwat ul-Islam mosque is the tomb of Iltutmish which was built by the monarch in 1235.

== Iron pillar ==
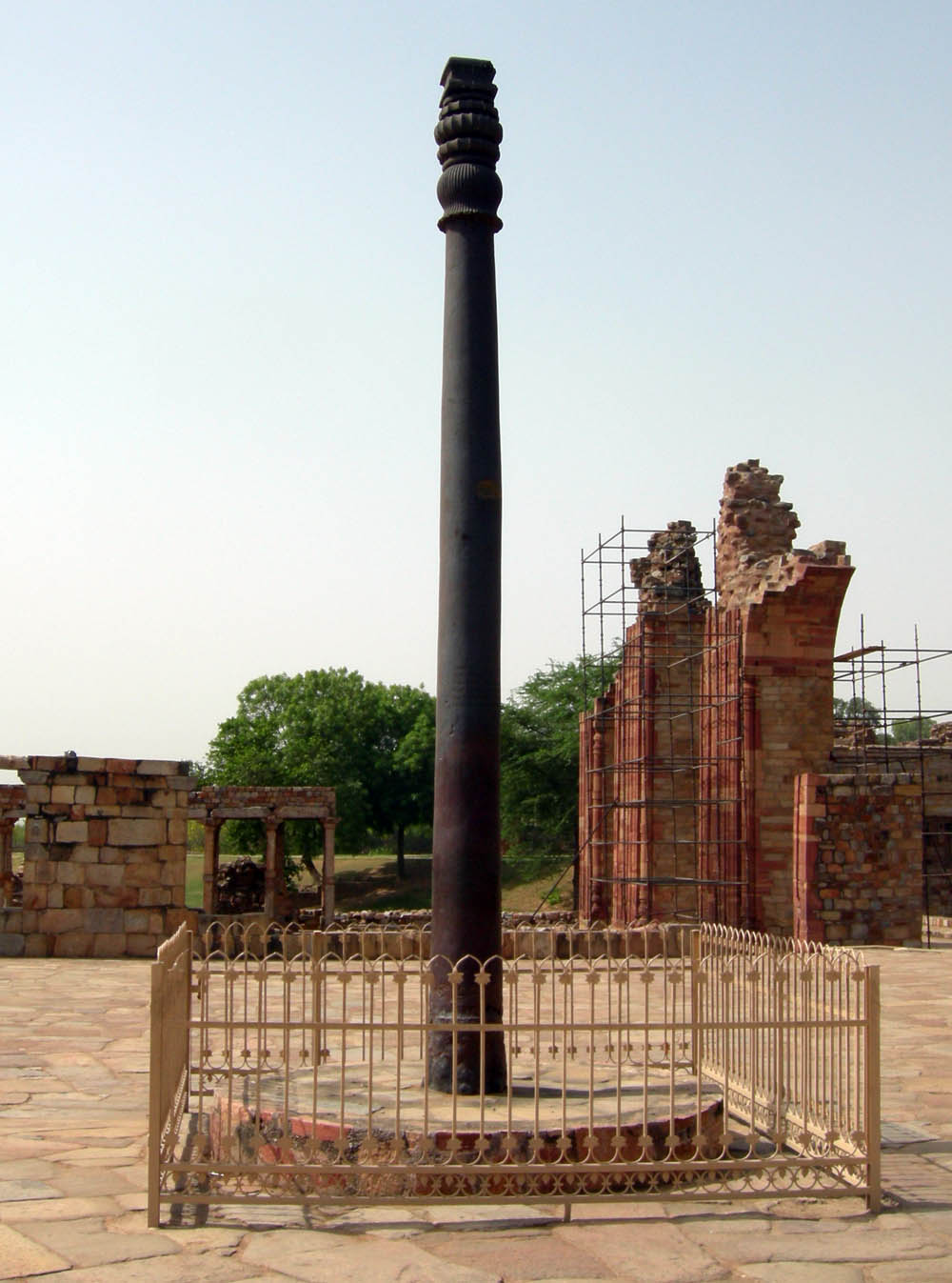
The Iron pillar in the Qutb Complex

The iron pillar is one of the world's foremost metallurgical curiosities. The pillar, 7.21-metre high and weighing more than six tonnes, was originally erected by Chandragupta II Vikramaditya (375–414 AD) in front of a Vishnu Temple complex at Udayagiri around 402 AD, and later shifted by Anangpal in the 10th century CE from Udaygiri to its present location. Anangpal built a Vishnu Temple here and wanted this pillar to be a part of that temple.

The estimated weight of the decorative bell of the pillar is 646 kg while the main body weighs 5,865 kg, thus making the entire pillar weigh 6,511 kg. The pillar bears an inscription in Sanskrit in Brahmi script dating 4th century AD, which indicates that the pillar was set up as a Vishnudhvaja, standard of god, on the hill known as Vishnupada in memory of a mighty king named Chandra, believed to Chandragupta II. A deep socket on the top of this ornate capital suggests that probably an image of Garuda was fixed into it, as common in such flagpoles.

== Tombs ==
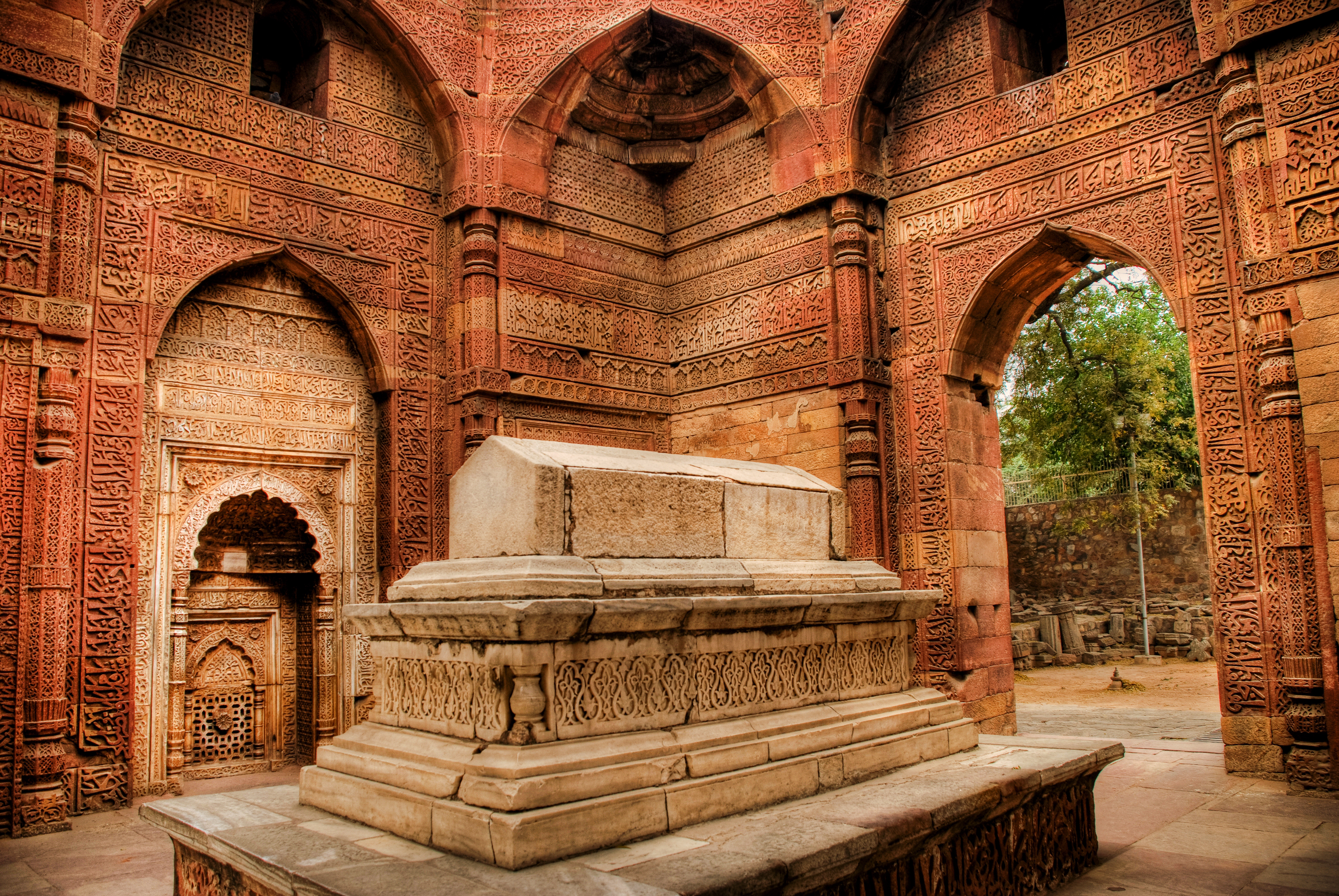
Tomb of Iltutmish

=== Tomb of Shams al-Din Iltutmish ===
The tomb of the Delhi Sultanate ruler, Iltutmish, a second Sultan of Delhi (r. 1211–1236 AD), built 1235 CE, is also part of the Qutb Minar Complex in Mehrauli, New Delhi. The central chamber is a 9 mt. sq. and has squinches, suggesting the existence of a dome, which has since collapsed. The main cenotaph, in white marble, is placed on a raised platform in the centre of the chamber. The facade is known for its ornate carving, both at the entrance and the interior walls. The interior west wall has a prayer niche (mihrab) decorated with marble, and a rich amalgamation of Hindu motifs into Islamic architecture, such as bell-and-chain, tassel, lotus, diamond emblems.

In 1914, during excavations by Archaeological Survey of India's (ASI) Gordon Sanderson, the grave chamber was discovered. From the north of the tomb 20 steps lead down to the actual burial vault.

=== Tomb of Imam Zamin ===
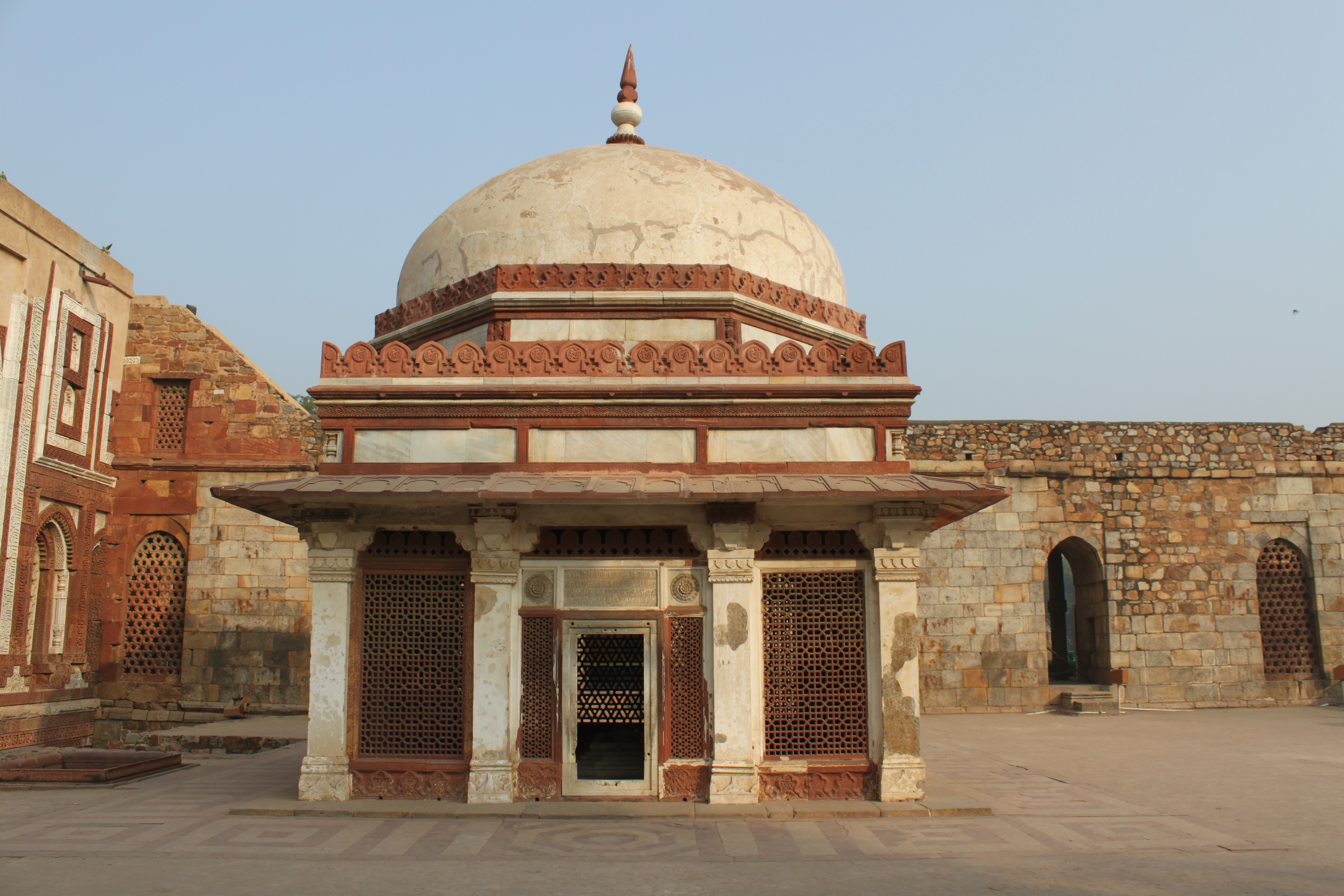
Tomb of Imam Zamin

The Tomb of Imam Zamin is a 16th-century tomb located in the Qutb Minar complex, Mehrauli, Delhi in India. It houses the tomb of Mohammad Ali (popularly known as Imam Zamin), an Islamic cleric who migrated from Turkestan to India during the reign of Sikandar Lodi. The tomb was built by Ali himself during the reign of Mughal emperor Humayun. This tomb has no relation with the other monuments of the complex.

== Ala-ud-din Khilji's tomb and madrasa ==
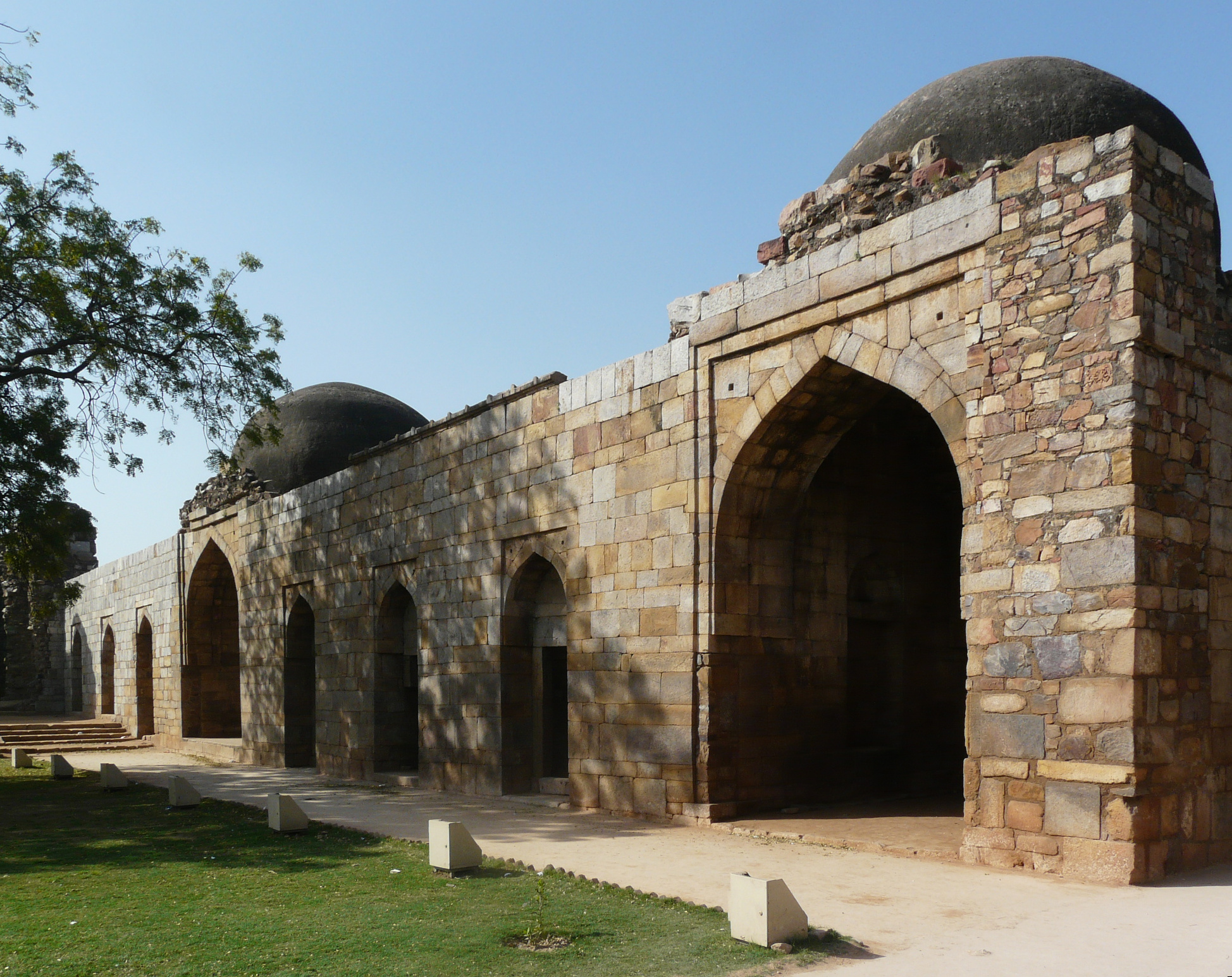
Alauddin Khalji's Madrasa, which also has his tomb to the south, ca 1316 AD

At the back of the complex, southwest of the mosque, stands an L-shaped construction, consisting of Alauddin Khilji's tomb dating ca 1316 AD, and a madrasa, an Islamic seminary built by him. Khalji was the second Sultan of Delhi from the Khalji dynasty, who ruled from 1296 to 1316 AD.

The central room of the building, which has his tomb, has now lost its dome, though many rooms of the seminary or college are intact, and since been restored. There were two small chambers connected to the tomb by passages on either side. Fergusson in his book suggested the existence, to the west of the tomb, of seven rooms, two of which had domes and windows. The remains of the tomb building suggest that there was an open courtyard on the south and west sides of the tomb building, and that one room in the north served as an entrance.

It was the first example in India, of a tomb standing alongside a madrasa. Nearby stands the Alai Minar, an ambitious tower, he started constructing to rival the Qutb Minar, though he died when only its first storey was built and its construction abandoned thereafter. It now stands, north of the mosque.

The tomb is in a very dilapidated condition. It is believed that Ala-ud-din's body was brought to the complex from Siri and buried in front of the mosque, which formed part of the madrasa adjoining the tomb. Firoz Shah Tughluq, who undertook repairs of the tomb complex, mentioned a mosque within the madrasa.

== Alai Minar ==
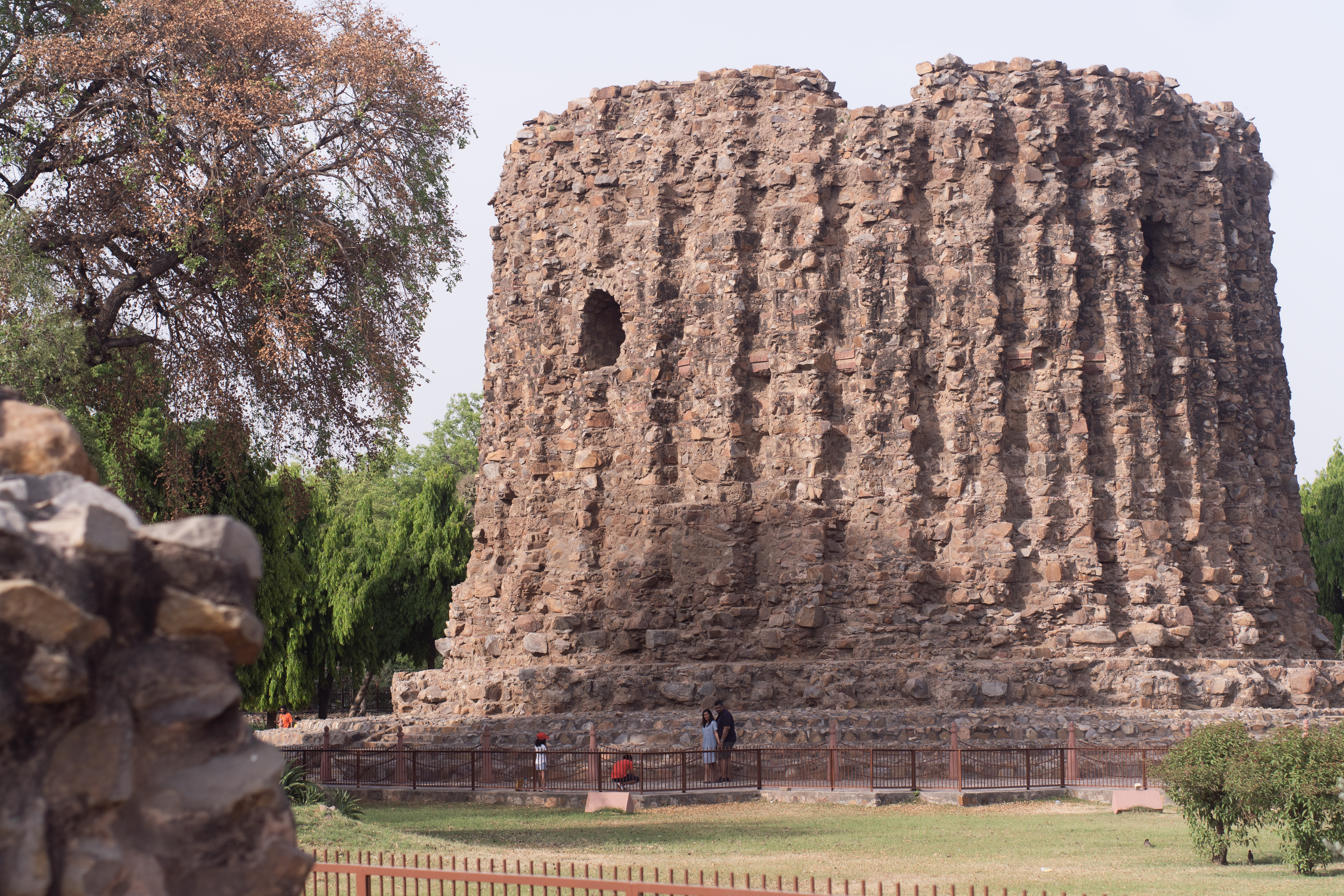
Alai Minar

Alauddin Khalji started building the Alai Minar, as part of his planned expansion of Quwwat ul-Islam mosque. Its diameter is twice as large as that of the Qutb Minar and was intended to be twice as tall, a staggering 145 m high, which would've made it one of the tallest buildings in the world at the time. The construction was however abandoned, just after the completion of the 25-metre-high (82 ft) first-story core; soon after the death of Alauddin in 1316, and never taken up by his successors of Khalji Dynasty. The first storey of the Alai Minar, a giant rubble masonry core, still stands today, which was evidently intended to be covered with dressed stone later on. Noted Sufi poet and saint of his times, Amir Khusro in his work, Tarikh-i-Alai, mentions Ala-ud-din's intentions to extend the mosque and also constructing another minar.

== Other monuments ==
A short distance west of the enclosure, in Mehrauli village, is the Tomb of Adham Khan who, according to legend drove the beautiful Hindu singer Roopmati to suicide following the capture of Mandu in Madhya Pradesh. When Mughal Emperor Jalaluddin Akbar became displeased with him due to allegations of corruption and political disagreements, Akbar personally struck him down and had him twice heaved off a terrace in the Agra Fort to ensure his death. Several archaeological monuments dot the Mehrauli Archaeological Park, including the Balban's tomb, Jamali Kamali Mosque and Tomb.

There are some Mughal summer palaces in the area: the Zafar Mahal, the Jahaz Mahal next to Hauz-i-Shamsi lake, and the tombs of the later Mughal emperors of India, inside a royal enclosure near the dargah shrine of Sufi saint, Qutbuddin Bakhtiar Kaki. Here an empty space between two of the tombs, sargah, was intended for the last Mughal emperor of India, Bahadur Shah Zafar who died in exile in Rangoon, Burma, in 1862, following his implication in the Indian Rebellion of 1857. Also standing nearby is the Moti Masjid mosque in white marble.

== Gallery ==
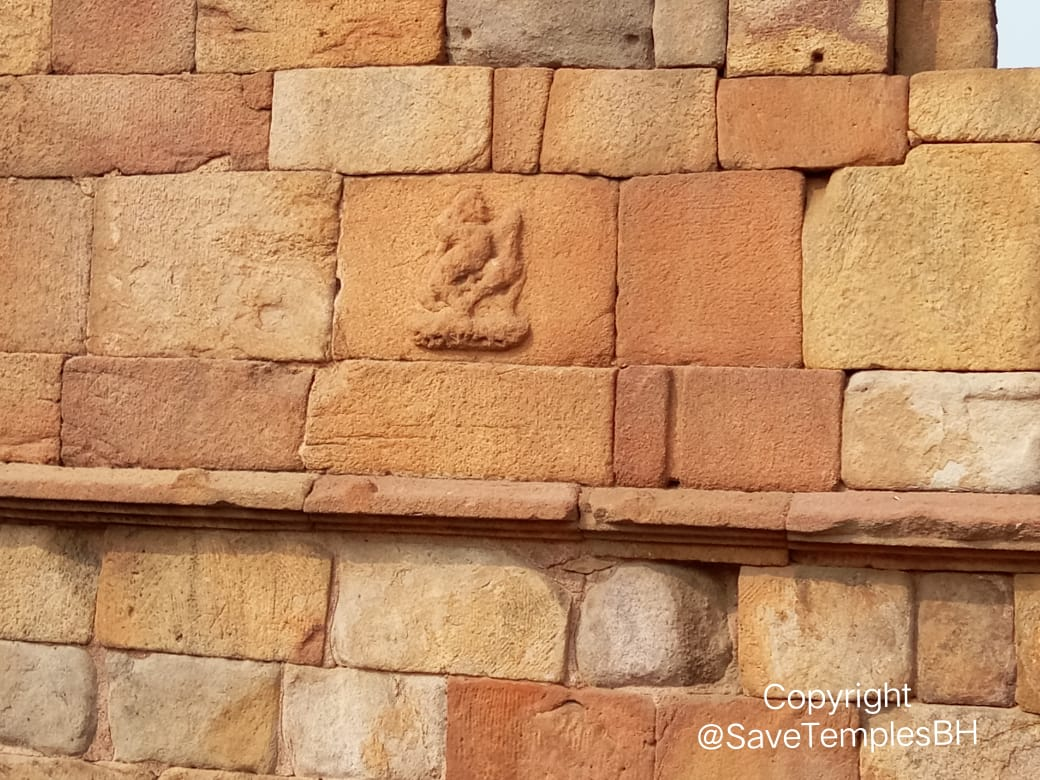
Remains of Hindu temple ruins in Qutb Minar

A map of the Qutb complex (click to see large)

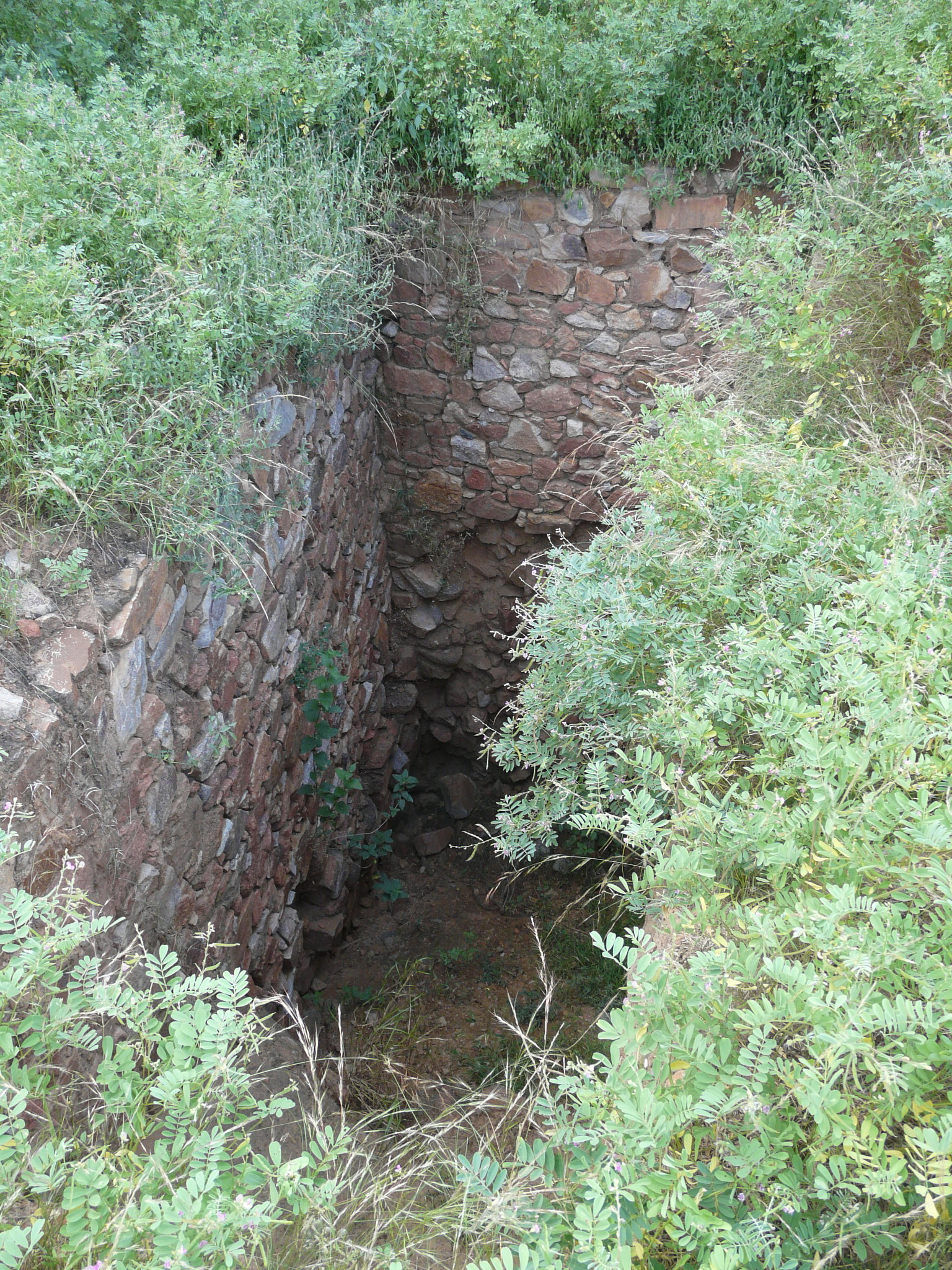
Ruins near Qutb Minar

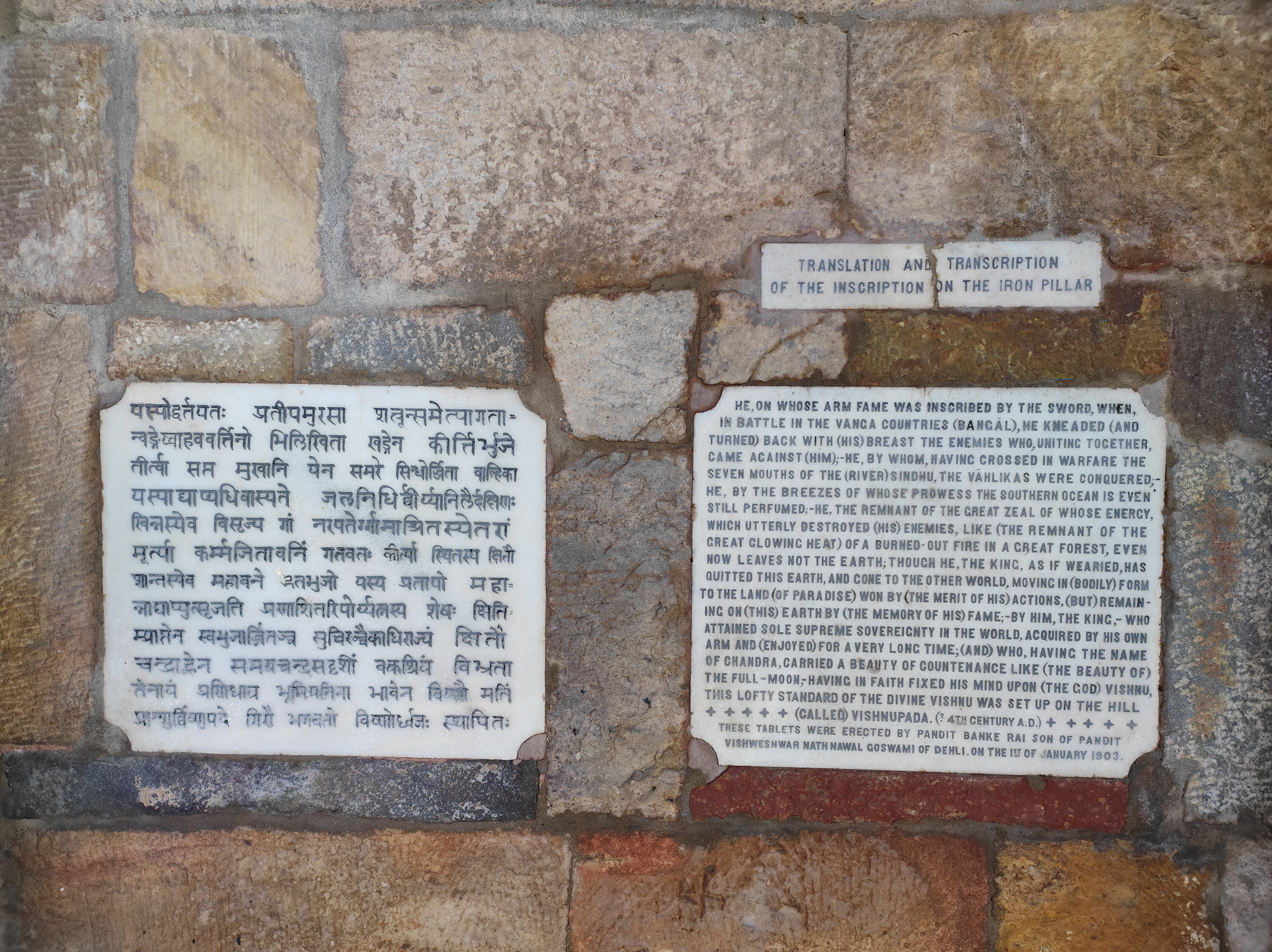
Translation of iron pillar inscription

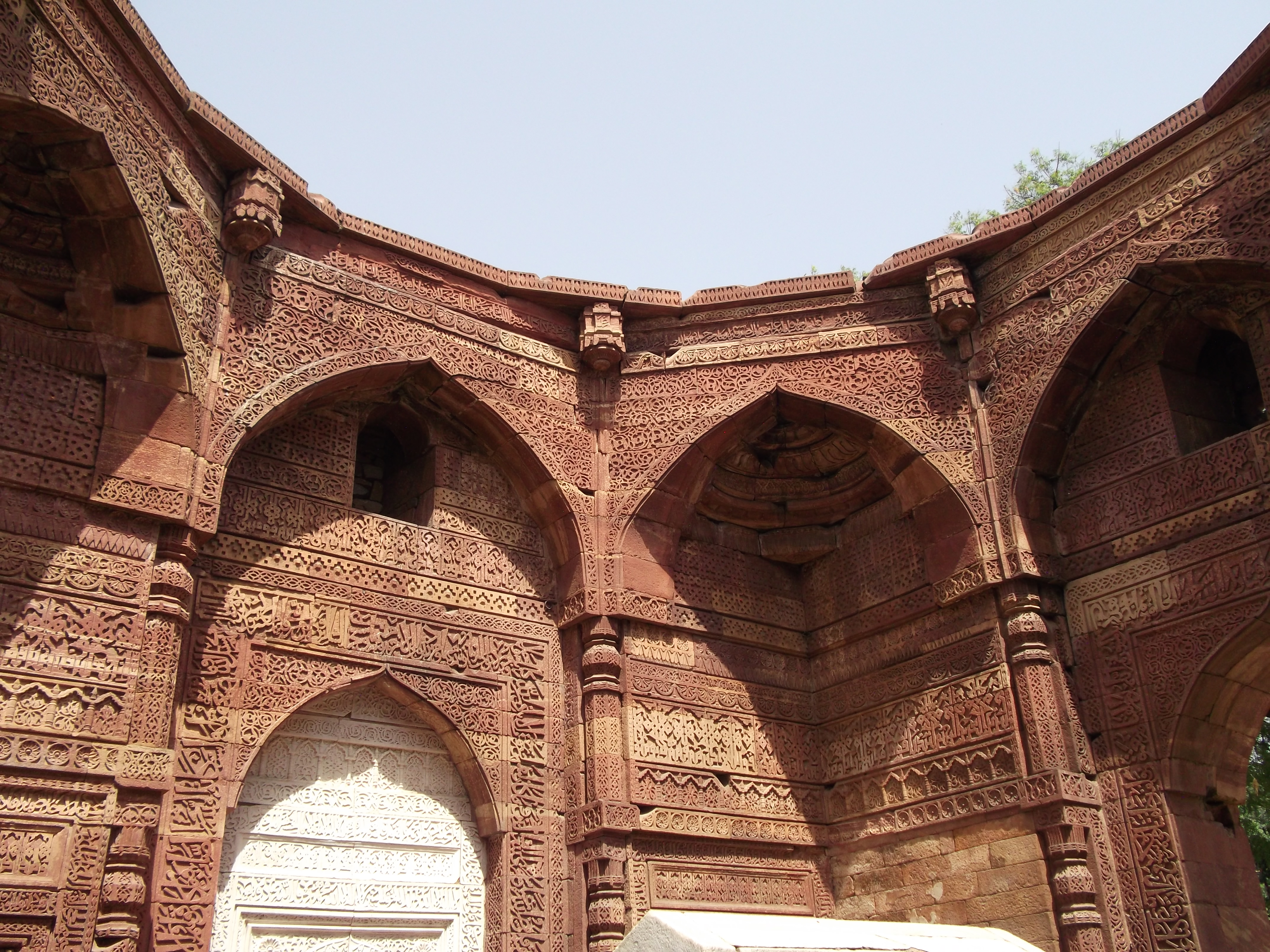
Tomb of Iltutmish

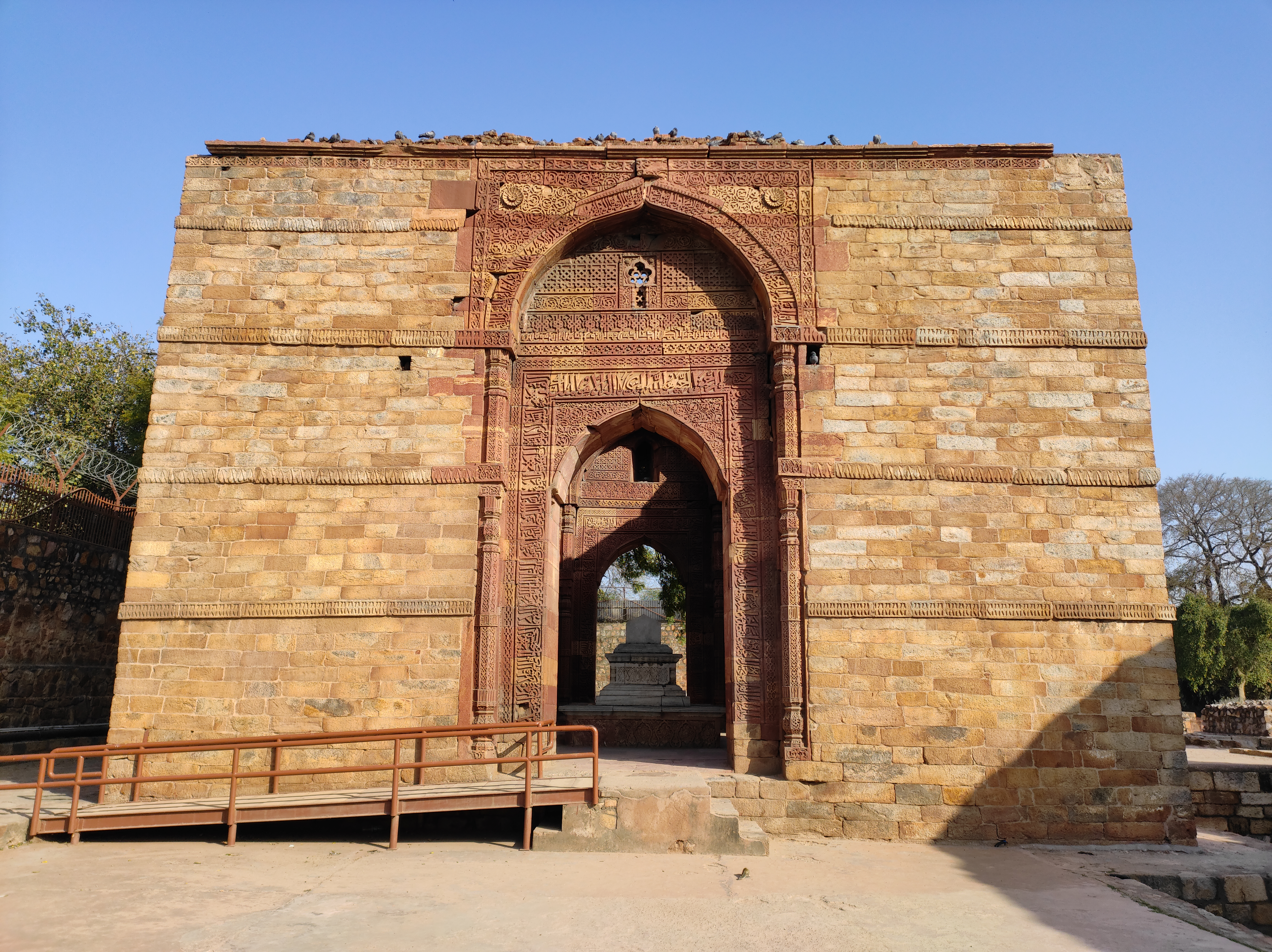
Tomb of Iltutmish

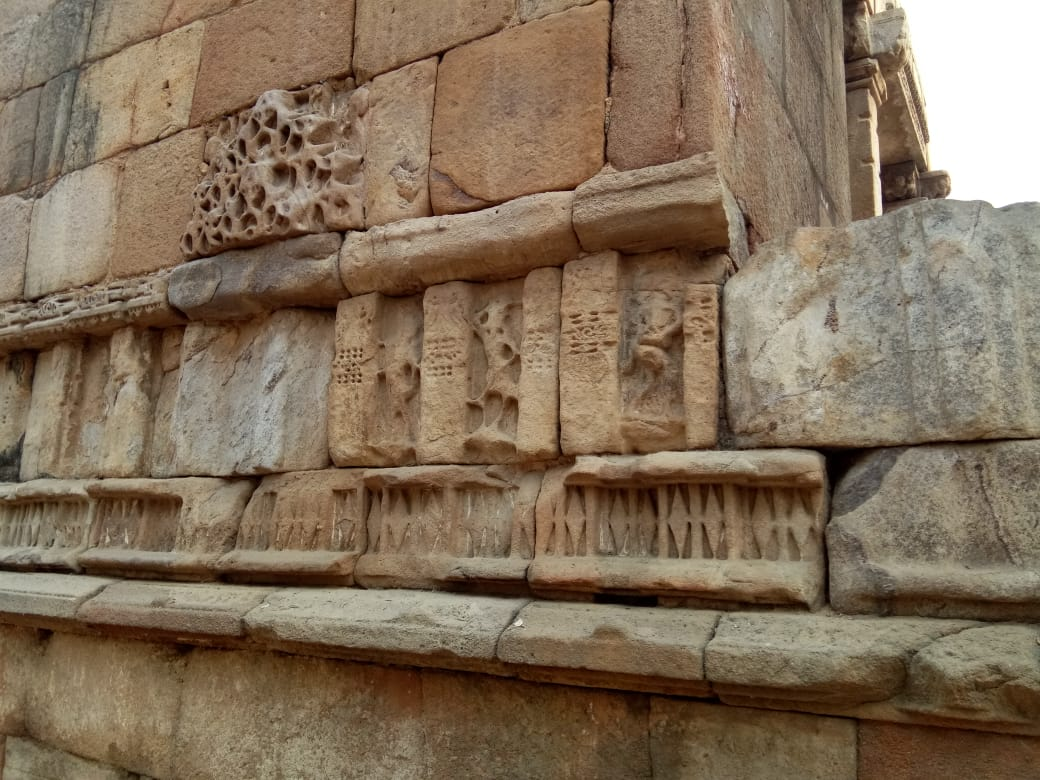
Ruins of Hindu temple in Qutb Minar

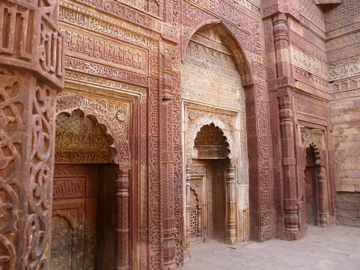
Interior of Tomb of Iltutmish

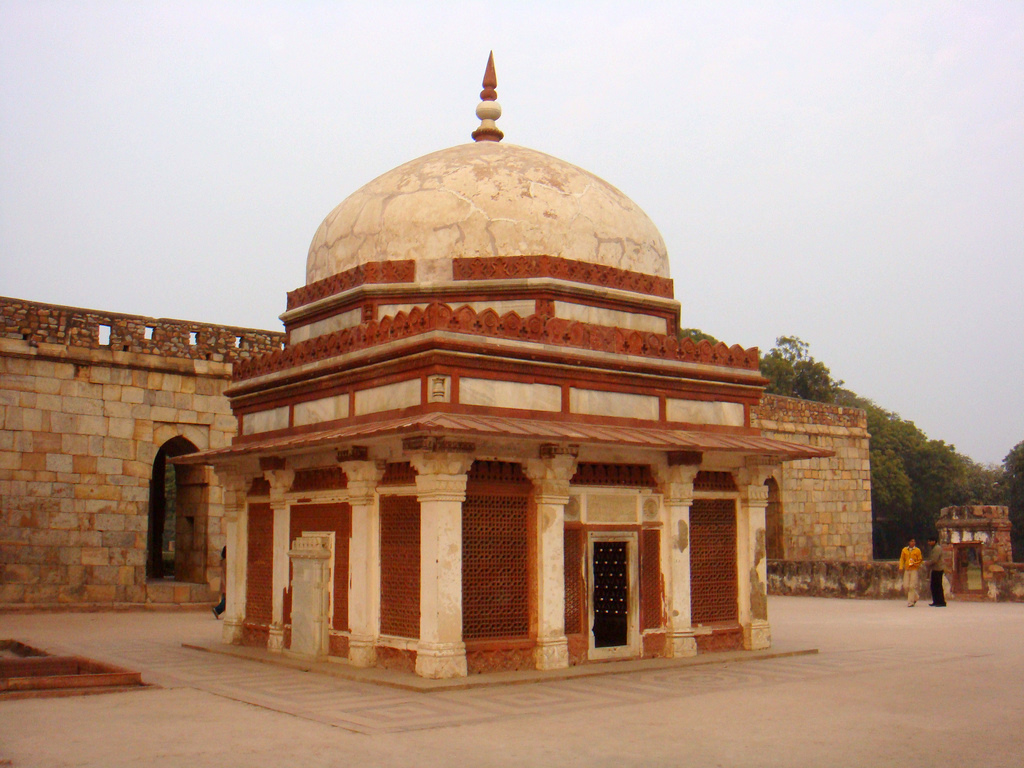
Tomb of Imam Zamin, Qutb Minar Complex

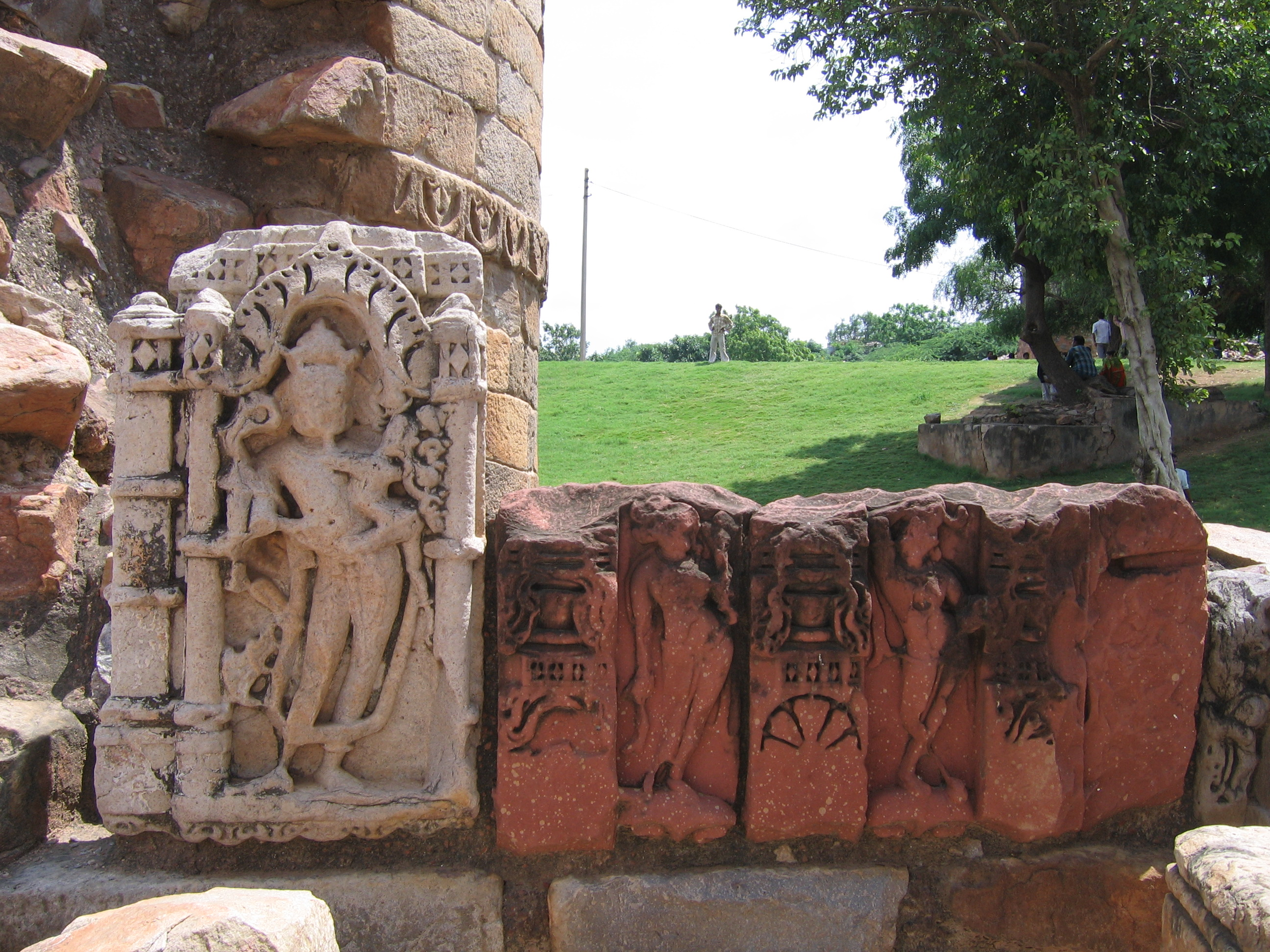
Statues from the destroyed Hindu temples

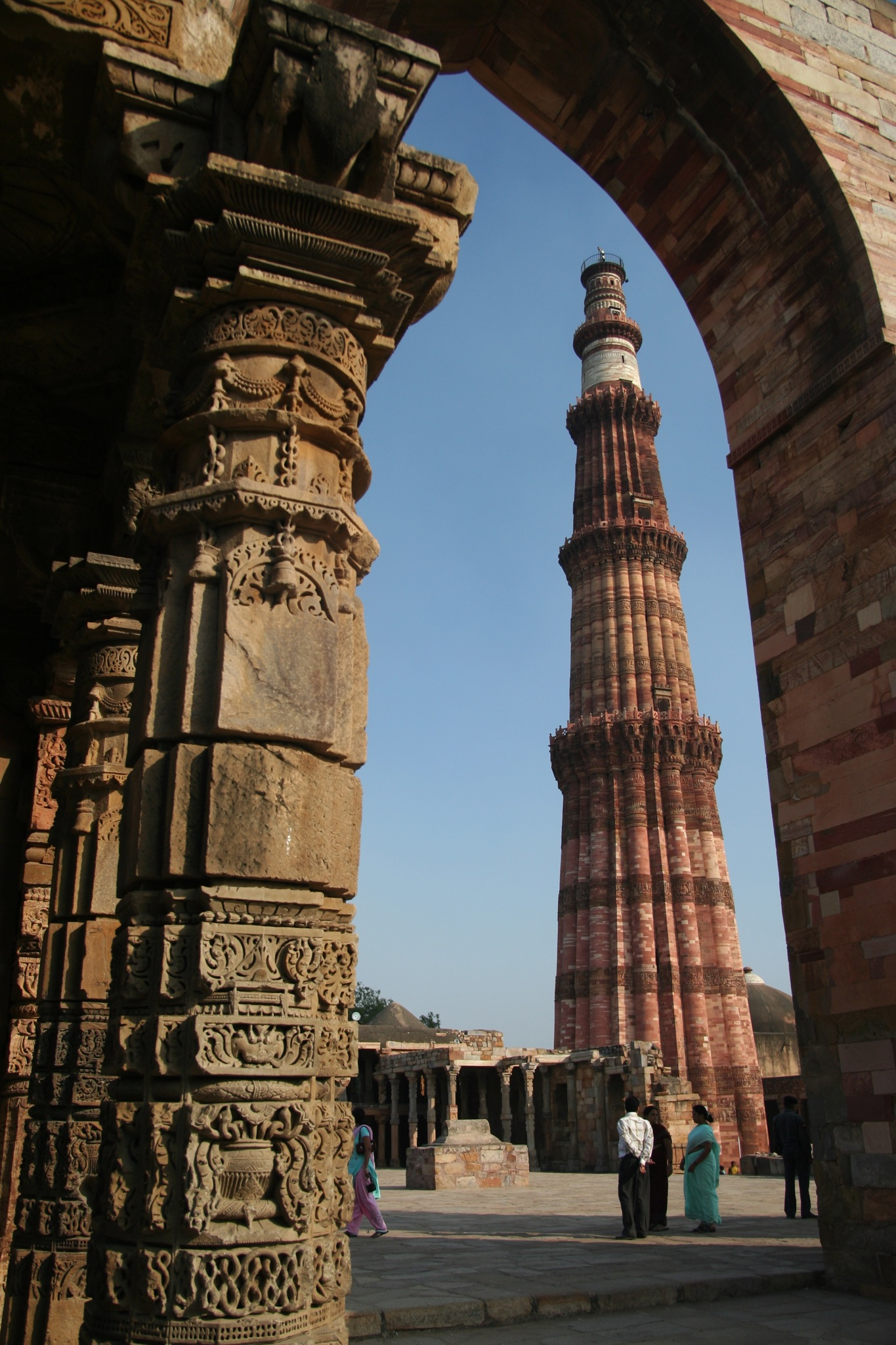
View of Qutb Minar

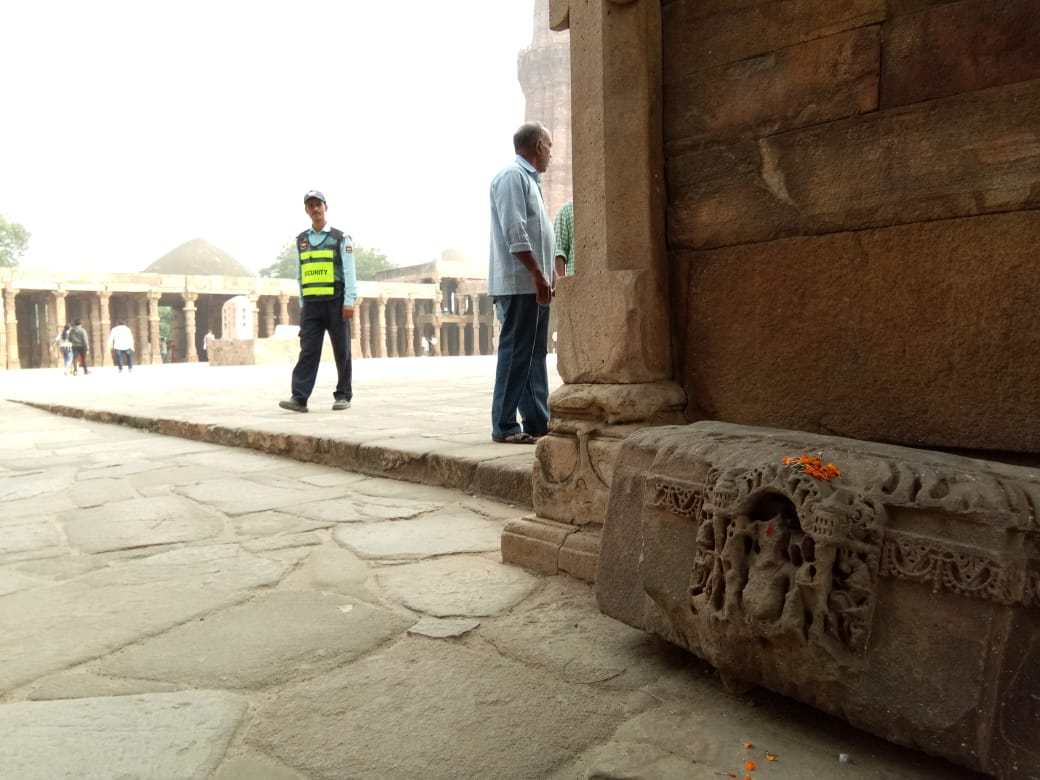
Ganesha idol in Qutb Minar

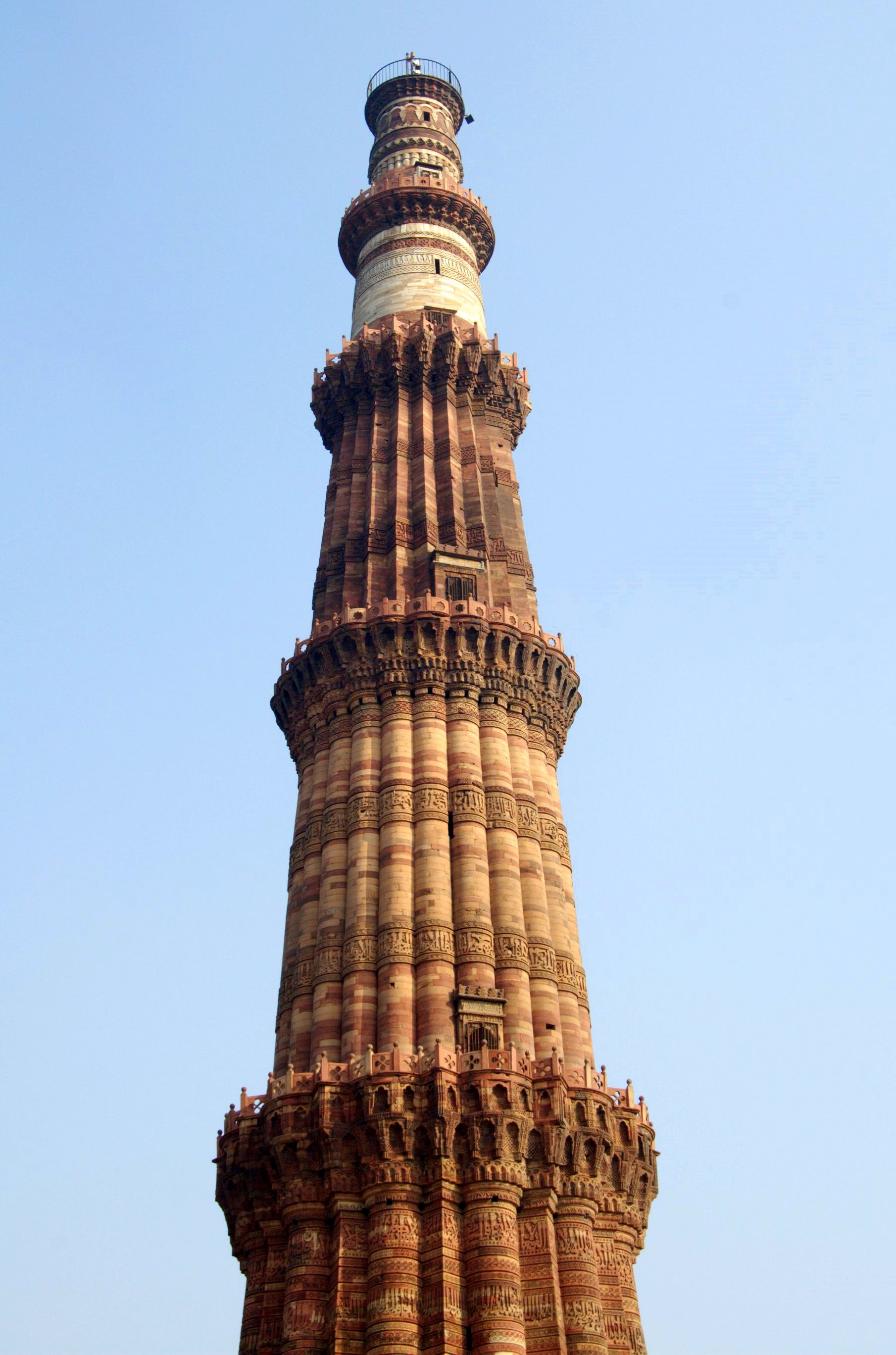
Upper stories of Qutb Minar, in white marble and sandstone

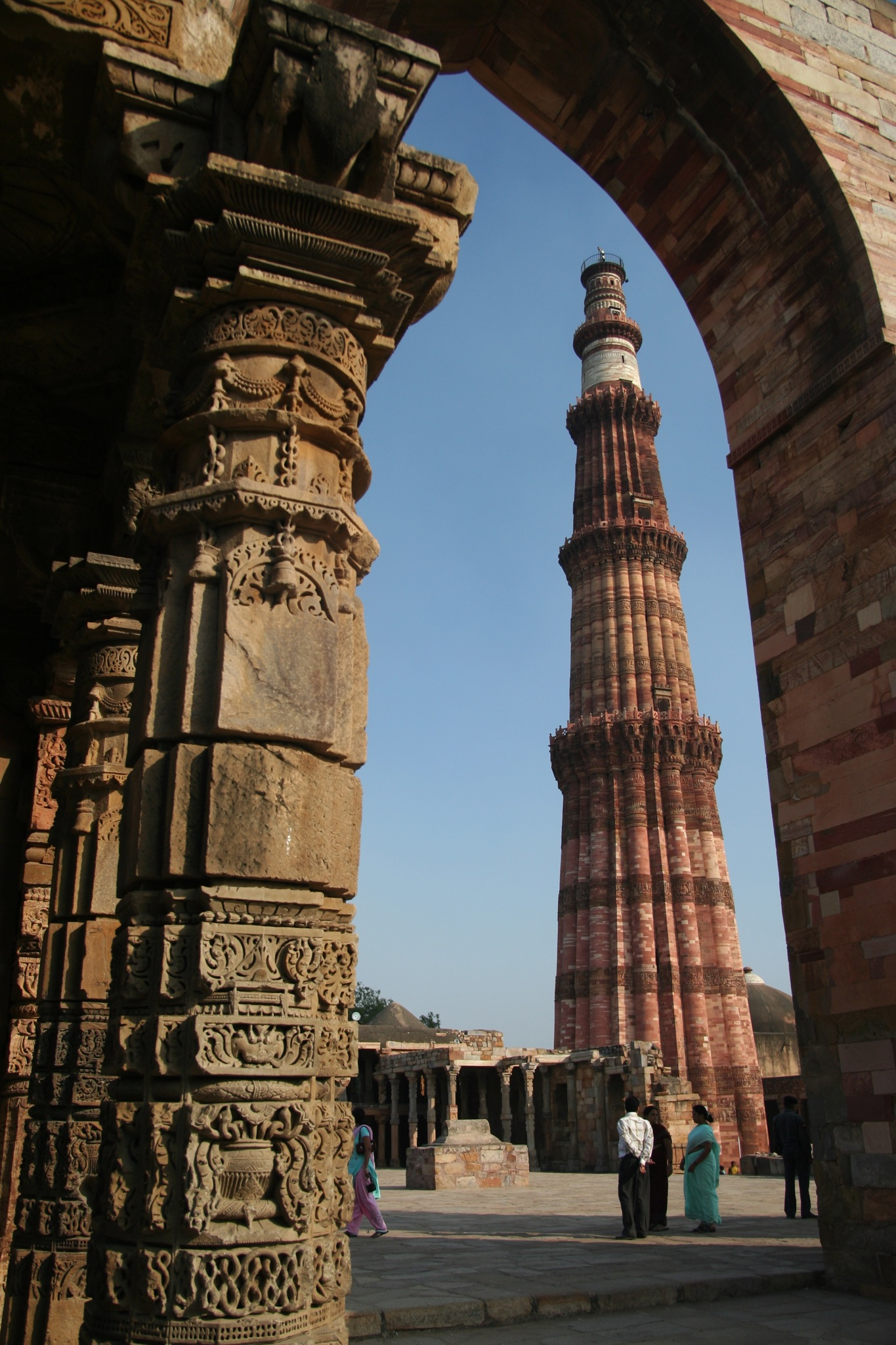
Another view of Qutb Minar, with a Hindu temple reused pillar in view

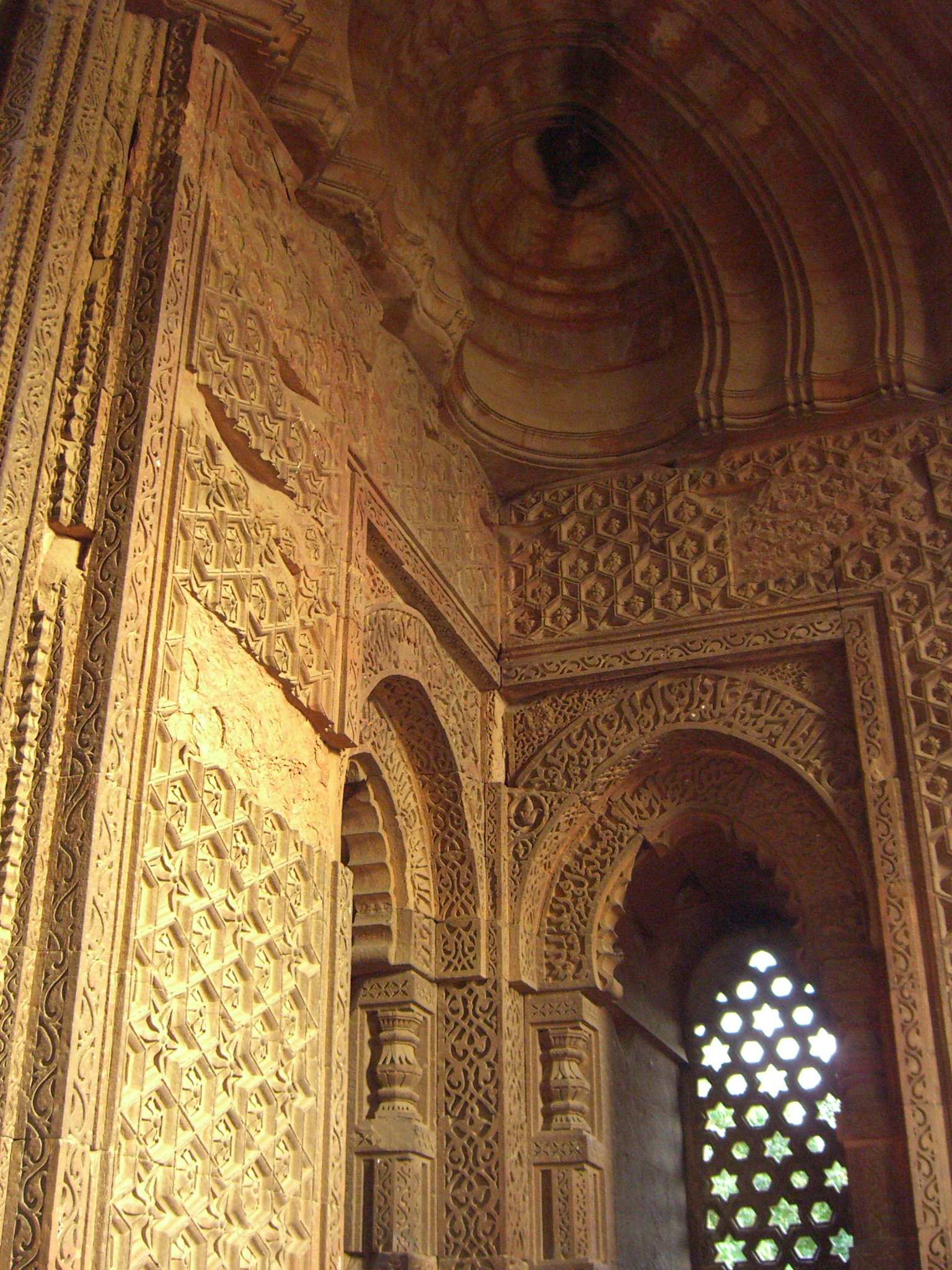
Interior of Alai Darwaza, resembling Timber ornamentation, Qutb complex

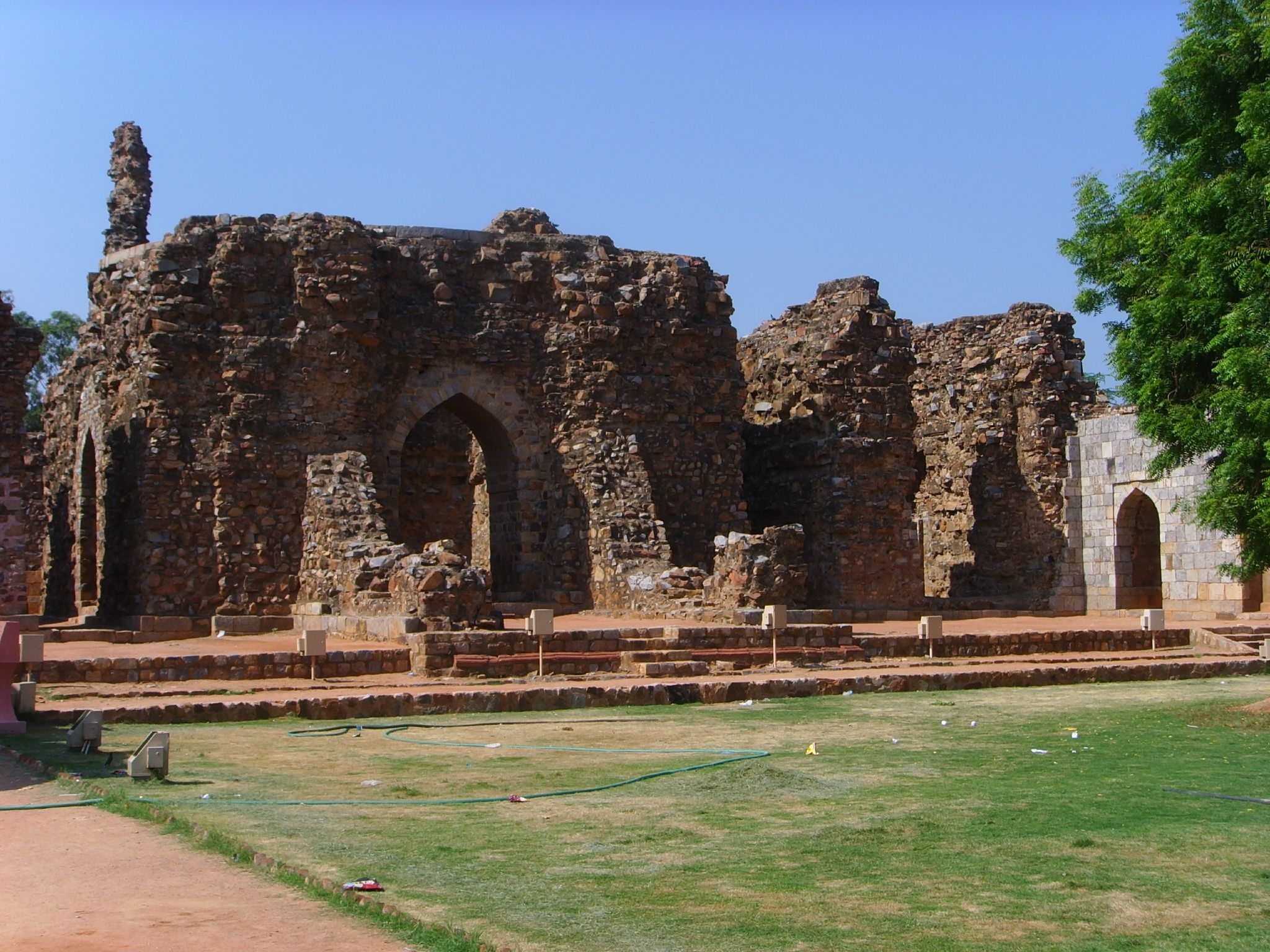
Tomb of Alauddin Khalji, Qutb Minar complex

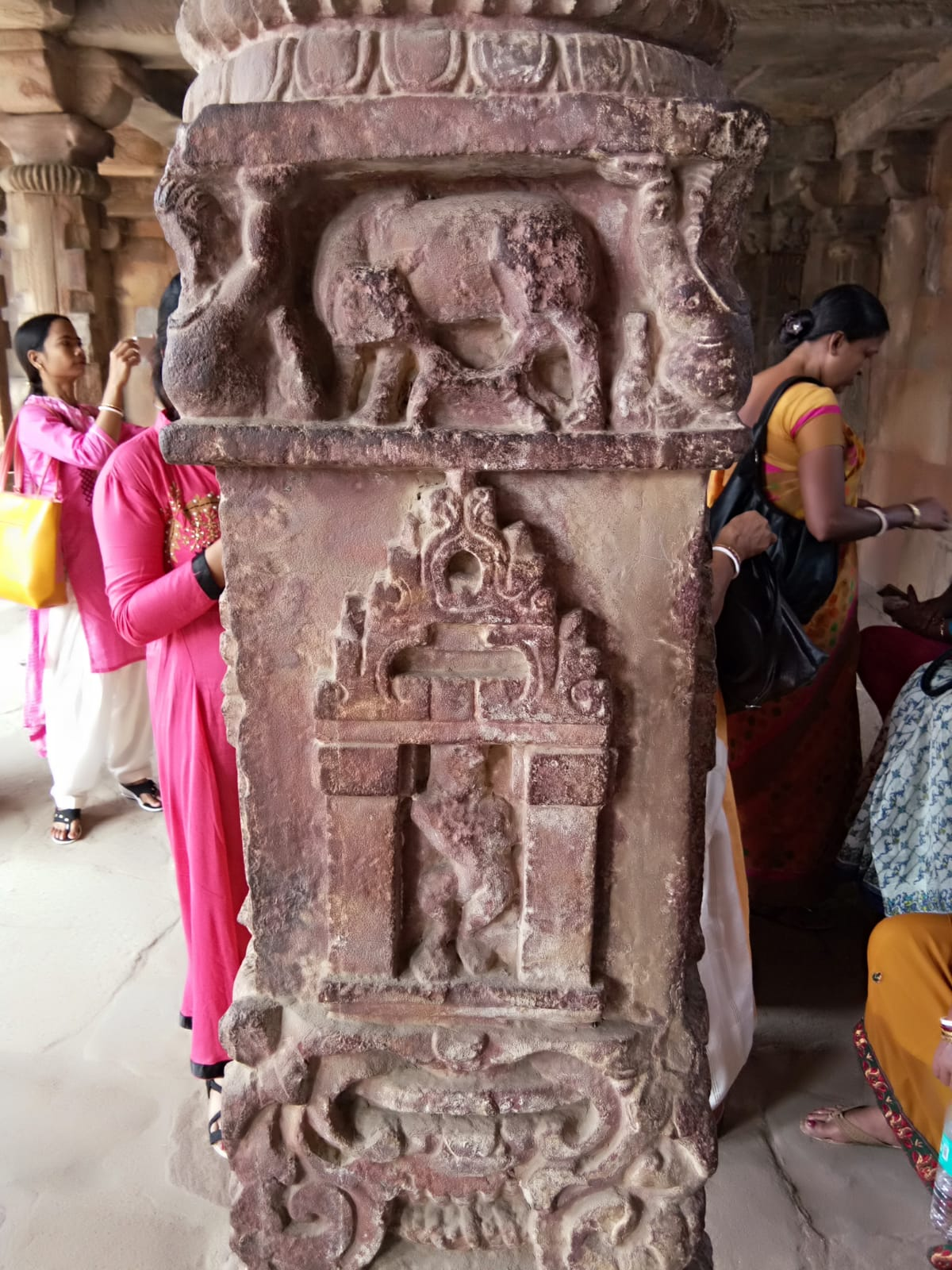
An idol of cow with her calf while another layer has defaced idol of Krishna

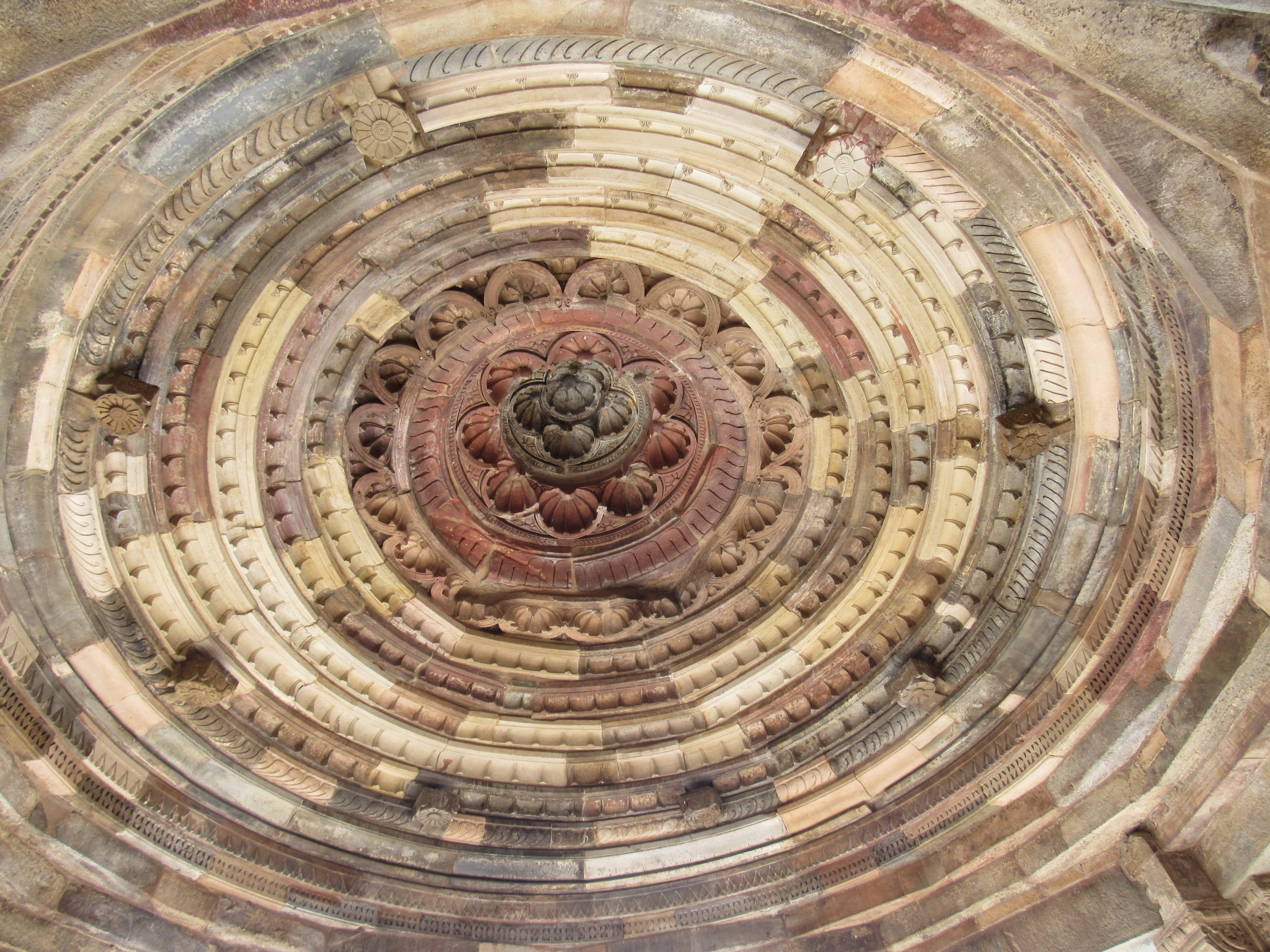
Dome interior

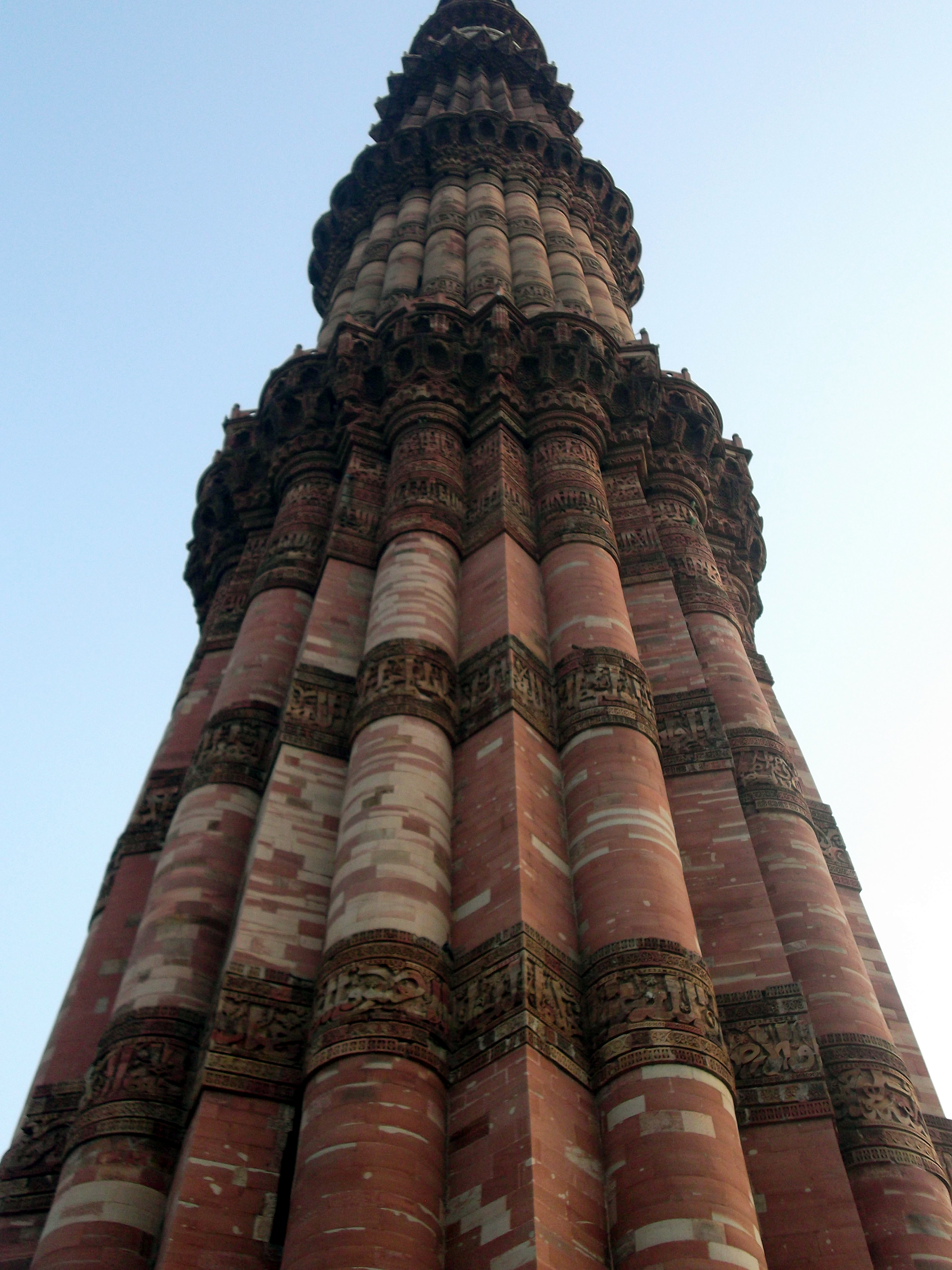
The Qutb Minar, looking up from its foot

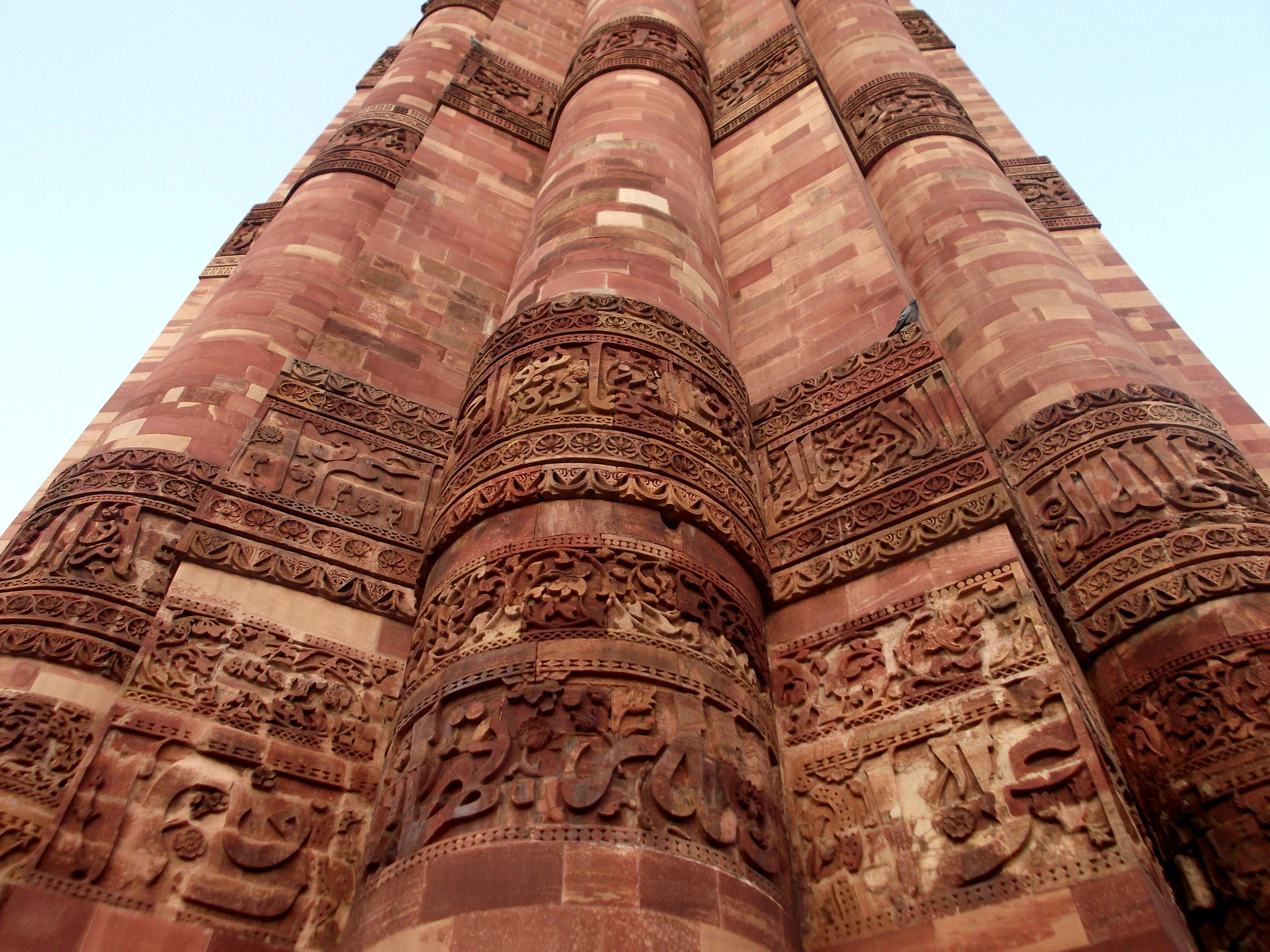
Quran verses written on the exteriors of the Qutb Minar

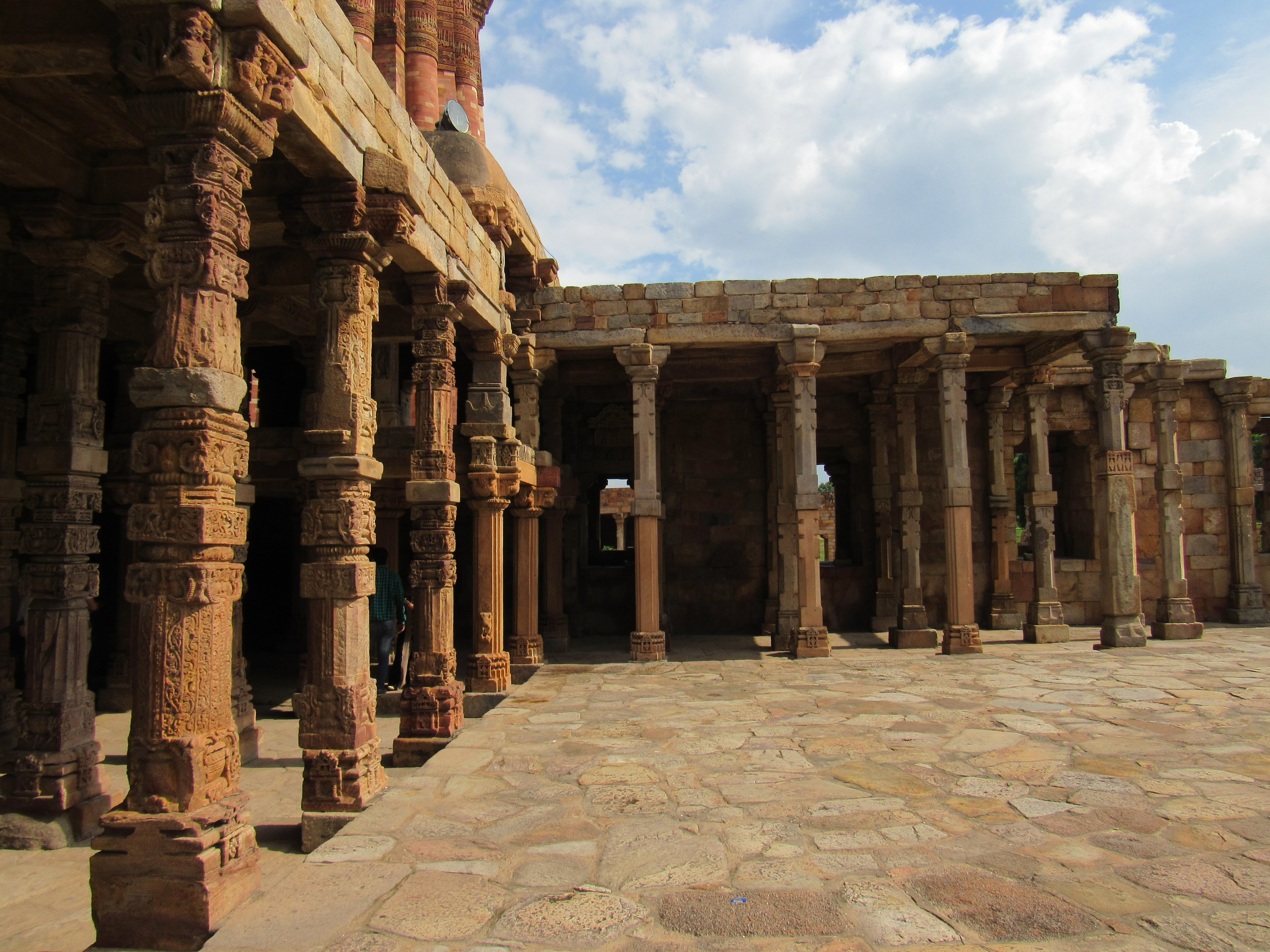
Architectures of Qutb Complex

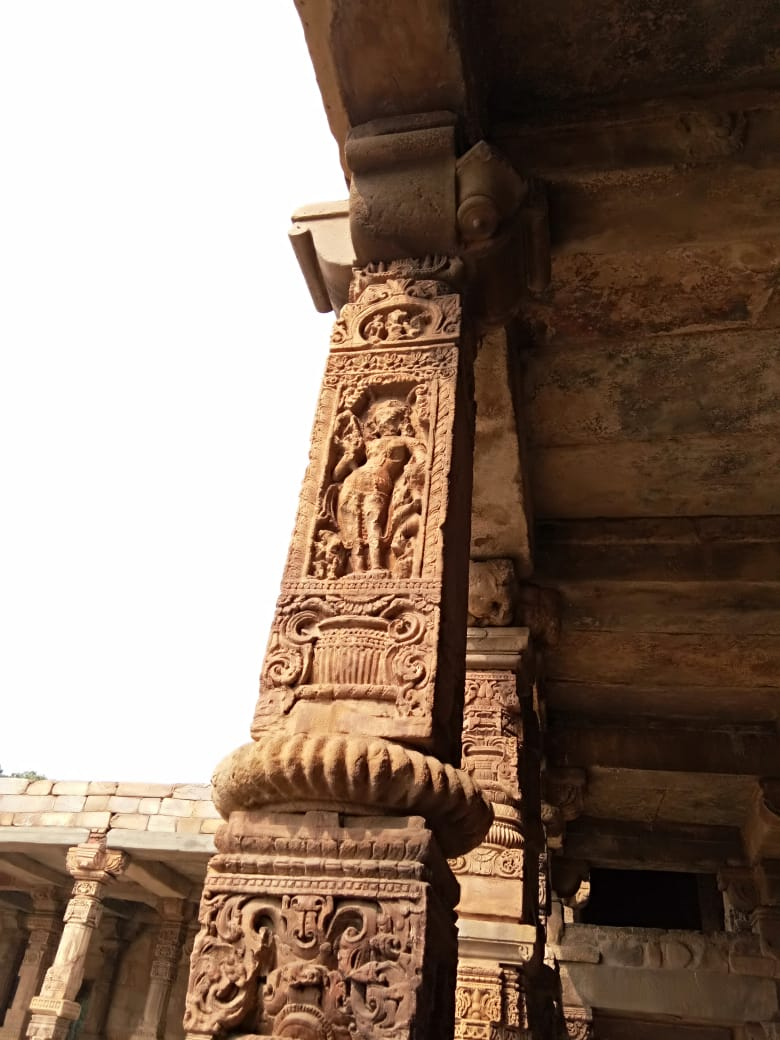
Ancient ruins of Hindu temple, with figure of a female dancer inside the Quwwat-ul Islam mosque

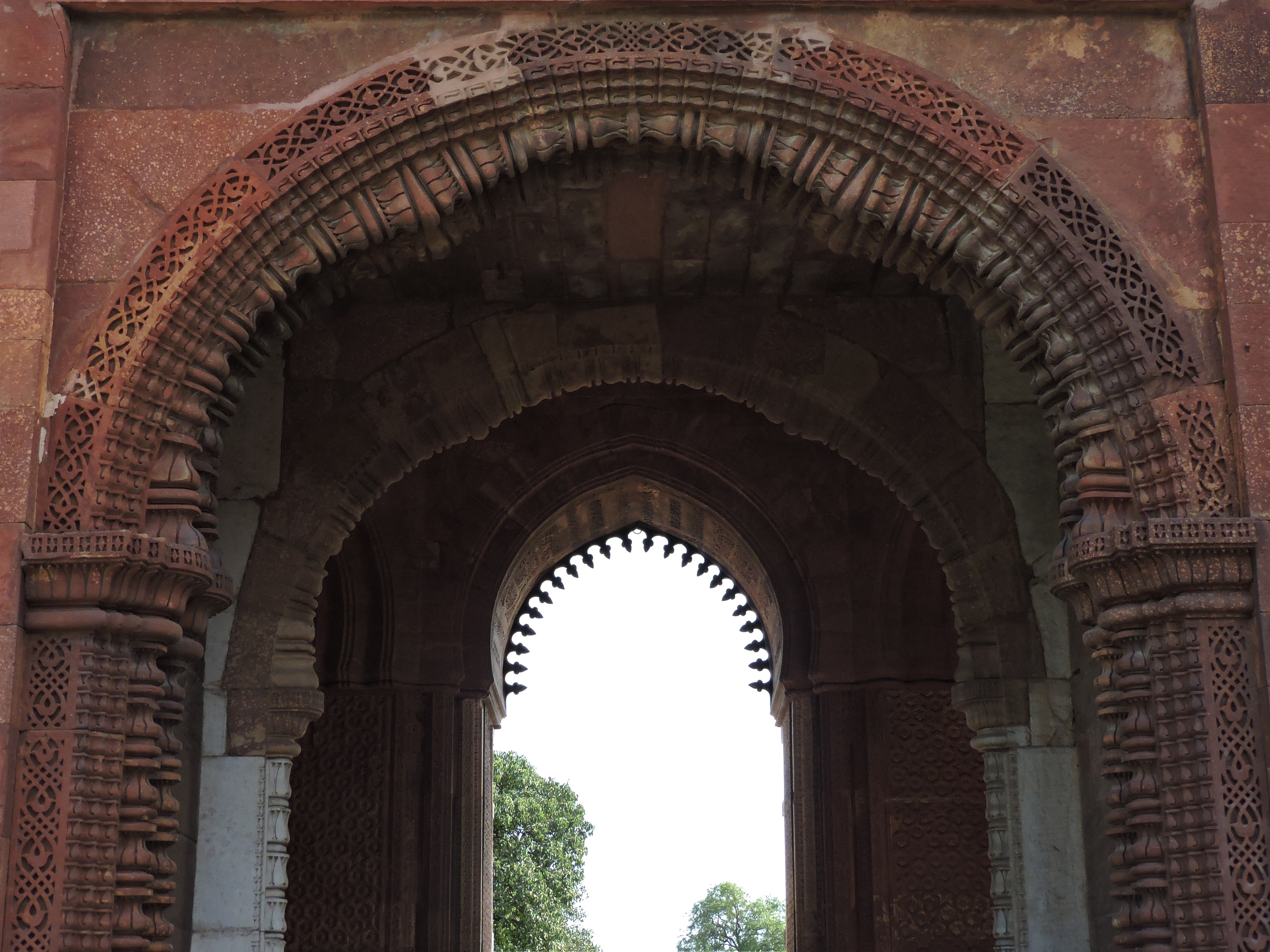
Alai Darwaza Arch Carvings

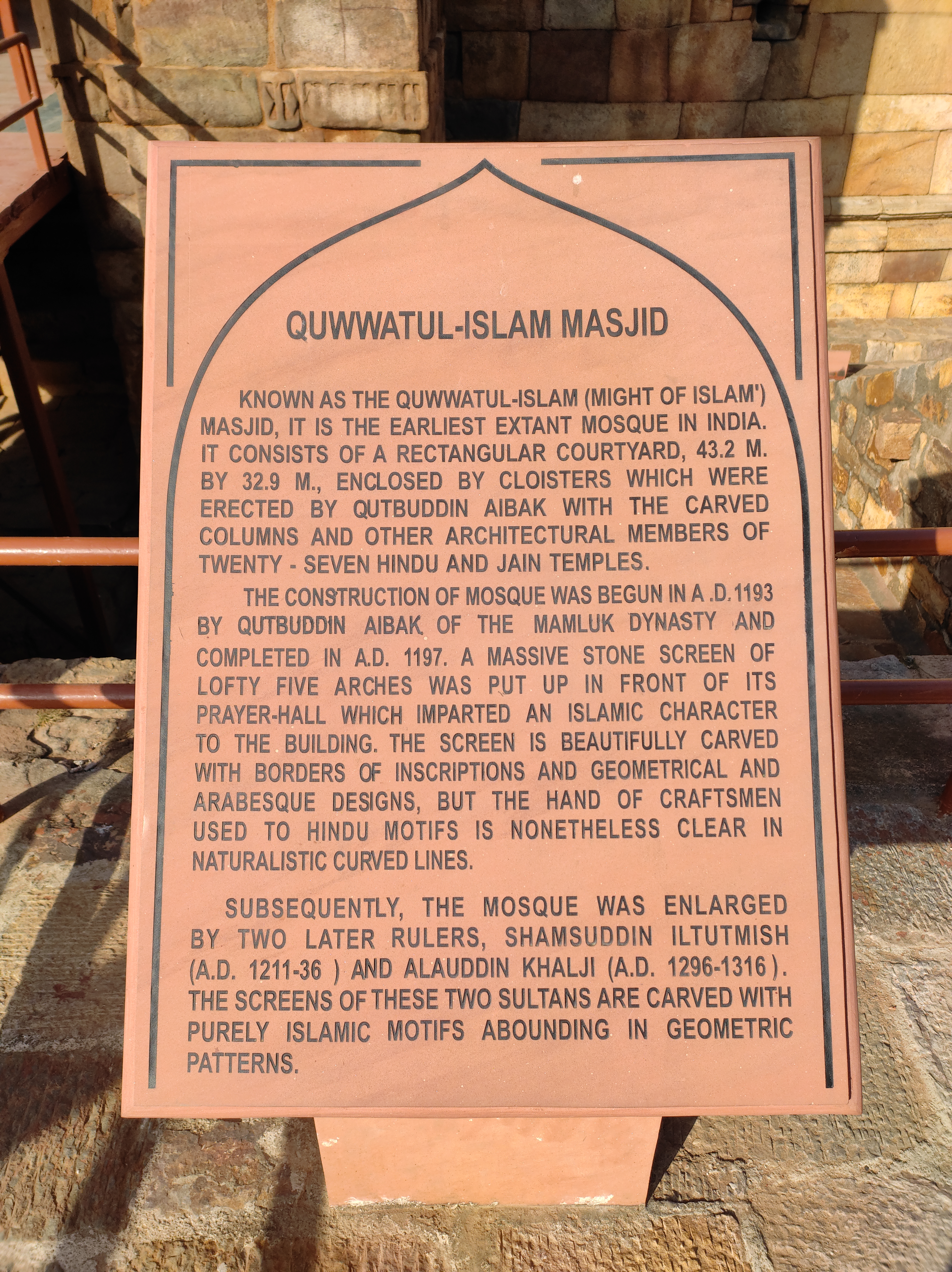
Plaque at the entrance providing visitors a background of Quwwat-ul-Islam Masjid

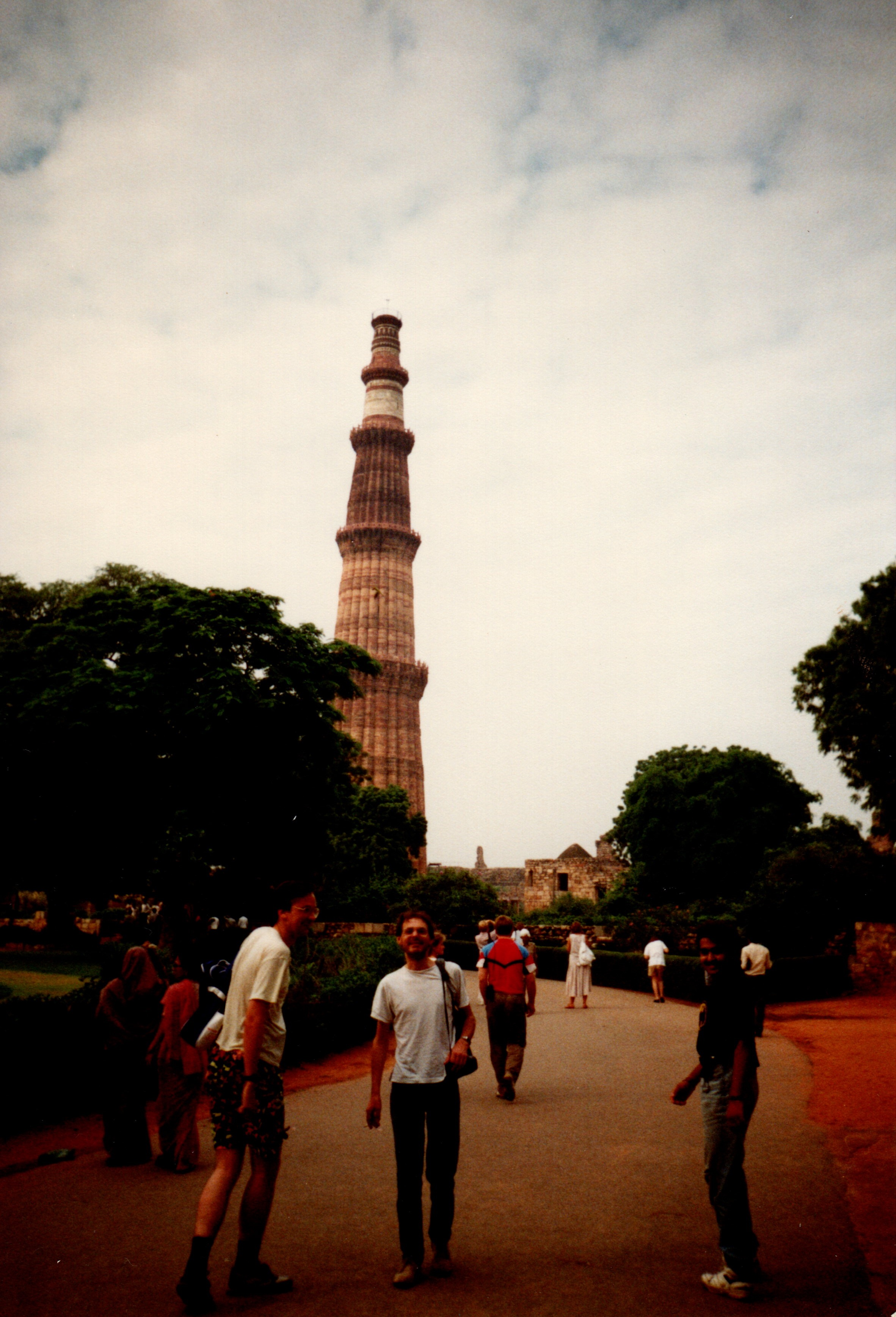
Qutb Minar path view

== See also ==
- Islam in India
- List of mosques in India
- Mehrauli Archaeological Park
