= Gordon Sanderson =

British Indian archeologist (1886–1915)

Gordon Sanderson (1886 – 13 October 1915) was an officer with the Archaeological Survey of India (ASI) and held the position of the Superintendent, Mahomedan and British Monuments, Northern Circle. He is best known for his work in preserving and documenting the historical monuments of India. Sanderson also wrote books on Indian monuments including Delhi Fort: A Guide to the Buildings and Gardens, Conservation Notes on Archaeological Buildings in Delhi Province, The Arts and Antiquities of India: An Illustrated Selection.

At the peak of his career with the ASI, Sanderson decided to fight for Britain when the First World War broke out. He took charge as Lieutenant of 2nd King Edward VII's Own Gurkha Rifles (The Sirmoor Rifles). On 13 October 1915, aged 28, Lieutenant Gordon Sanderson was killed in action in France. He was buried in the Gorre British and Indian Cemetery, at Pas de Calais, northern France.

In recognition of his work with the Archaeological Survey of India, a monument was erected at the Qutb Complex, New Delhi in 1919. The monument, a white marble sundial, was installed by his colleagues from ASI. Sanderson had carried out extensive excavations in the area around Qutub Minar starting in 1910 AD. He is credited with making the Qutub Minar complex what it is today.
