= Zafar Mahal (Mehrauli) =

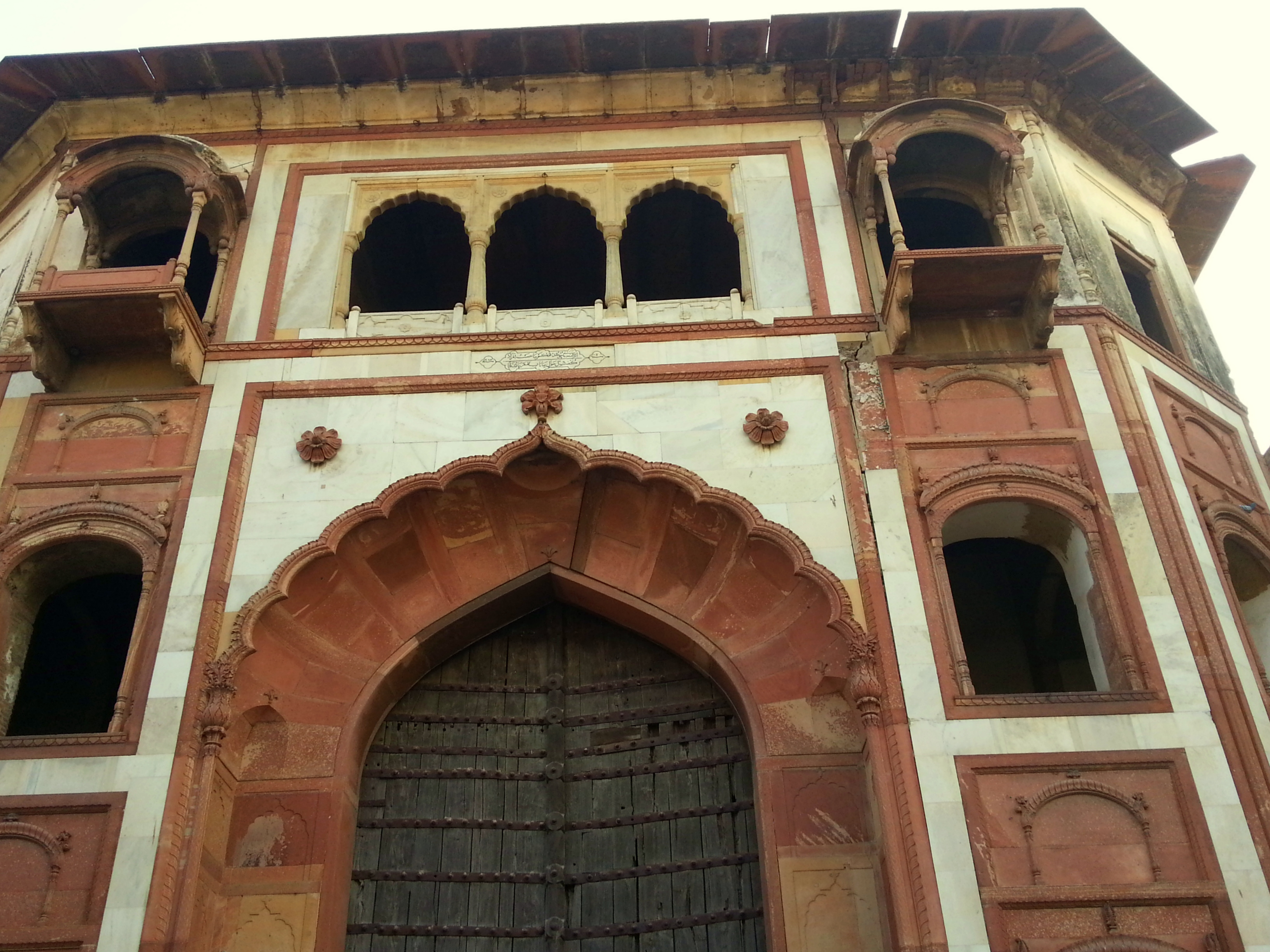
- Zafar Gate of Zafar Mahal

- Location within India

General information
- Architectural style: Mughal Architecture
- Location: Delhi, India
- Coordinates: 28.5158°N 77.1775°E
- Completed: 19th century
- Demolished: Ruins
- Client: Mughal dynasty

Design and construction
- Architects: Akbar Shah II and Bahadur Shah Zafar II

Zafar Mahal, in Mehrauli village, in South Delhi, India, is considered as the last monumental structure built as a summer palace during the fading years of the Mughal era. The building has two components namely, the Mahal or the palace, which was built first by Akbar Shah II in the 18th century, and the entrance gate that was reconstructed in the 19th century by Bahadur Shah Zafar II, popularly known as "Zafar" (the nom de plume of Bahadur Shah II) meaning ‘Victory’. It has a forlorn history because Bahadur Shah Zafar, who wished to be buried in the precincts of the Zafar Mahal (palace) and the famous Dargah of Khwaja Qutubuddin Bakhtiar Kaki in Mehrauli, Delhi, was deported by the British to Rangoon after the failed Revolt of 1857, where he died of old age. The monument today is in a neglected and ruined state, locals play cricket and gamble freely inside the protected monument. The 18th-century palace has been all but subsumed by unauthorised constructions.

== History ==
Zafar Mahal, is the ruined summer palace of the last Mughal Emperor, Bahadur Shah Zafar II. The Moghul dynasty, which started with the first Mughal Emperor Babur who conquered Delhi in 1526 AD ended after 332 years when on 7 October 1858 the last Emperor Bahadur Shah Zafar II (1837–1857) was tried for treason by the British and deported to Rangoon, Burma, now Myanmar from the imperial city of Delhi. The irony of this history is also that he travelled in a bullock cart, with a group of British Lancers escorting him.

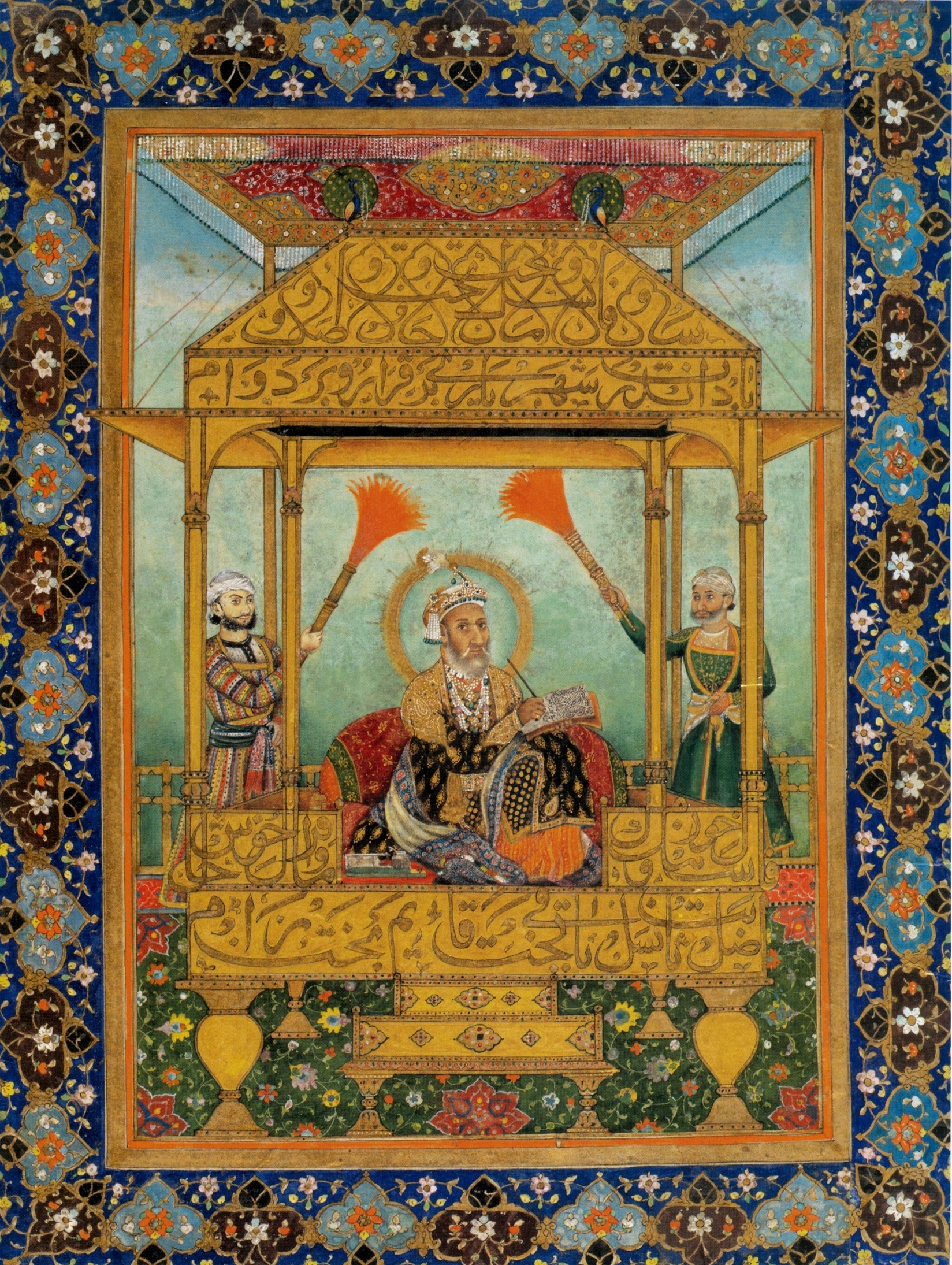
Portrait of Bahadur Shah Zafar, the Last Mughal emperor of India.

The graves in Mehrauli in the precincts of Zafar Mahal, built within a marble screen enclosure by Jahandar Shah for his father Bahadur Shah I and others who followed, is a minor reflection of the history of the place. Shah Alam II who had the misfortune of being blinded by Ghulam Qadir, the Rohilla leader was buried here. He was considered a "puppet ruler", first under the Marathas and later under the British. His son Akbar Shah II was also buried here. Mirza Fakruddin son of the last emperor Bahadur Shah Zafar, who died early ushered the end of the Moghul regime, was also buried here. But Bahadur Shah Zafar who had identified the location for his grave (sardgha – the vacant land for burial) was the most unfortunate (ill-fated) as he was deported to Rangoon and was buried there.

The exiled emperor died in November 1862. He was buried with great urgency in the night itself with "lantern light" in presence of his few family members under the direction of a British officer. The grave was initially unmarked but later a Tablet was erected at the location but only in the 20th century. His mazar (grave) has at last become a shrine and the local Burmese and also visitors from India and Pakistan consider him a Pir (saint). It is also said that the nationalist leader of India, founder of the Indian National Army, Subhas Chandra Bose took a formal oath at this grave to free India from foreign rule.

== Structure ==
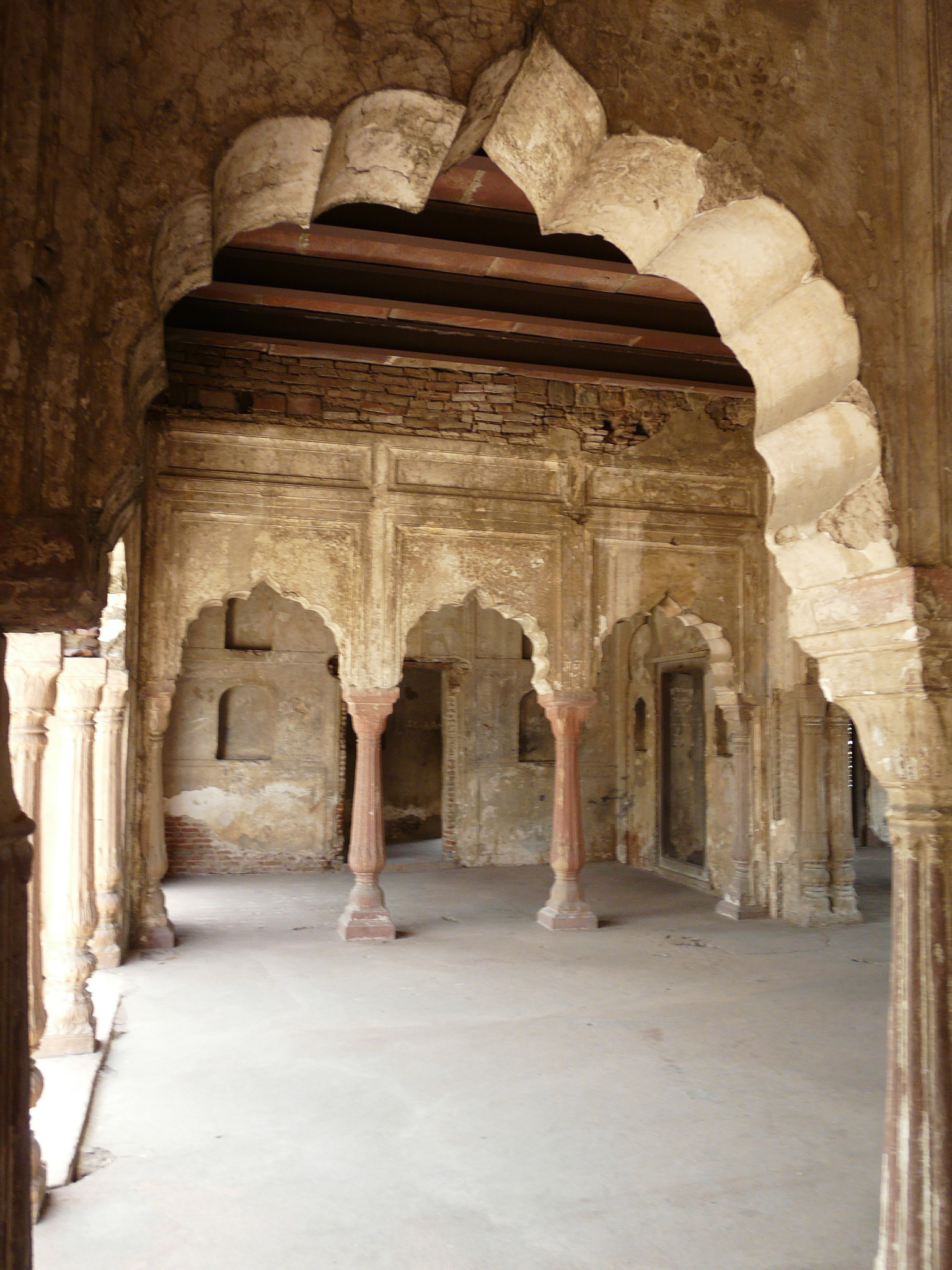
Multichambered dalan with a terrace

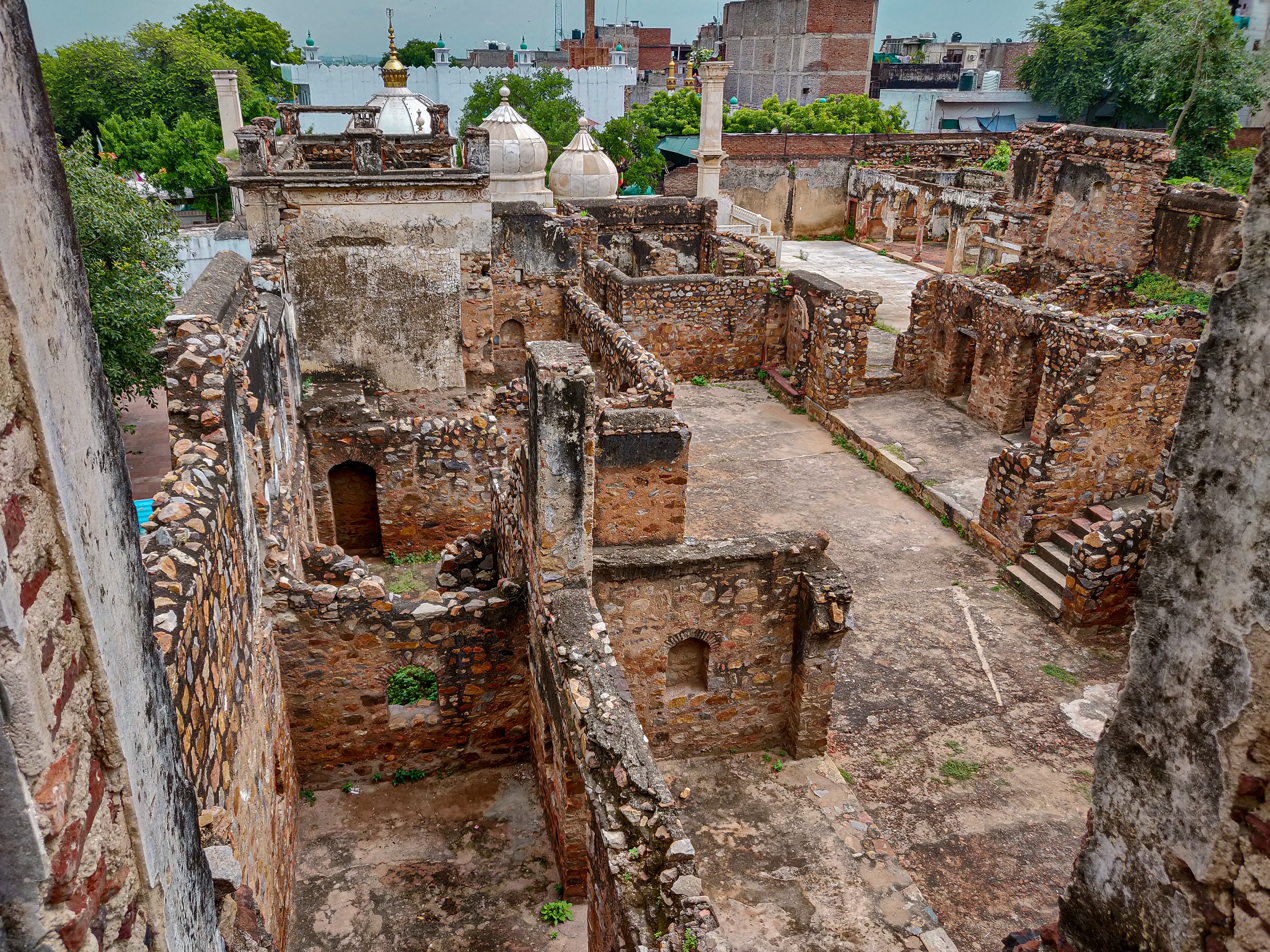
Ruins of the palace with the three white domes of Moti Masjid and Dargah of Qutubuddin Bakhtiar Kaki (left) in the background

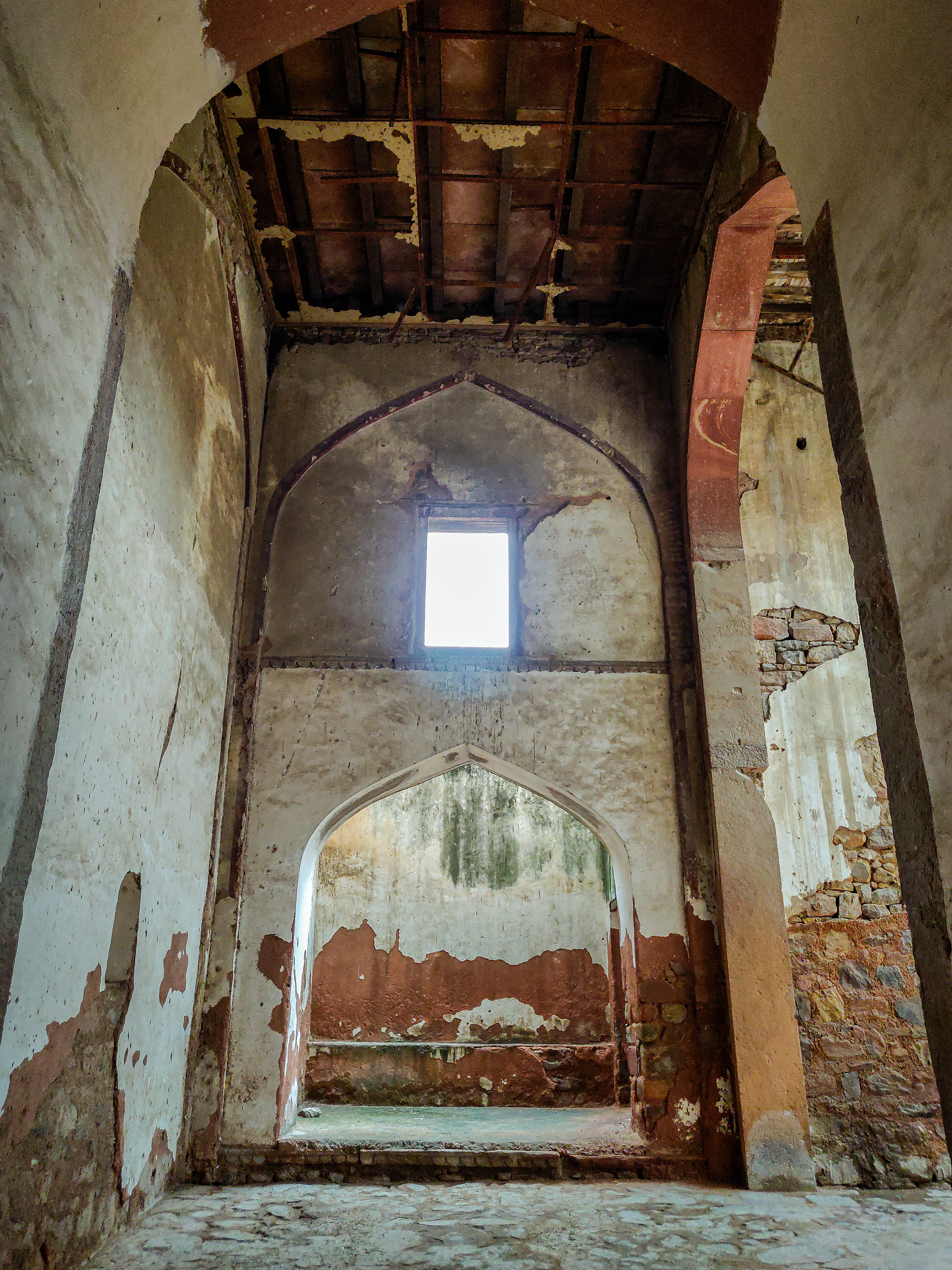
Inside the Hathi Gate of Zafar Mahal

The palace, located at about 300 feet (91 m) to the west of Ajmeri Gate of the dargah of Khwaja Kaki has an imposing gate. It was built in 1842 by Akbar Shah II. Built as a three-storied structure in red sandstone embellished with marble, it is around 50 feet (15 m) wide with a gate opening called the Hathi gate (built to allow full decorated elephants with the howdah to pass through) is of 11.75 feet (4 m) opening at the entrance. An inscription on the main arch credits building of the gate (as an entry gate to the existing Mahal) by Bahadur Shah II in the eleventh year of his accession as Emperor in 1847-48 AD. A broad Chhajja (cantilevered projection) built in the Mughal style is a striking feature of the arch. At the entrance gate, the logo has small projecting windows flanked by curved and covered Bengali domes. On both sides of the arch, two ornate medallions in the form of large lotuses have been provided. The gateway also depicts a classic tripolia or three-arch opening into the baaraadaree or 12 opening structure, which fully draws the breeze. In the top floor of the palace, there is multi chambered dalan (arcade room with one open side overlooking a courtyard), which has terrace on the palace side and with a view of the entrance at the other end.

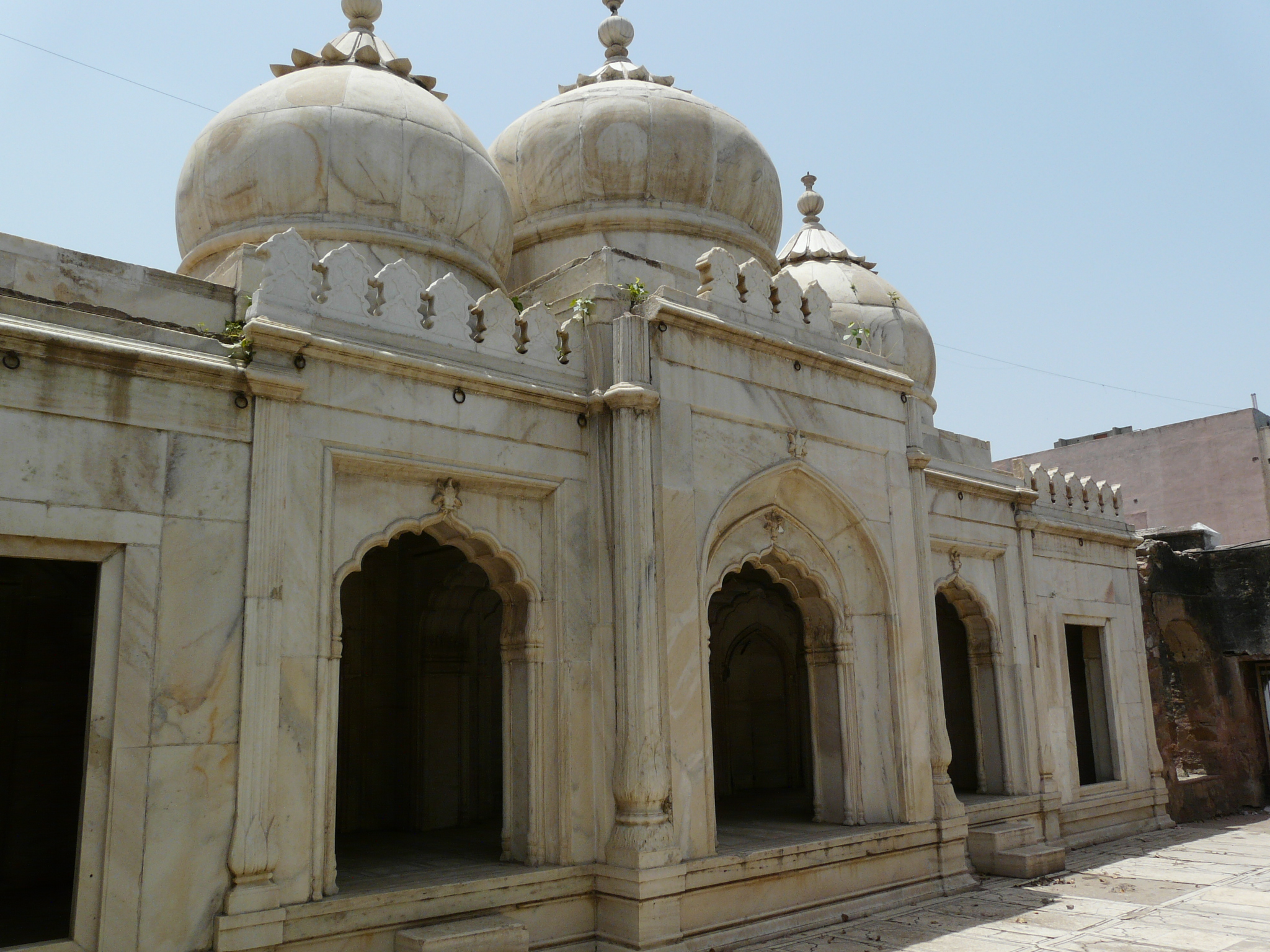
Moti Masjid, Mehrauli, built by Bahadur Shah I.

A mosque called the Moti Masjid (pearl mosque), built by Bahadur Shah I (d.1712), was a private mosque of the royal family, which has now been subsumed within the palace precincts. The mosque is a small and unique three-domed structure made of white marble. Its construction is also credited to Bahadur Shah. The austere mosque has the mihrab on the west direction of prayer but is unusually not embellished, except for little border of floral carving on the south at the top edge of a dado.

The Chhatta Chawk or vaulted arcade design of the Lahore gate at the Red Fort in Delhi has provided the basic design that was replicated for the Zafar gate. It is a large covered passage (arcade) with arched apartments on either side. The arcade, which has rooms within its enclosures, located just after the entrance of the gate, is two directional; one runs towards south, and the other is to the east. The palace, situated a few steps down the arcade, is now in a dilapidated condition. Its restoration is limited by the inadequate documents to deduce the original construction details. The Archaeological Survey of India document titled "List of Mohammedan and Hindu Monuments" of March 1920 provides only sketchy details.

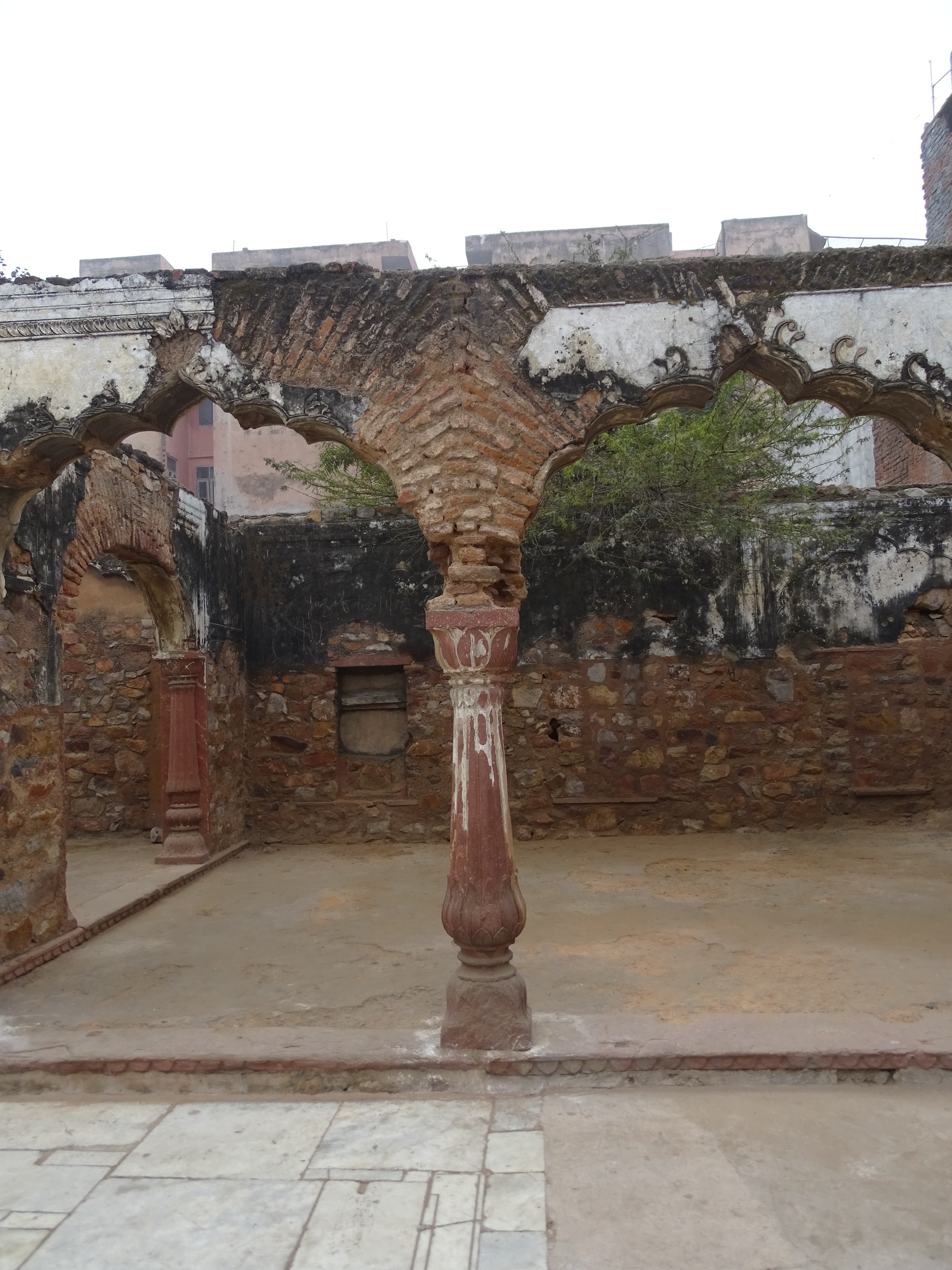
A decaying pillar inside Zafar Mahal

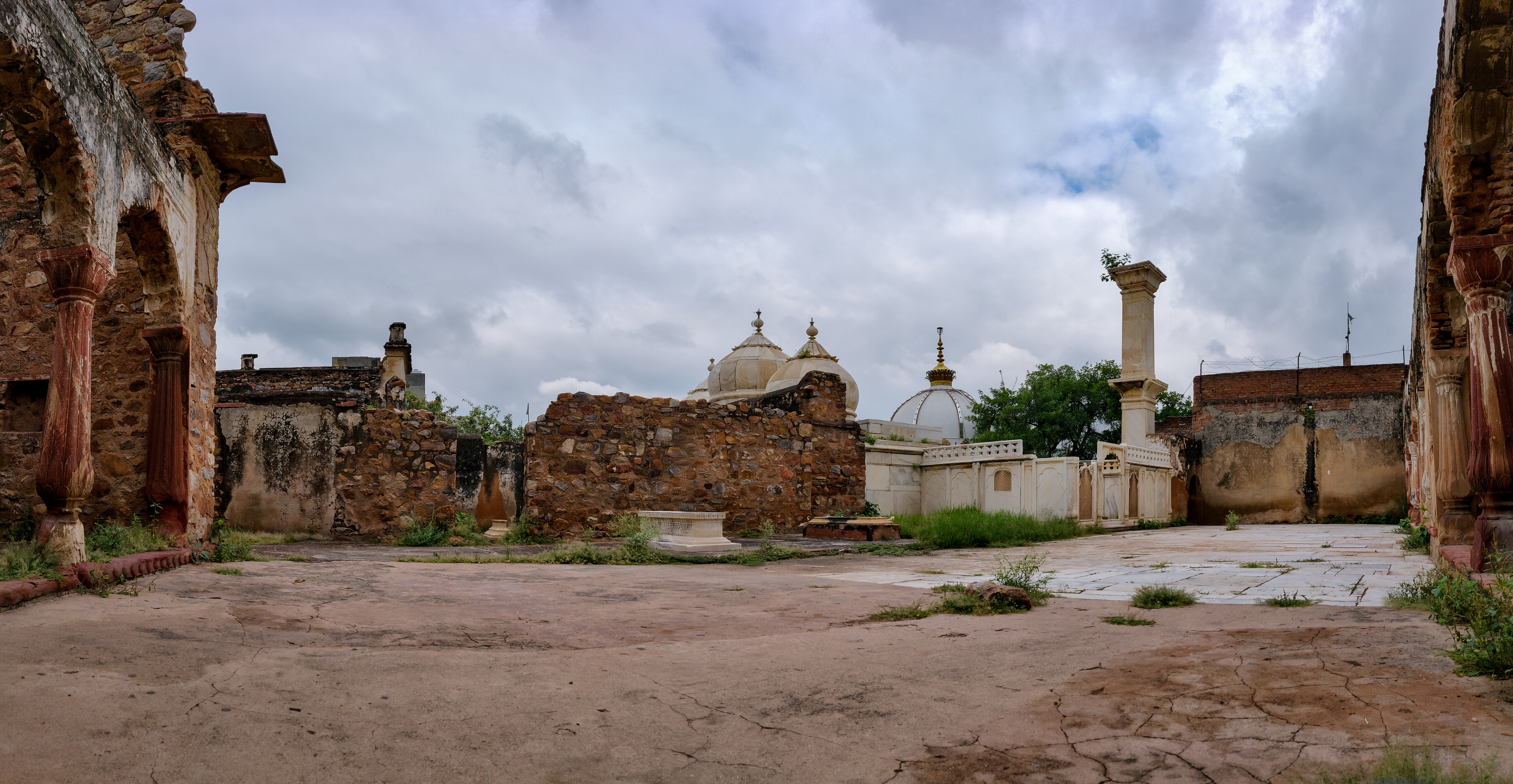
Ruins of Zafar Mahal

Every year Bahadur Shah Zafar used to visit this palace for hunting during the monsoon season. Also, every year, he was honoured at this palace during the Phool Walon Ki Sair (procession of the "Flower Sellers") festival held in February/March.

== Demolished or illegally occupied structures ==
Zafar Mahal used to be a huge palace. It consisted of many other structures which are no longer present or occupied by local residents. Some of these structures include:

- Diwan-e-Khaas of Bahadur Shah Zafar: It was situated 30 yards North-West of Zafar Palace or Hathi Gate. It consisted of ground floor and first floor. The eastern side on the ground floor consisted of row of arches. One could reach to the first floor by the staircase made of red sand stone, which was provided on the northern side. The ground floor inside consisted of a courtyard measuring 39 feet, surrounded by arched portico.
- House of Mirza Babur: It was built during the reign of Akbar II. Mirza Babur was the son of Akbar II.The house consisted of a court in its centre and seven bay verandas which is one bay deep, while the southern side gateway housed stable. The northern side of the house was marked by the presence of a Mughal Mosque. Some parts of this house are still present today located behind Zafar Mahal, it can be reached through a maze of tiny lanes. Called “Babur Mahal“ by the locals, it houses over a dozen families now. The foliated arches and floral patterns are still visible in the building. Each room in the original house has become individual dwellings for families and each family has modified the space according to its requirements.
- Baoli of Aurangzeb: Situated to the west of Zafar Mahal, it was built by Emperor Aurangzeb in imitation of the well at Gandhak ki Baoli and Rajon Ki Baoli. It measured 130 feet by 36 feet while the well was 30 feet in diameter, it contained 74 steps and was built in three stage. The area of the Baoli is now an uphill road with rows of homes, shops and warehouses on each side.
- House of Mirza Nili: Mirza Nili was a relative of Bahadur Shah Zafar. His house was situated some 10 yards to the south of Aurangzeb's baoli. It had an arched entrance from the market side, the western and northern side of the courts had verandas built in the modern style.
- Thana of Bahadur Shah Zafar: The site was located 50 yards south to the house of Mirza Nili. In 1920, Archaeologist and Historian Maulvi Zafar Hasan found it in the ruined condition and mentions only few arches.
- House of Mirza Salim: It was situated some 50 yards north to Zafar Mahal .(Recently one cannot find any traces of it as the modern houses are constructed here). Some person named Kallan occupied this place in the beginning of twentieth century. It was built during the period of Akbar Shah II. This was double storied house and was built in late Mughal style. The south eastern red sand stone gateway gave access to the forecourt of Zafar Mahal. Mirza Salim was the son of Akbar II and brother of Bahadur Shah Zafar.
- Khwas Pura: These were the quarters for the maid servants of the royal palace. It consisted of an inner court measuring 48 feet from north to south while 34 feet 8 inches from east to west, with a verandah on all the four sides. According to archaeologist Maulvi Zafar Hasan, in the beginning of the twentieth century this place was owned by a person named Ahmed Hasan and water carriers were living in these quarters.

== Conservation ==
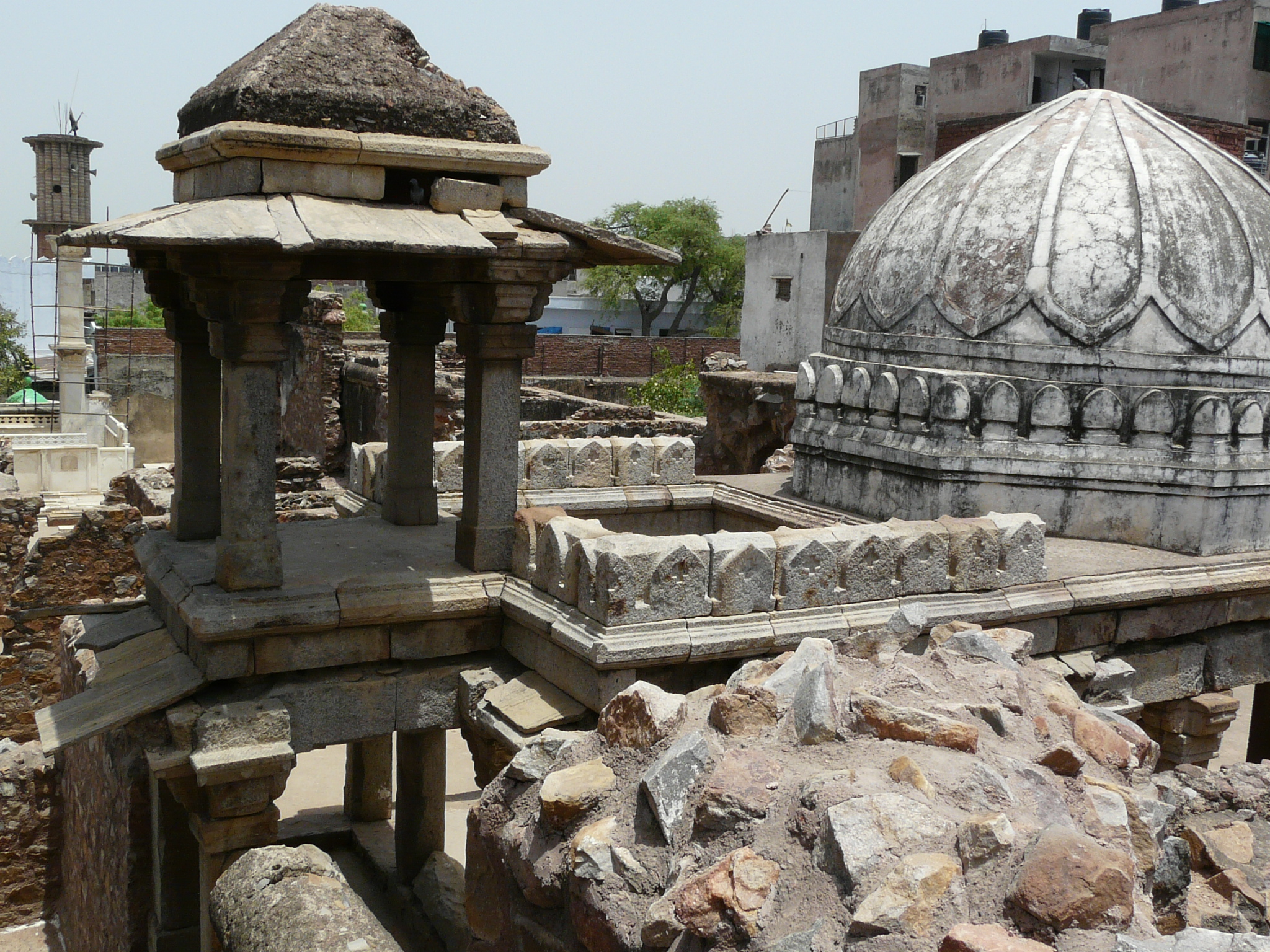
Tuqhlaq era dome in Zafar Mahal.

It was declared a protected monument in 1920 under the Ancient Monuments Preservation Act, 1904, but is now encroached with new structures built on parts of its southern and eastern walls. The Indian National Trust for Art and Cultural Heritage (INTACH) has also listed this monument as a conservation area. As a part conservation activity of heritage monuments, the Archaeological Survey of India (ASI) in 2009 proposed to set up the Mughal Museum in this palace with the intention of encouraging visitors and also to ensure removal of extensive encroachments (see photo in gallery below) that have taken place in the precincts of the old palace. ASI considers that the museum would be a tribute to the legendary last Mughal emperor Zafar who was known more for his poetry than his administrative achievements. But until today, no work has taken place to set up a museum or to remove the surrounding illegal encroachment. Despite being under the label of a "protected monument" by ASI, vandalism and encroachment incidents have become common due to the negligence of authorities.

== Poetic pathos ==
Bahadaur Shah Zafar who was known as the poet-king wished to be buried next to graves of his predecessors Bahadur Shah I (1701–1712), Shah Alam II (1759–1806), Akbar Shah II (1806–37) and their families at sardgah or grave in the marble enclosure adjoining the dargah of the 13th century Sufi saint, Qutbuddin Bakhtiyar Kaki in the Zafar Mahal precincts. He had special attachment to this place in Mehrauli, particularly with the tomb of Qutb Kaki, the Sufi saint of the Chisti order as he was his mureed (disciple).

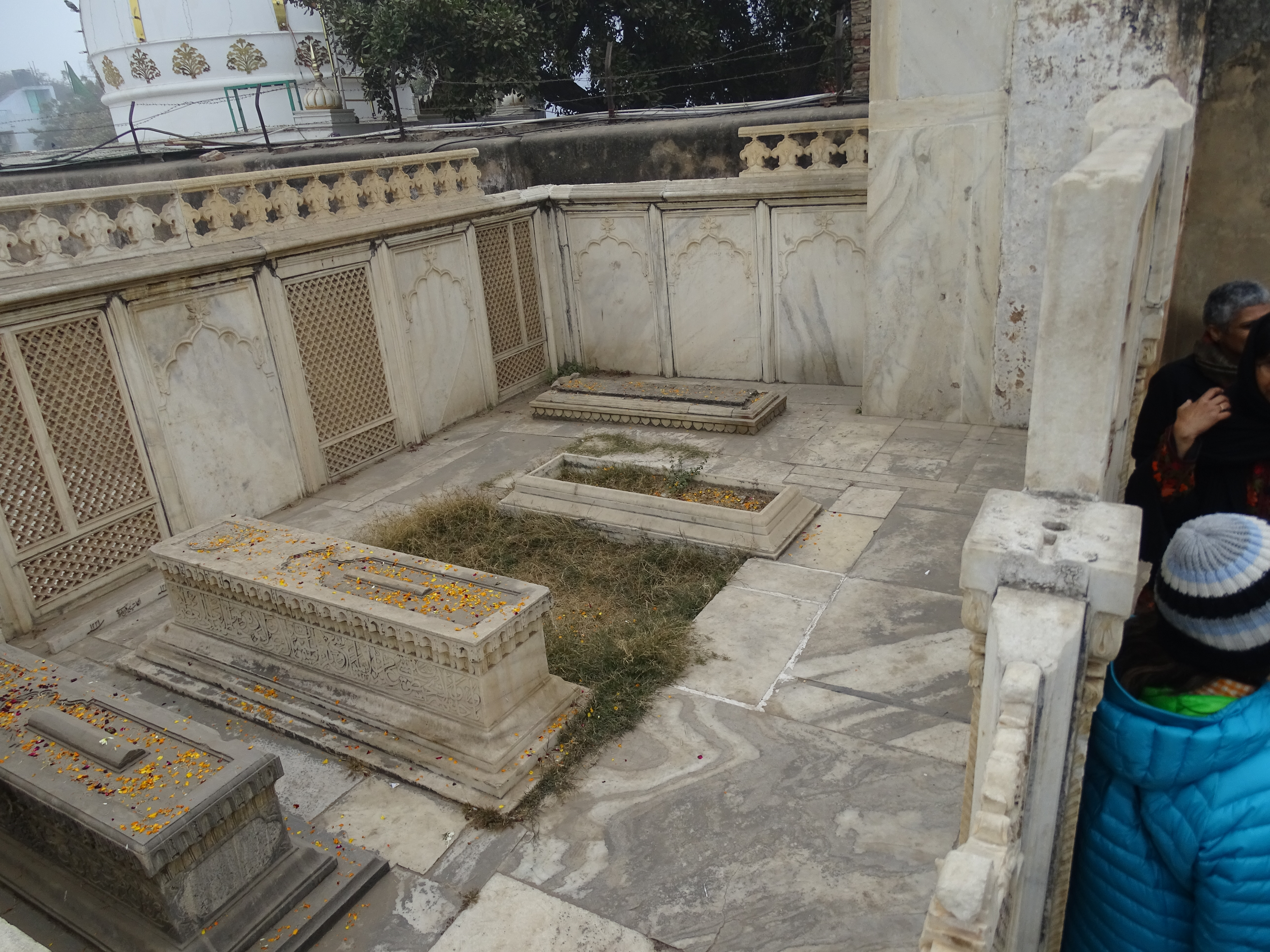
The spot where Bahadur Shah Zafar wanted to be buried

After he had been deported, while in Rangoon (now called Yangon) prison, Bahadaur Shah Zafar penned his couplet known by the title "do gaz zameen" meaning two yards of land, lamenting for his fate of not finding a place for his burial (at his chosen place of burial) in his home country. The couplet reads in Urdu language as:

Kitna hai badnaseeb Zafar
Dafn ke liye
Do gaz zameen bhi
Mil na saki kuye yaar mein

English translation:

How unlucky is Zafar! For burial, even two yards of land were not to be had in the land of his beloved.

Just before he died, he wrote some more ghazals (couplets), which are touching for the pathos they convey.

It is now, therefore, probably an appropriate time that a suitable memorial is erected at the vacant burial place he had chosen in the precincts of Zafar Mahal.

== Access ==
Mehrauli village in South Delhi is well connected by a good road net work and it is also part of the Qutb complex, which is a favourite visitors destination. New Delhi International Airport is 17 kilometres (11 mi) from Mehrauli. The nearest rail head is New Delhi Railway Station, which is 18 kilometres (11 mi) by road. But within Mehrauli, finding Zafar Mahal in the labyrinth of narrow streets of the village needs direction and landmarks. The tomb of Adham Khan is a much visited place and from here after crossing the main road and walking through a narrow lane reach Hazrat Qutubuddin Bakhtiar Khaki's shrine (a popular Muslim pilgrimage centre). From this shrine, walking barefoot after passing through twisting lanes reach Moti Masjid and the Zafar Mahal complex. The small marble enclosure on the right of the mosque houses the graves of some of the Mughal emperors and also the vacant grave of Emperor Bahadur Shah Zafar.

== Gallery ==
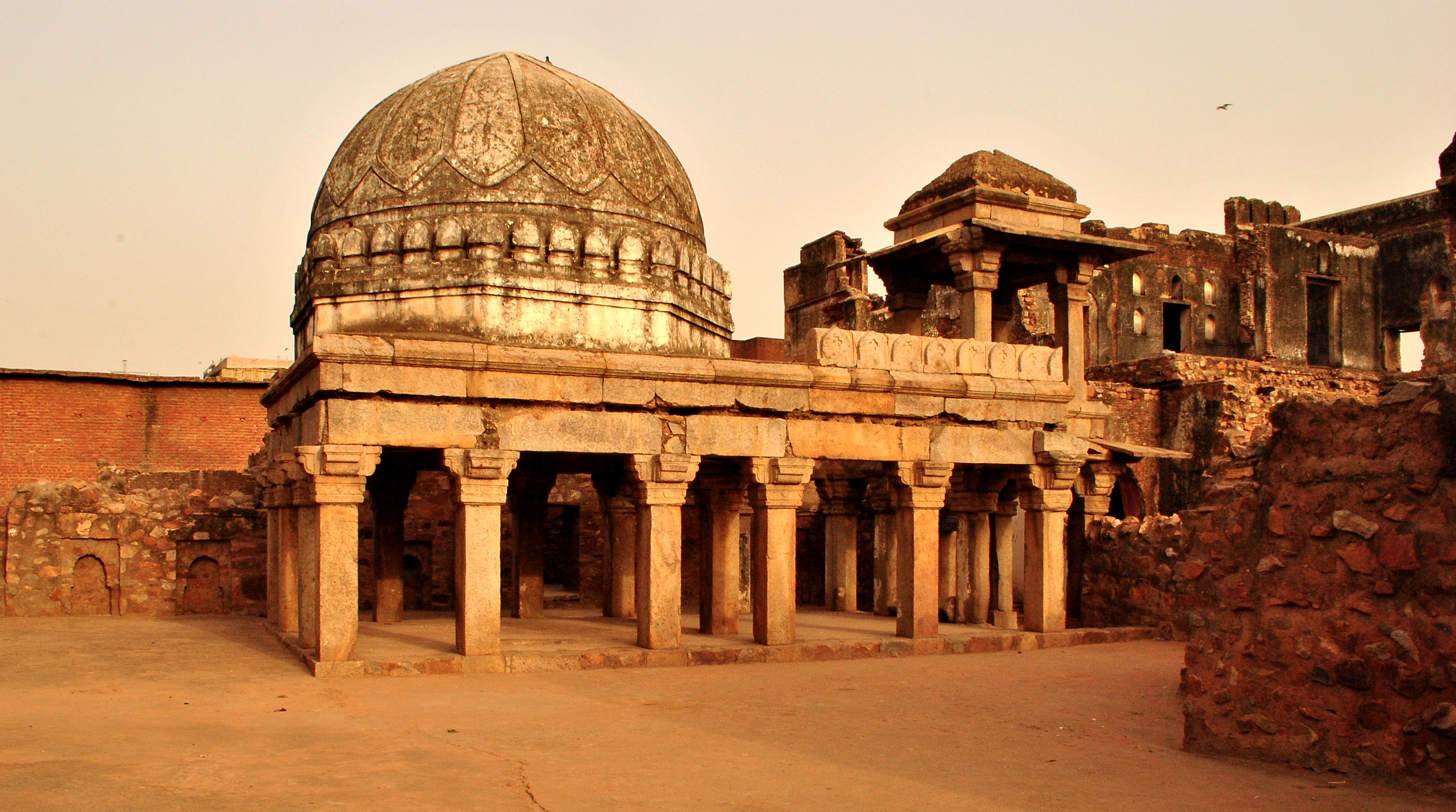
A domed pavilion in the courtyard of Zafar Mahal

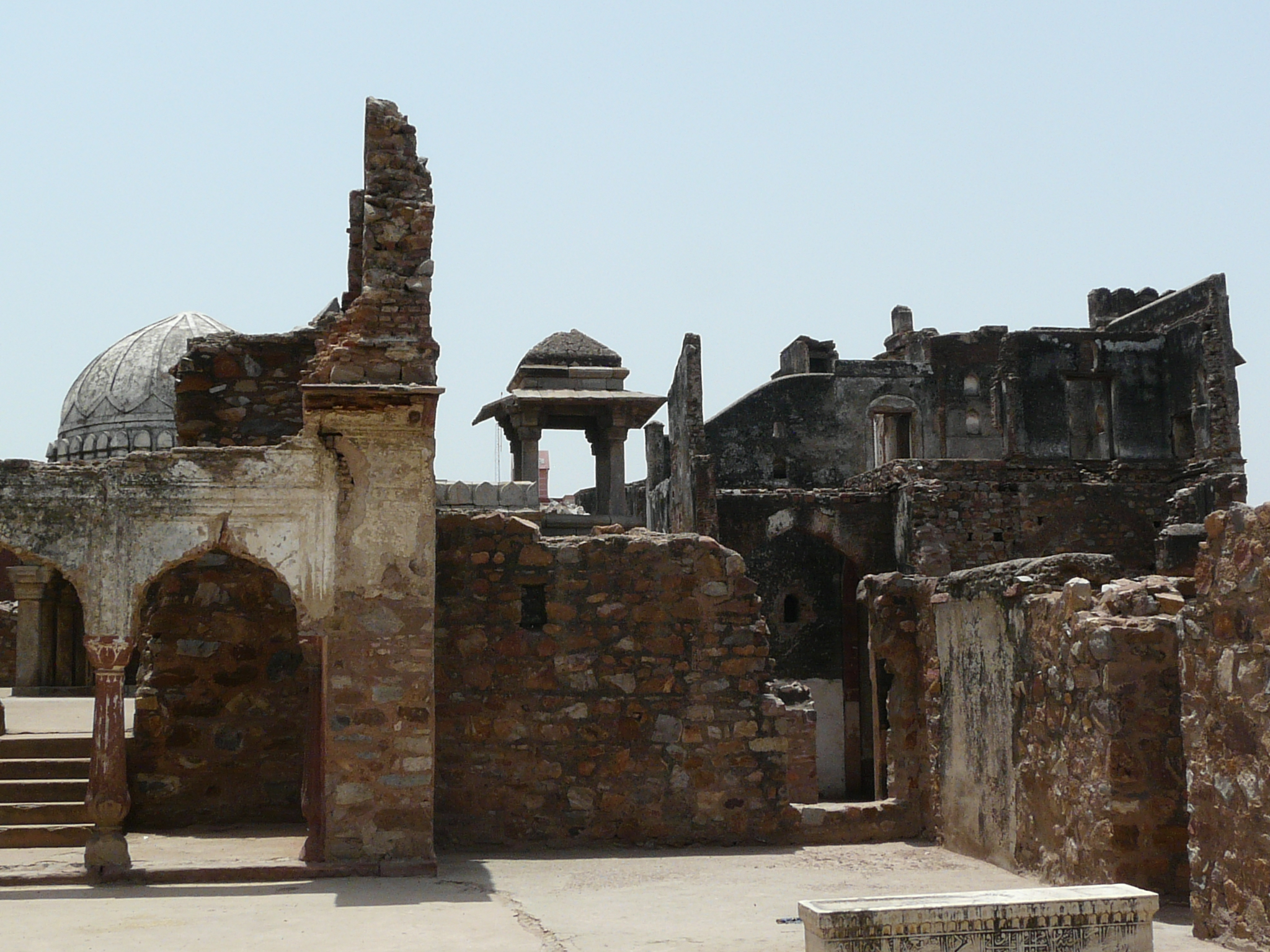
Ruins of the Palace

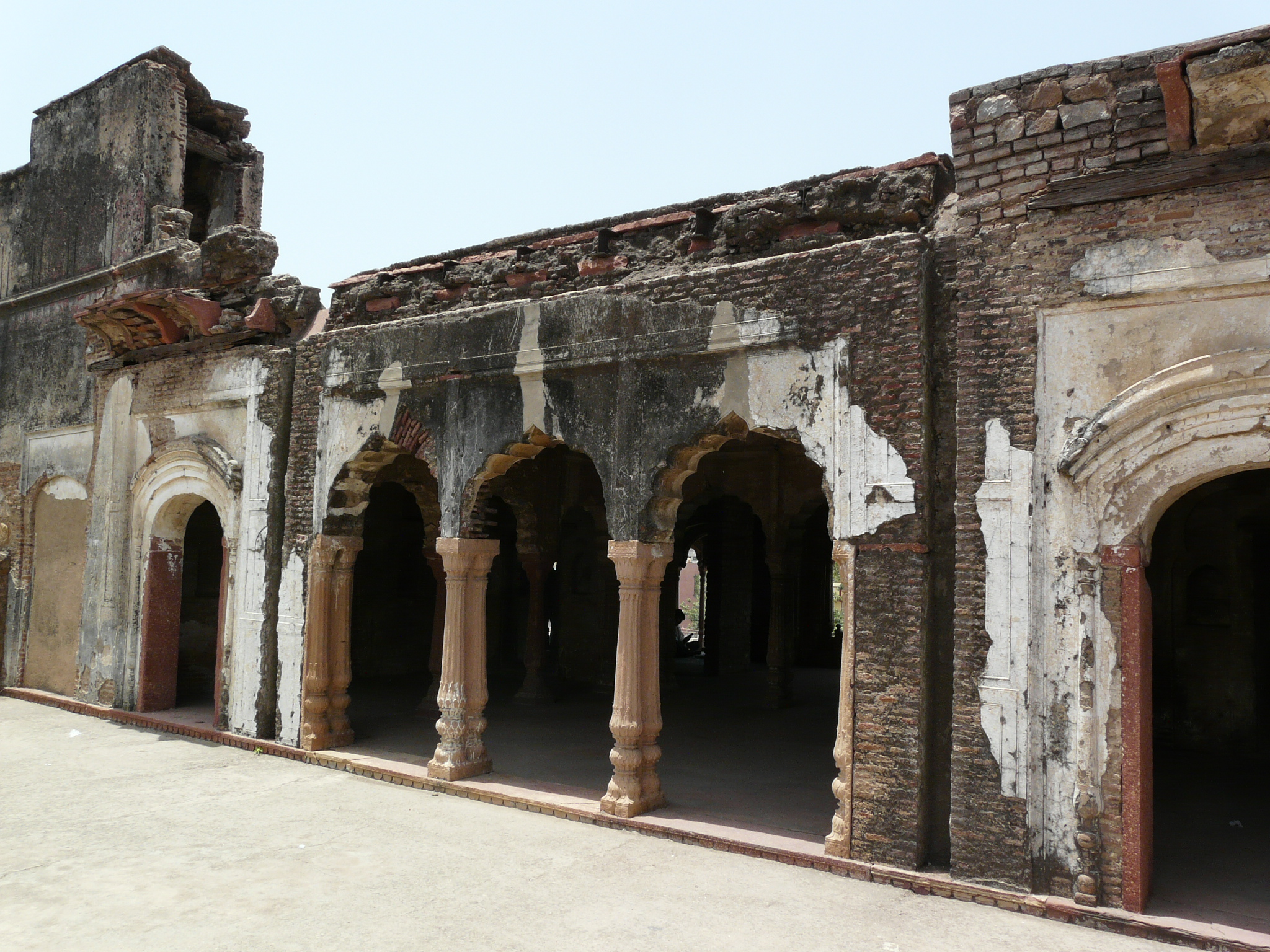
Dalan over Naubat Khana of ruined palace

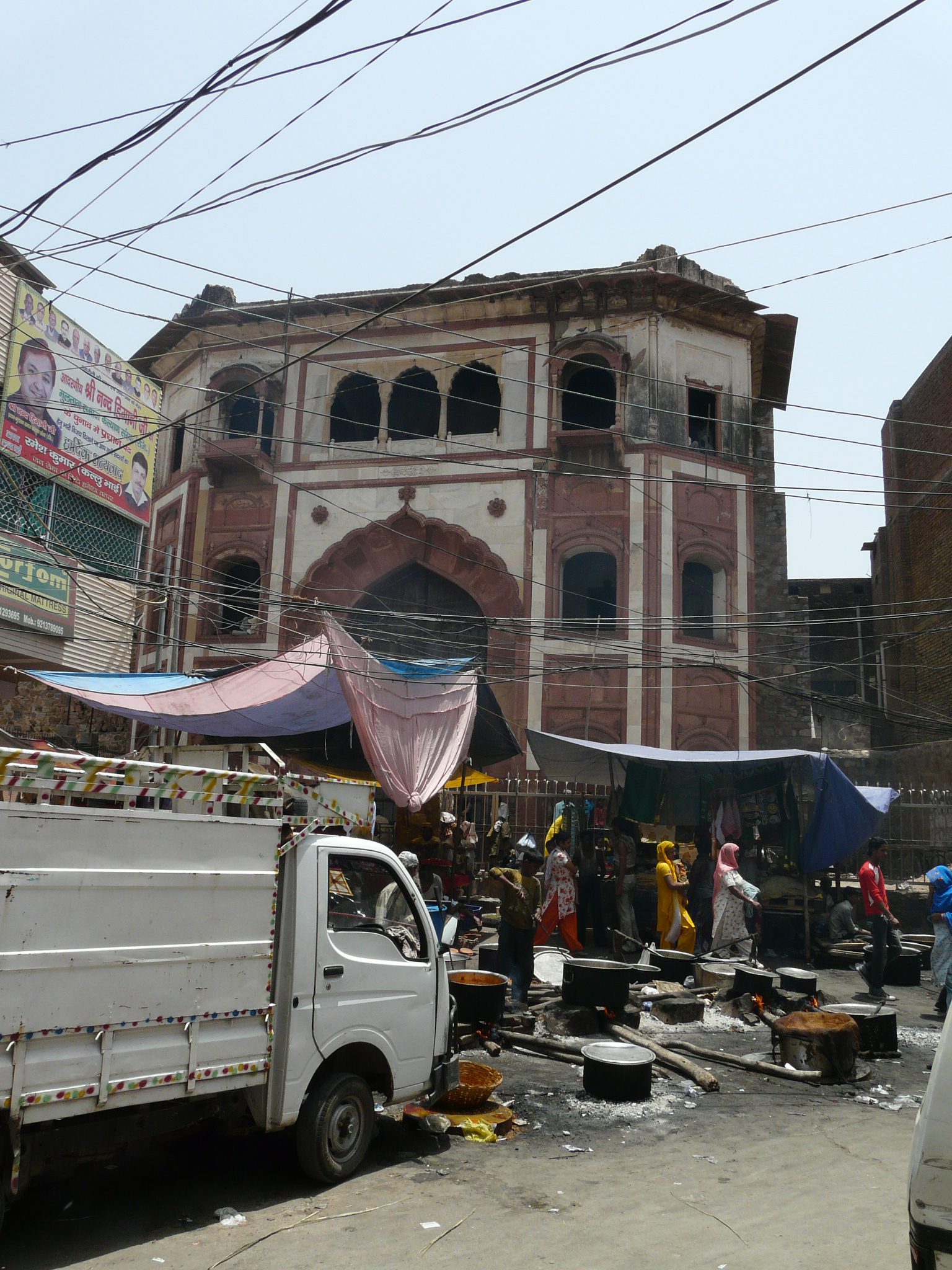
Zafar Mahal, Naubat Khana showing the surrounding encroachment

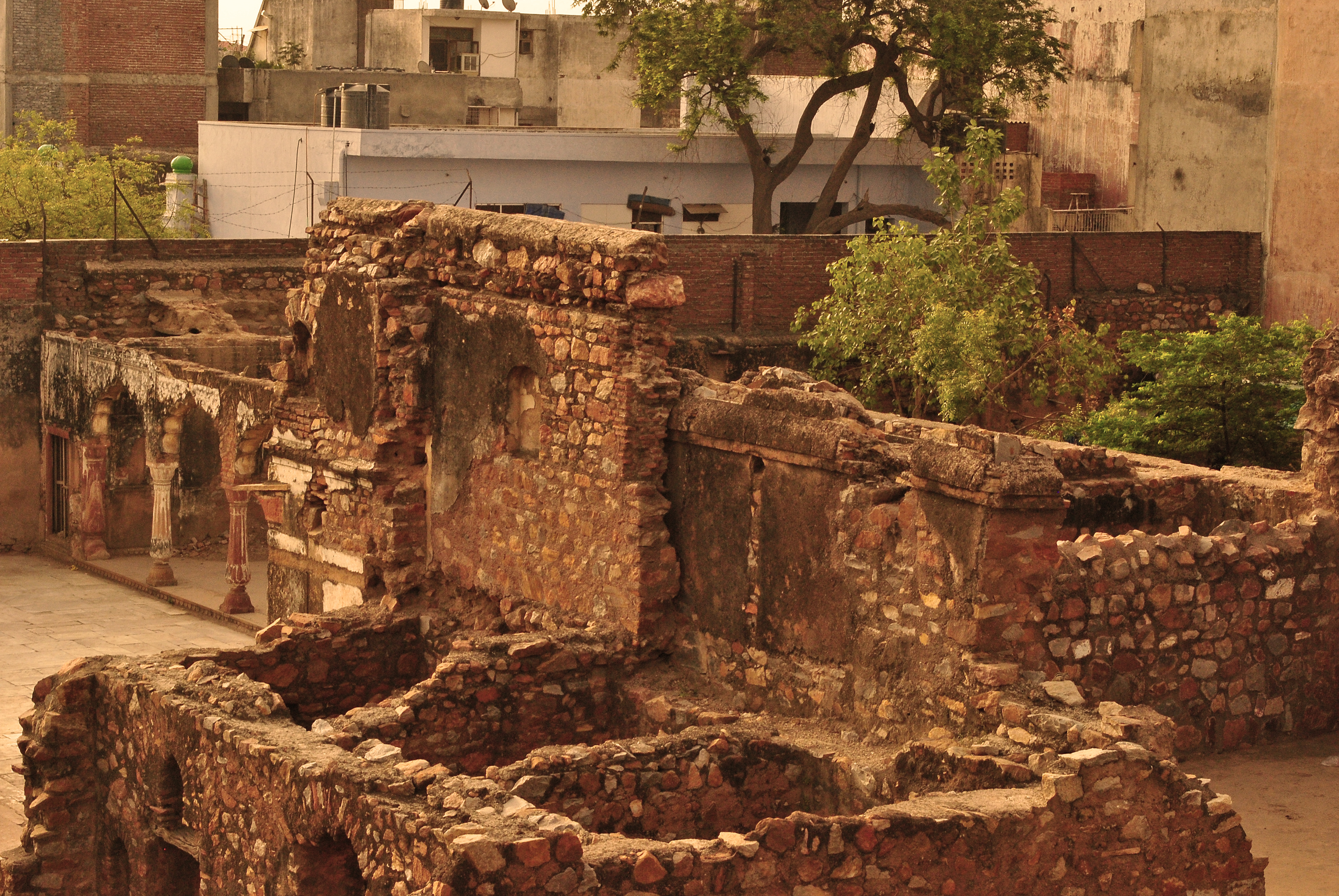
Inside Zafar Mahal

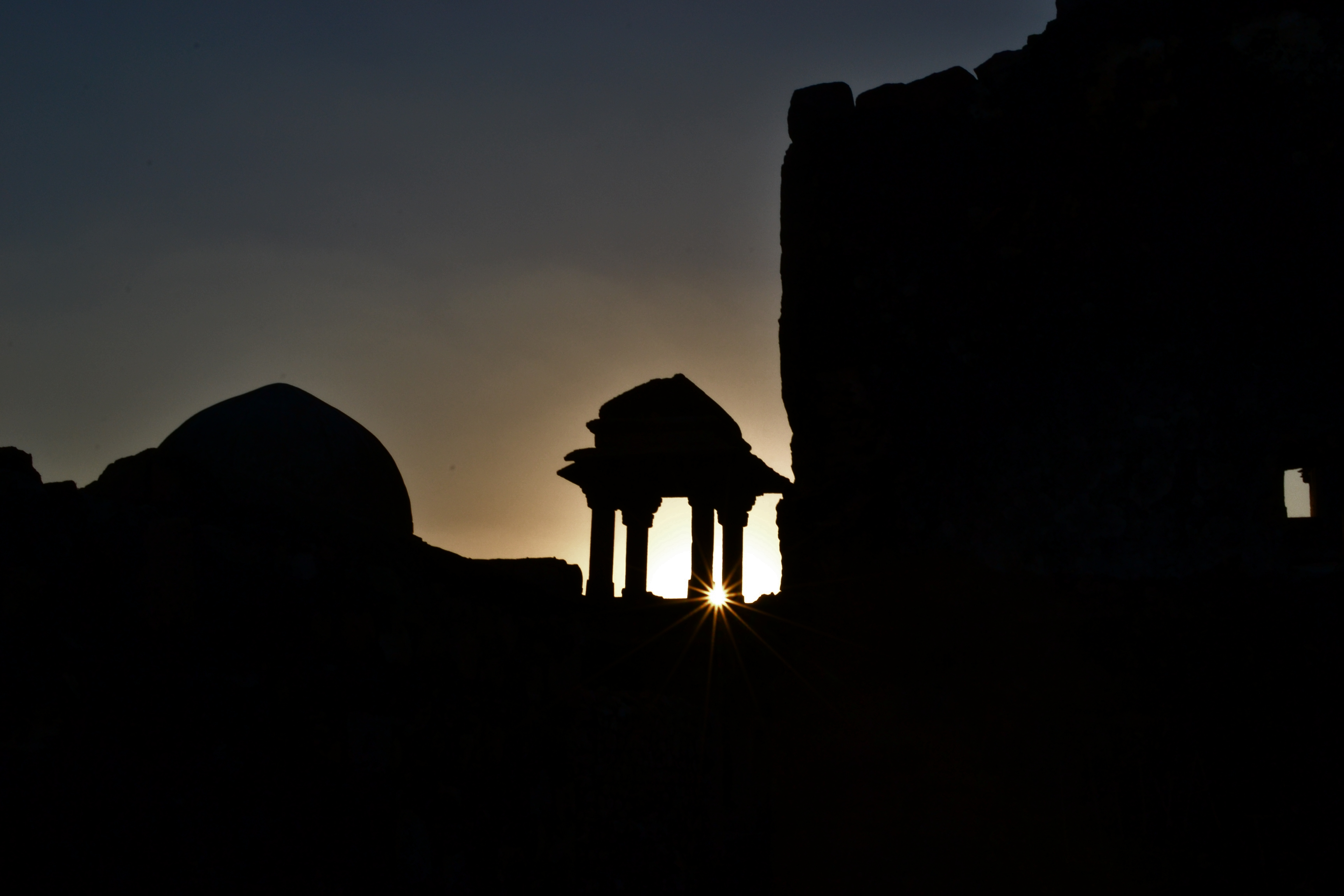
Sunset at Zafar Mahal

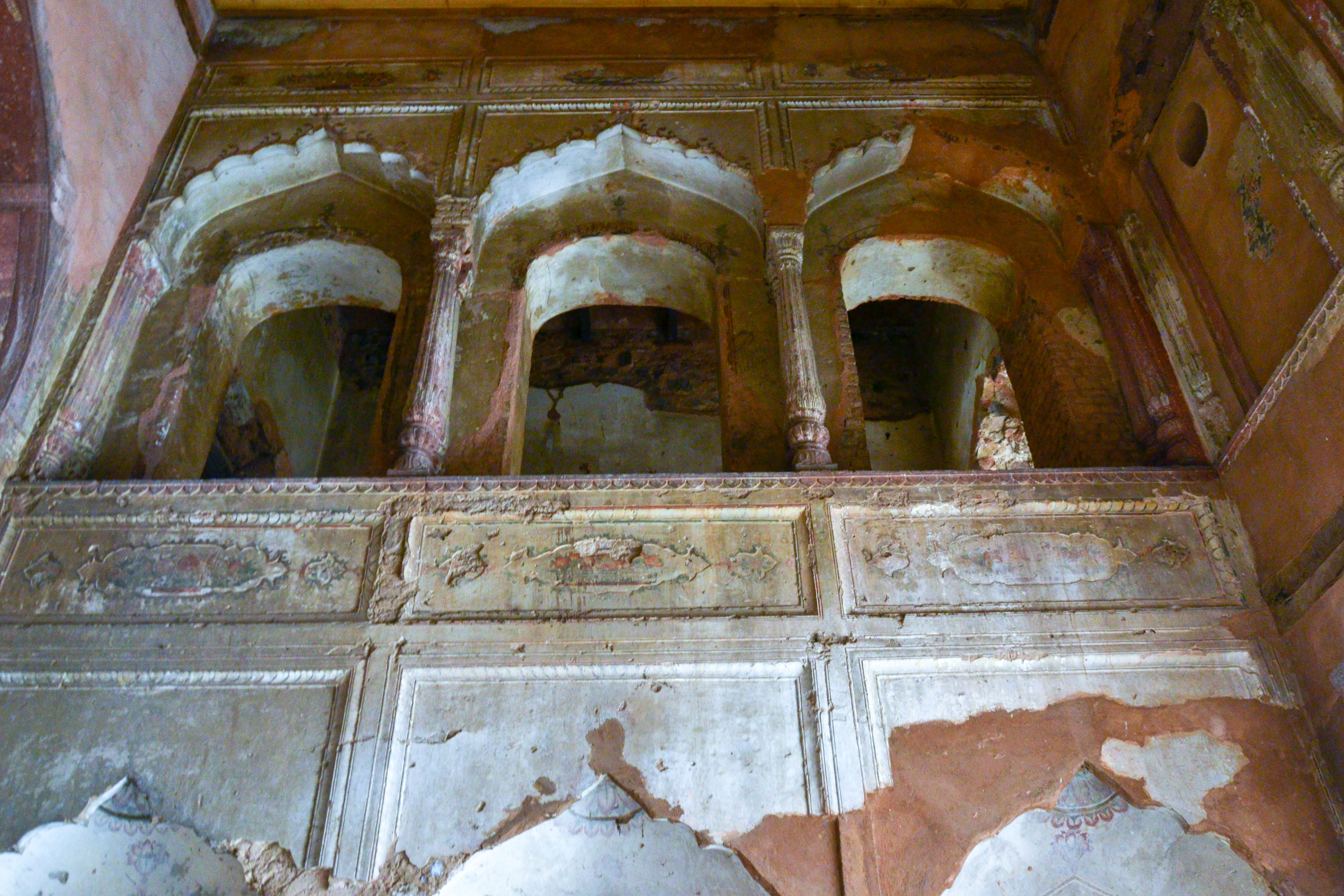
Inside the Hathi Gate of Zafar Mahal

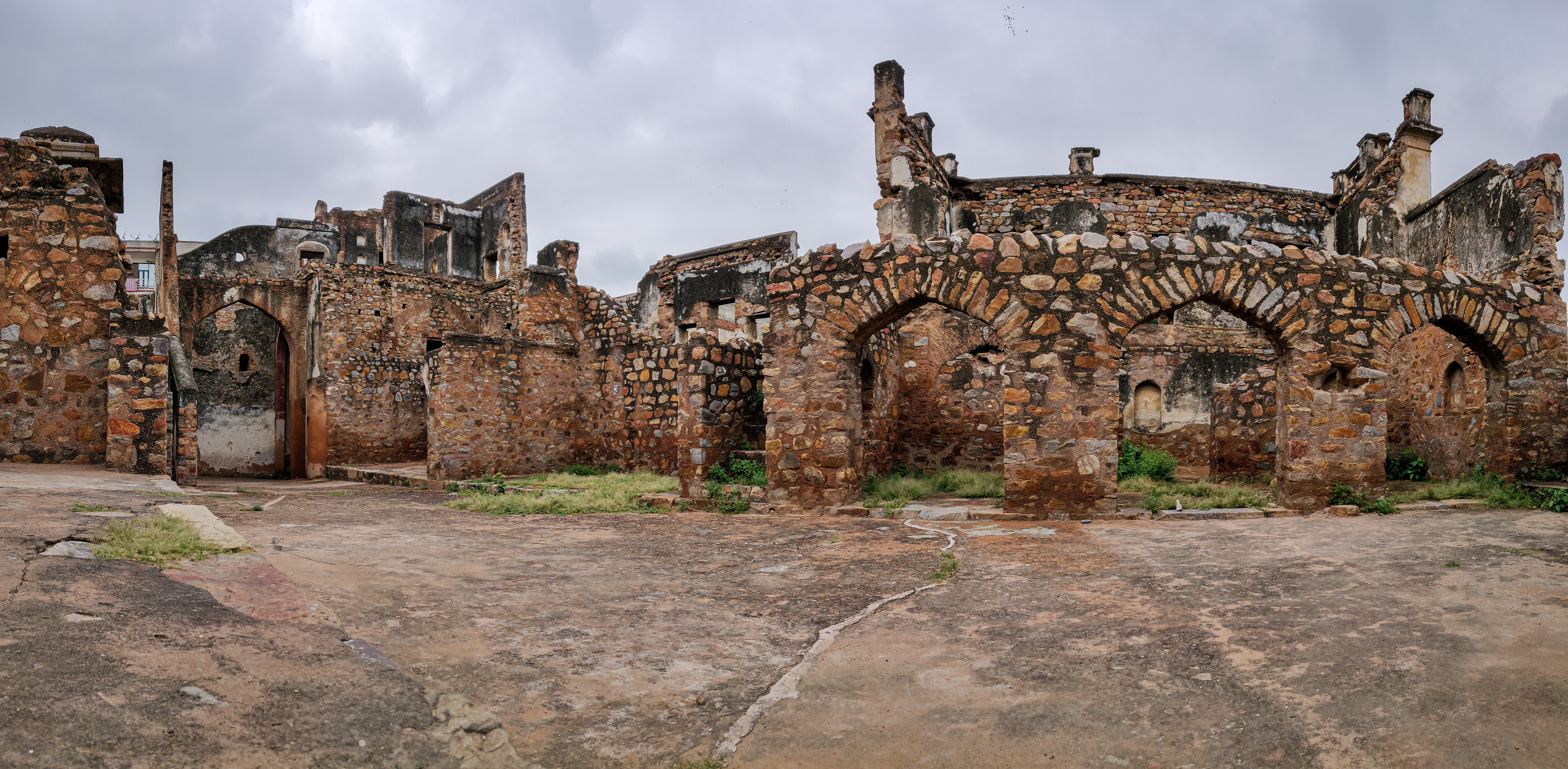
Ruins of Zafar Mahal

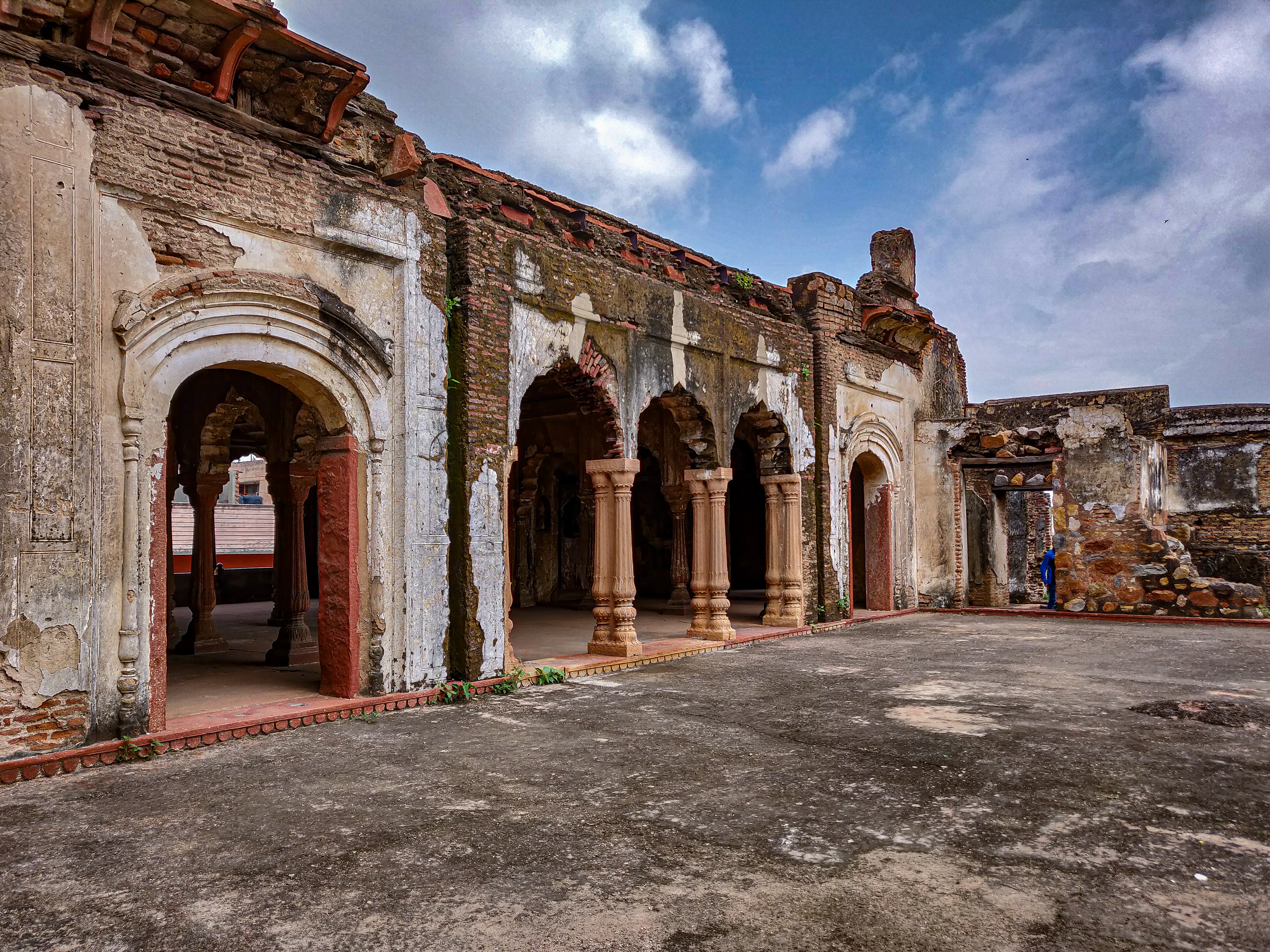
Dalan over Naubat Khana of Zafar Mahal
