= Qutbuddin Bakhtiar Kaki =

Sufi scholar and saint (1173–1235)

Khawaja; Hazrat; Qutb al-Din Bakhtiyar Kaki
- حضرت قطب الدین بختیار کاکی
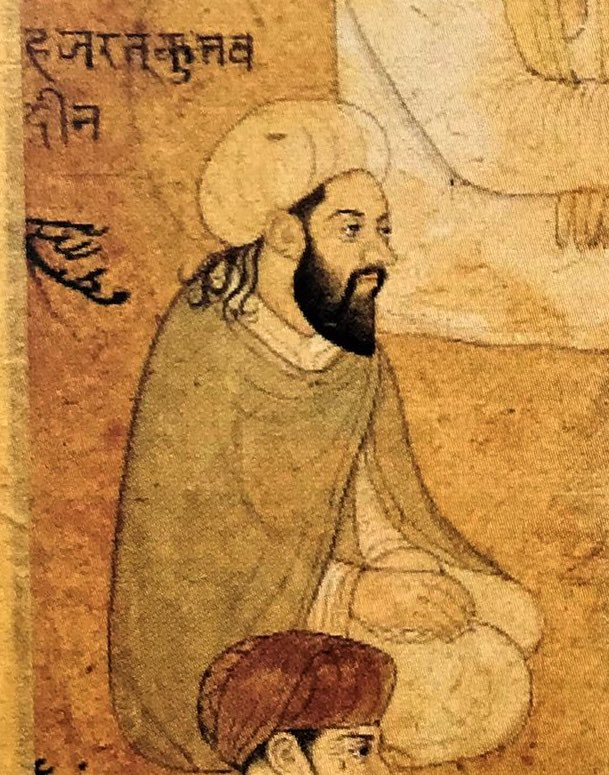
- Detail of Khawaja Qutub-ud-din from a Guler painting showing an imaginary meeting of Sufi saints
- Title: Qutub ul Aqtab

Personal life
- Born: 1173 Osh, Qara Khitai (present-day Kyrgyzstan)
- Died: 1 December 1235 (aged 61–62) Delhi, Delhi Sultanate
- Resting place: Mehrauli, Delhi; 28.519303°N 77.179856°E
- Other name: Malik al-Mashaa'ikh

Religious life
- Religion: Islam
- Denomination: Sunni
- Order: Chisti Sufism
- School: Sufism
- Lineage: Chishti Order
- Jurisprudence: Hanafi
- Creed: Maturidi

Muslim leader
- Based in: Delhi
- Period in office: Early 13th century
- Predecessor: Mu'in al-Din Chishti
- Successor: Fariduddin Ganjshakar, Bu Ali Shah Qalandar

Quṭb al-Aqṭāb Khwāja Sayyid Muḥammad Bakhtiyār al-Ḥusaynī, Quṭb al-Dīn Bakhtiyār Kākī (Arabic: قُطْبِ الدِّينِ بَخْتِيَارِ كَاكِي, romanized: Qutb-ud-Dīn Bakhtiyār Kākī) (born 1173 – died 1235) was a Sunni Muslim Sufi mystic, saint and scholar of the Chishti Order from Delhi, India. He was the disciple and the spiritual successor of Khawaja Sayyid Mu'in al-Din Chishti as head of the Chishti order. Before him the Chishti order in India was confined to Ajmer and Nagaur. He played a major role in establishing the order securely in Delhi. His Dargah is located adjacent to Zafar Mahal in Mehrauli, and is also the venue of his annual Urs festivities. The Urs was held in high regard by many rulers of Delhi like Iltutmish who built a nearby stepwell, Gandhak ki Baoli for him, Sher Shah Suri who built a grand gateway, Bahadur Shah I who built the Moti Masjid mosque nearby and Farrukhsiyar who added a marble screen and a mosque.

His most famous disciple and spiritual successor was Khawaja Sayyid Fariduddin Ganjshakar, who in turn became the spiritual master of Delhi's noted Sufi saint, Nizamuddin Auliya, who himself was the spiritual master of Amir Khusrau and Nasiruddin Chiragh Dehlavi.

Qutb al-Din Bakhtiyar Kaki had much influence on Sufism in India. As he continued and developed the traditional ideas of universal brotherhood and charity within the Chisti order, a new dimension of Islam started opening up in India which had hitherto not been present. He forms an important part of the Sufi movement which attracted many people to Islam in India in the thirteenth and fourteenth centuries. People of every religion like Hindus, Christians, Sikhs, etc. visiting his Dargah every week.

== Early life ==
Qutb al-Din Bakhtiyar Kaki was born in 569 A.H. (1173 C.E.) in the ancient city of Osh (alternatively Awsh or Ush) in the Fergana Valley (present Osh in southern Kyrgyz Republic (Kyrgyzstan), part of historic Transoxiana). According to his biography mentioned in, Ain-i-Akbari, written in the 16th century by Mughal Emperor Akbar’s vizier, Abu'l-Fazl ibn Mubarak, he was the son of Sayyid Kamal al-Din Musa al-Husayni, whom he lost at the young age of a year and a half.

Khwaja Qutb al-Din's original name was Bakhtiyar and later on he was given the title Qutb al-Din. He was a Husayni Sayyid and his lineage is recorded as follows: He is Qutb al-Din Bakhtiyar bin Kamal al-Din Musa, bin Muhammad, bin Ahmad, bin Husam al-Din, bin Rashid al-Din, bin Radi al-Din, bin Hasan, bin Muhammad Ishaq, bin Muhammad, bin Ali, bin Ja'far, bin Ali al-Rida, bin Musa al-Kazim, bin Ja'far al-Sadiq, bin Muhammad al-Baqir, bin Ali Zayn al-Abidin, bin Husayn, bin Ali bin Abi Talib and Fatimah al-Zahra, the daughter of Prophet Muhammad. His mother, who herself was an educated lady, arranged for his education by Shaikh Abu Hafs. And his known descendants are in Karachi, Pakistan, including Hazrat Sahabzada Syed Muhammad Mateen Ali Chisti, his spiritually successor and sons Hazrat Syed Irshad Ali Chisti Mateeni, Hazrat Sahabzada Syed Muhammad Nasir Ali Chisti Mateeni.

Qutb al-Din Bakhtiyar Kaki took oath of allegiance at the hands of Khawaja Mu'in al-Din Chishti, and received the khilafat and khirqa (Sufi cloak) from him, when Khawaja Mu'in al-Din Chishti passed through Osh during his journey to Isfahan. His spiritual master then guided him to India and asked him to stay there. Thus, he was the first spiritual successor of Mu'in al-Din Chishti.

== Later life ==
=== Move to Delhi ===
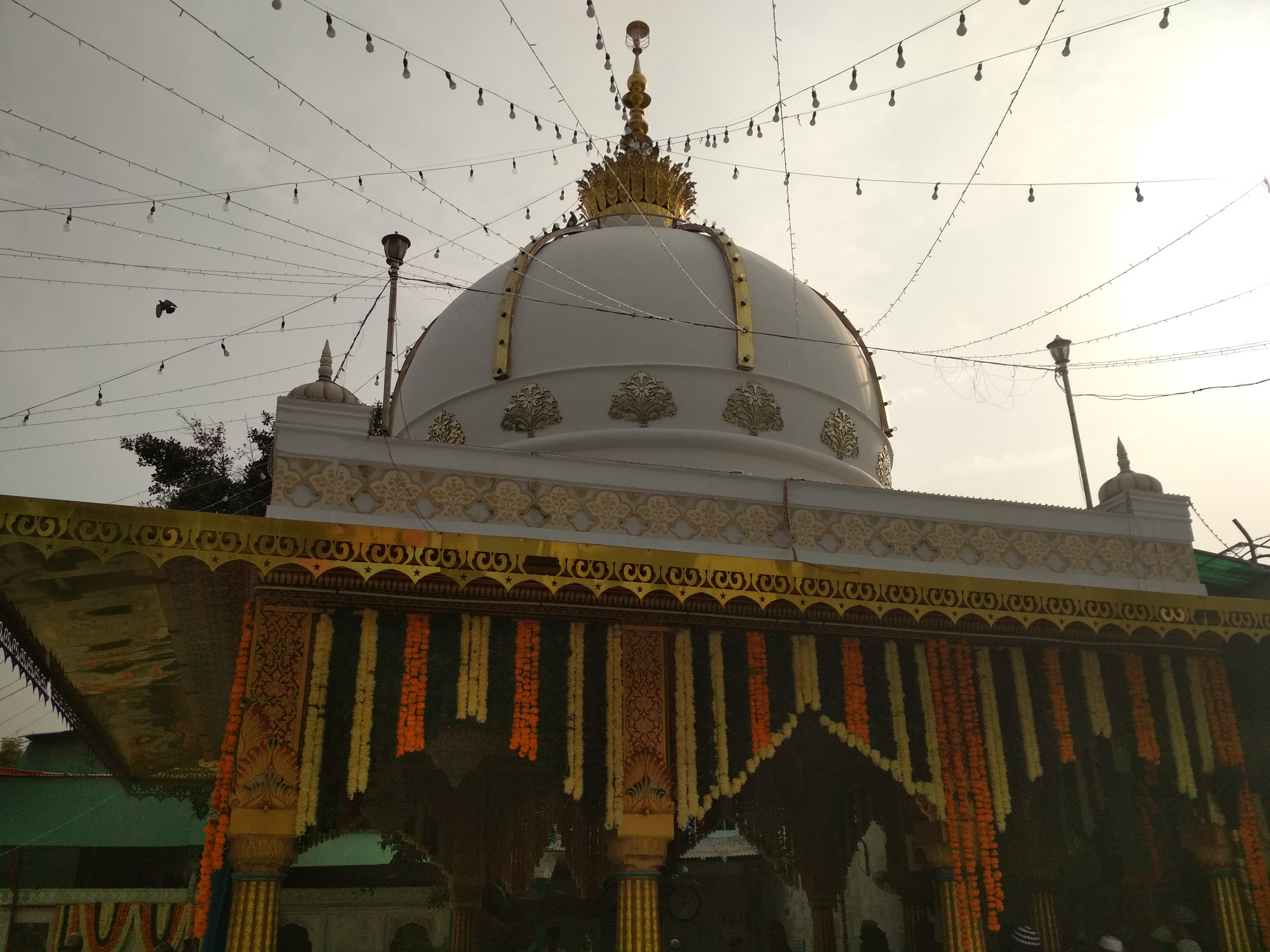
Dargah of Qutb al-Din Bakhtiyar Kaki in Mehrauli, Delhi

In obedience to the desire of his spiritual master, Mu'in al-Din Chishti, Khwaja Bakhtiyar moved to the city of Delhi during the reign of Iltutmish (r. 1211–1236) of the Delhi Sultanate. Many people started visiting him daily.

He was called Kaki due to a Karamat (miracle) attributed to him in Delhi. It is said that he asked his wife not to take credit from the local baker despite their extreme poverty. Instead he told her to pick up Kak (a kind of bread) from a corner of their house whenever needed. After this, his wife found that Kak miraculously appeared in that corner whenever she required it. The baker, in the meantime, had become worried whether the Khwaja had stopped taking credit due to being perchance angry with him. Accordingly, when the baker's wife asked the reason from the Khwaja's wife, she told her about the miracle of Kak. Although the Kak stopped appearing after this, from that day the people started referring to him as Kaki.

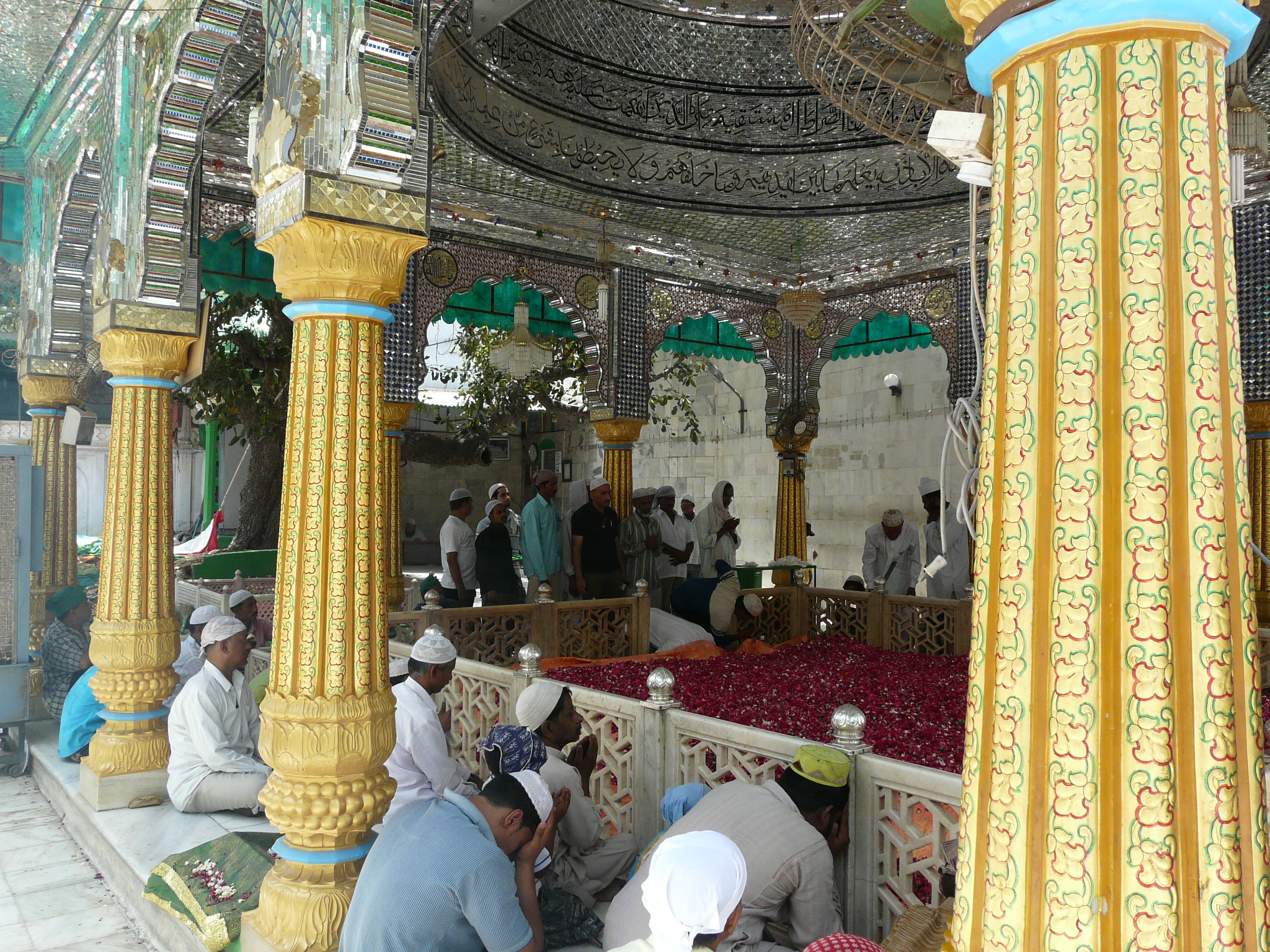
Qutb al-Din Bakhtiyar Kaki's dargah

He was a great believer in helping the needy without heeding the result. When an eminent disciple, Farid al-Din Ganjshakar, asked him about the legality of amulets (ta'wiz) which were controversial as they could lead to theological problems of semi-idolatory in Islam, he replied that the fulfilment of desires belonged to no one; the amulets contained God's name and His words and could be given to the people.

He continued and extended the musical tradition of the Chisti order by participating in sama or Mehfil-e-Sama. It is conjectured that this was with the view that, being in consonance with the role of music in some modes of Hindu worship, it could serve as a basis of contact with the local people and would facilitate mutual adjustments between the two communities. On the 14th of Rabi' al-Awwal 633 A.H. (27 November 1235 CE) he attended a Mehfil-e-Sama where the poet Sheikh Ahmad-e Jami sang the following verses:

Those who are slain by the dagger of surrender;
Receive every moment a new life from the unseen.

Khwaja Bakhtiyar Kaki was so overcome and enraptured by these verses that he fainted away. He died four days later while still in that state of ecstasy. His dargah (shrine) is adjacent to the Zafar Mahal, near Qutb Minar complex, in Mehrauli, Delhi. After his death his will was read that emphasized that only the person who has done no haram and has never left the sunnah of Asr prayer may only lead his namaz-e-janaza (funeral prayer). This left to a brief lull as nearly everybody did not adhered to the contents of the will. Finally a teary eyed Illtutmish came out of the congregation saying that "I did not want to reveal my inner self to everybody but the will of Khwaja Bakhtiyar Kaki wants to". His Janaza prayer was finally led by Illtutmish as he was the only person who fulfilled and adhered to the contents of the will.

Left of the Ajmeri Gate of the dargah at Mehrauli, lies Moti Masjid, a small mosque for private prayer built by Mughal emperor Bahadur Shah I in 1709, an imitation of the much larger Moti Masjid built by his father, Aurangzeb, inside the Red Fort of Delhi.

=== His influence over people ===
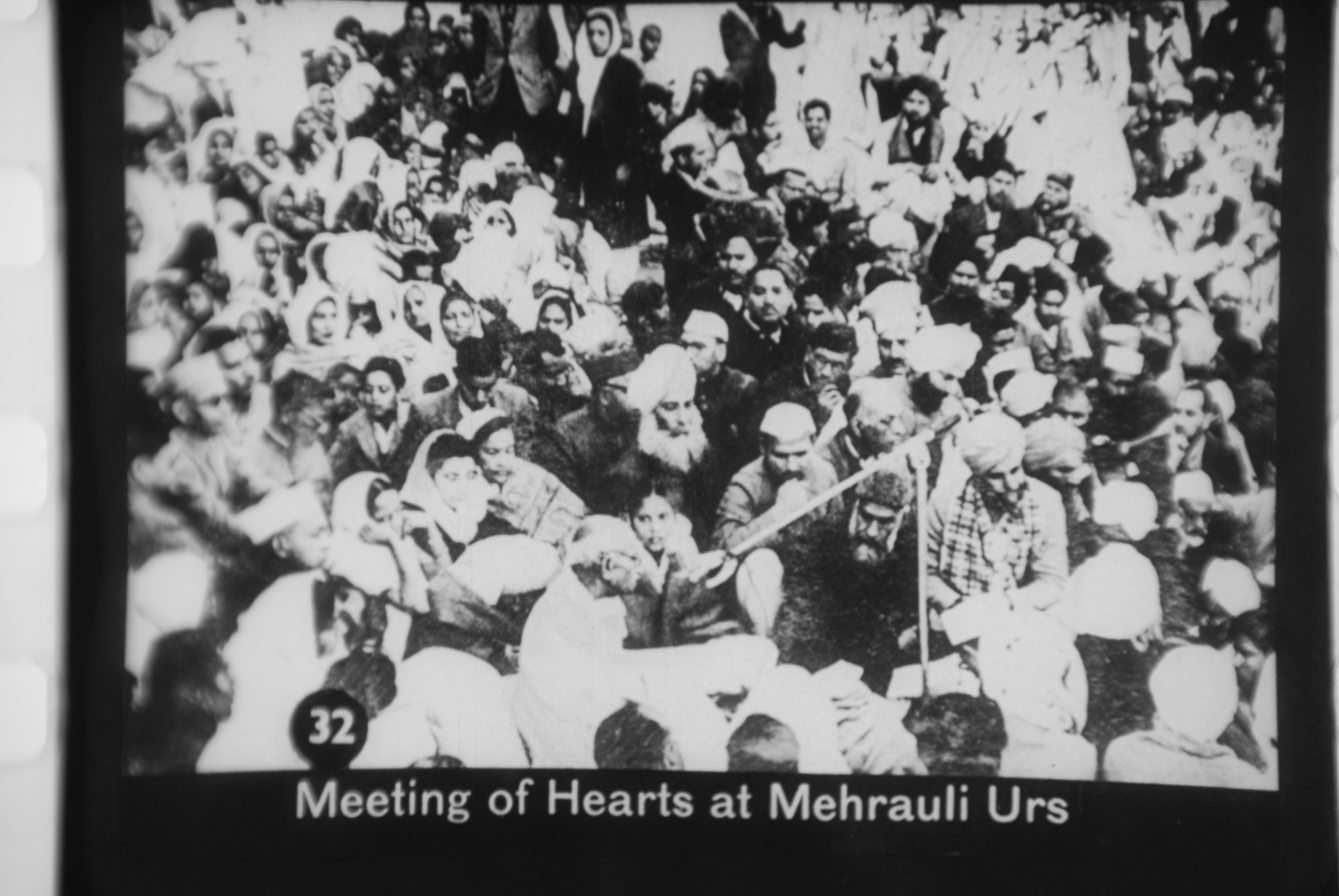
Mahatma Gandhi visiting the Dargah during the Annual Urs, 1948.

As a well-known saint, Khwaja Bakhtiyar Kaki exercised great sway over the people. He continued the policy of non-involvement with the government of the day. This was the traditional way of saints of the Chisti order in South Asia, as they felt that their linkage with rulers and the government would turn their mind towards worldly matters.

During the lifetime of the Khwaja he was held in great esteem by the Delhi Sultan, Iltutmish. It is contended that the Qutb Minar, the world's tallest brick minaret, partially built by Iltumish, was named so after him. He was also the favorite saint of the Lodi dynasty which ruled over Delhi from 1451 to 1526. His importance continues to this day and can be gauged by the following historical fact. When Mahatma Gandhi launched his last fast-unto-death in Delhi in 1948, asking that all communal violence be ended once and for all, he was pressed by leaders of all denominations to end the fast. One of the six conditions that Gandhi put forward to end the fast was that Hindus and Sikhs as an act of atonement should repair the shrine of Khwaja Bakhtiyar Kaki which had been damaged during the communal riots.

=== Phoolwalon-ki-sair festival ===
The darbaar shrine of Qutb al-Din Bakhtiyar Kaki has also been the venue of the annual Phoolwalon-ki-sair (a festival of flower-sellers) in autumn, which has now become an important inter-faith festival of Delhi.

The festival has its origins in 1812, when Queen Mumtaz Mahal, wife of the Mughal Emperor, Akbar II (r. 1806–1837) made a vow to offer a chadar and flower pankha at the Dargah and a pankha at the Yogmaya Temple, also at Mehrauli, if her son Mirza Jehangir, who, after inviting the wrath of Sir Archibald Seton, the then British Resident of the Red Fort, was exiled to Allahabad, returned safely. And as the legend goes, he did, and so began the tradition. The festival was stopped by the British in 1942, but later revived by the Indian Prime Minister Jawaharlal Nehru in 1961 to bridge the Hindu-Muslim gap, and inculcate secularist ideals.

=== Royal grave enclosure ===
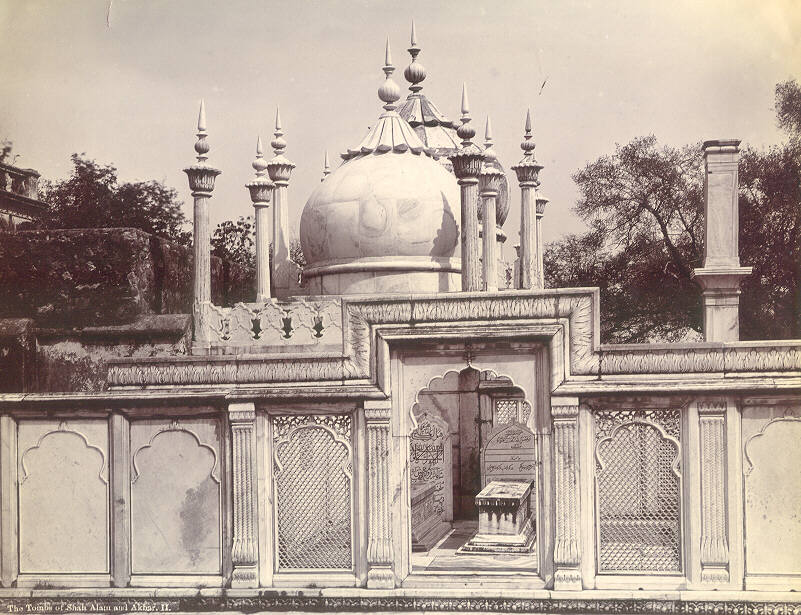
The tombs of Shah Alam II and his son Akbar II, with Moti Masjid in the background, next to the Kaki Mausoleum complex in 1890s

Incidentally, Akbar II is now buried nearby in a marble enclosure, along with other Mughals, Bahadur Shah I and Shah Alam II. An empty grave, also known as Sardgah, of the last Mughal Emperor Bahadur Shah Zafar, can also be found here, as he had willed to be buried next to the famous shrine, as did his previous Mughal predecessors. Unfortunately, he was exiled to Burma where he died. Talks of bringing back his remains here have been raised in the past, from time to time.

== Works ==
- Divan-i Khwajah Qutb al-Din Bakhtiyar Kaki

== Gallery ==
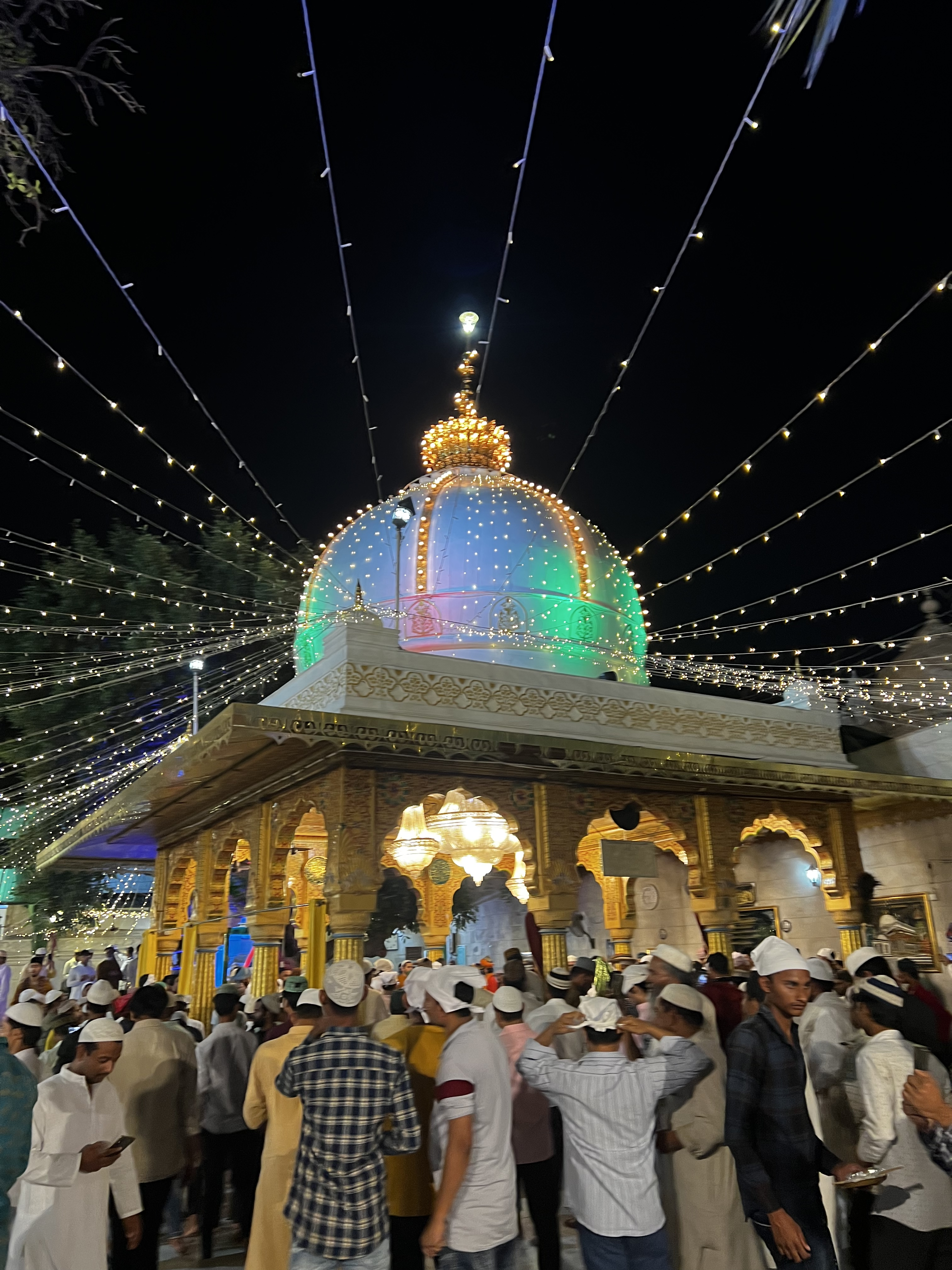
Annual Urs Celebration

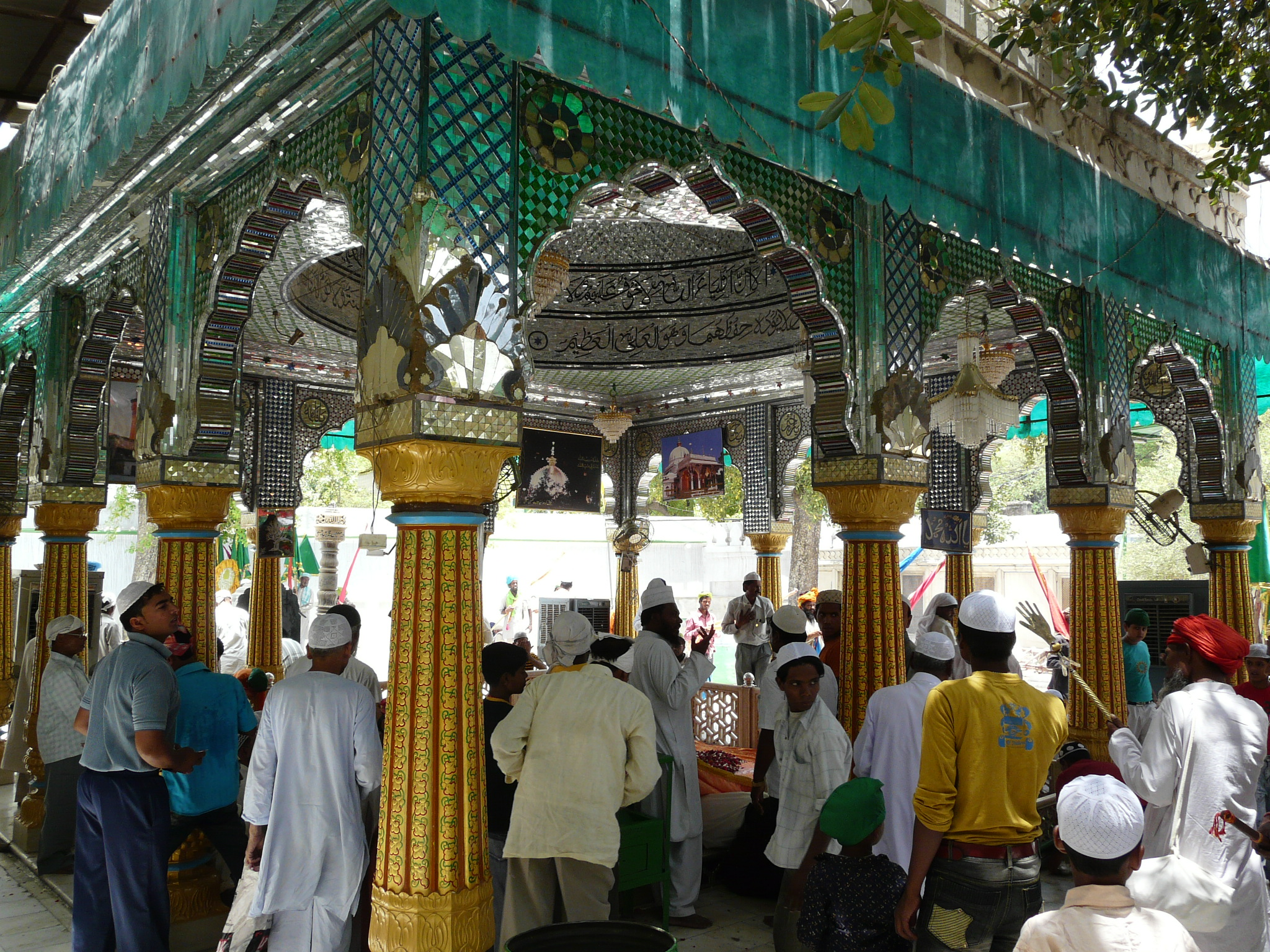
Qutb al-Din Bakhtiyar Kaki's tomb, Mehrauli

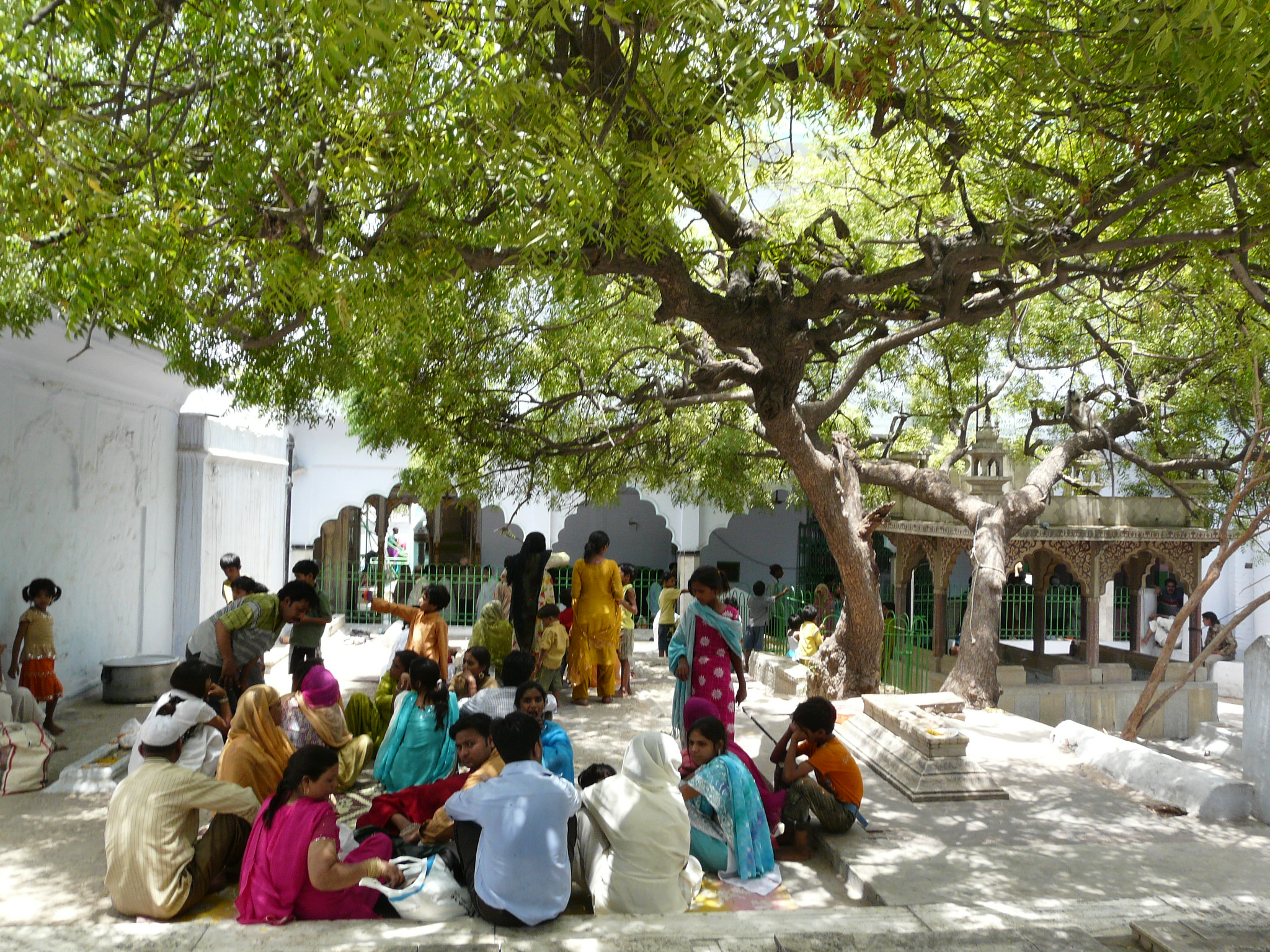
Courtyard of the Qutb al-Din Bakhtiyar Kaki's dargah complex.

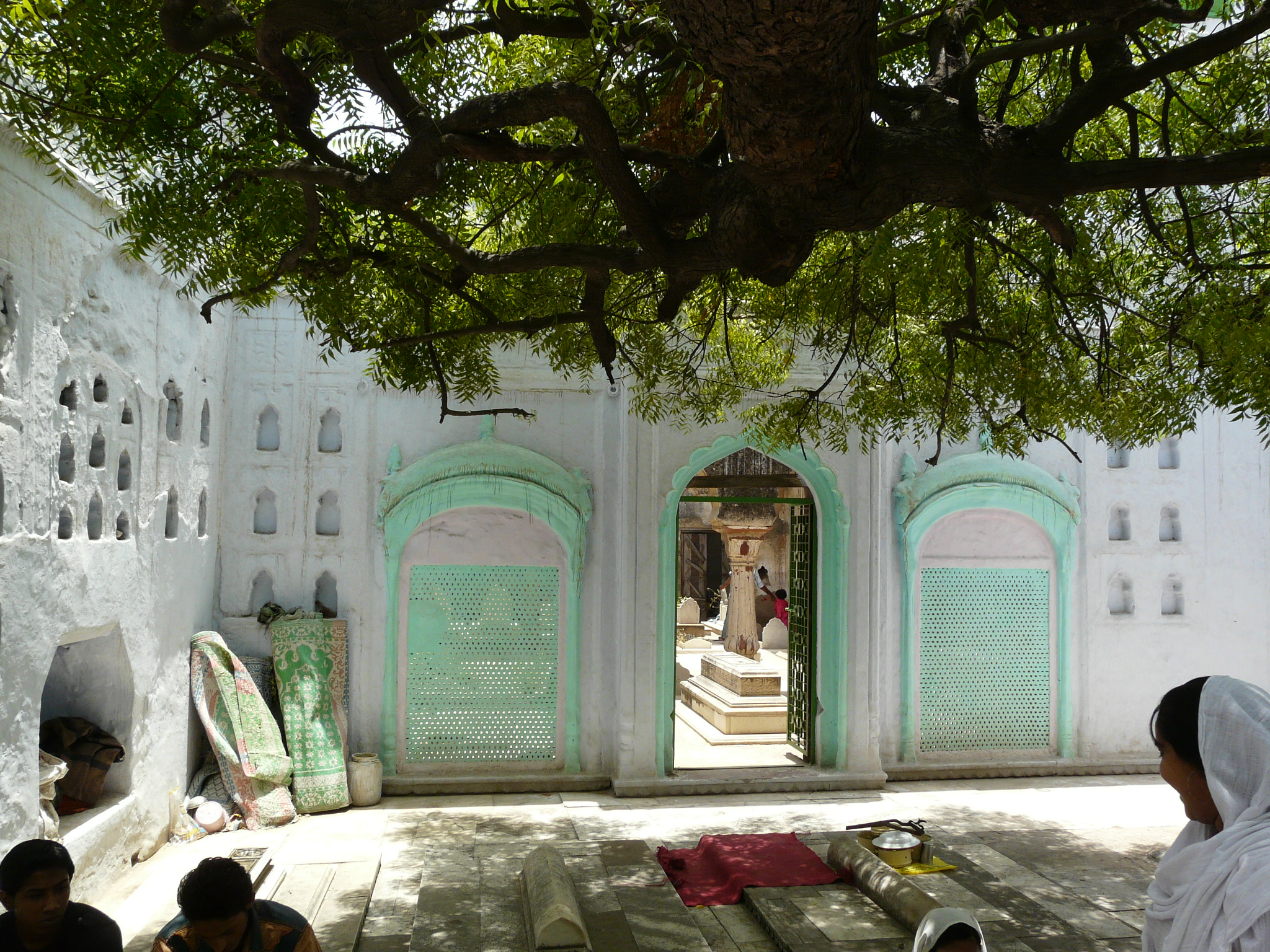
Entrance to grave enclosure within Qutb al-Din Bakhtiyar Kaki's dargah compound.

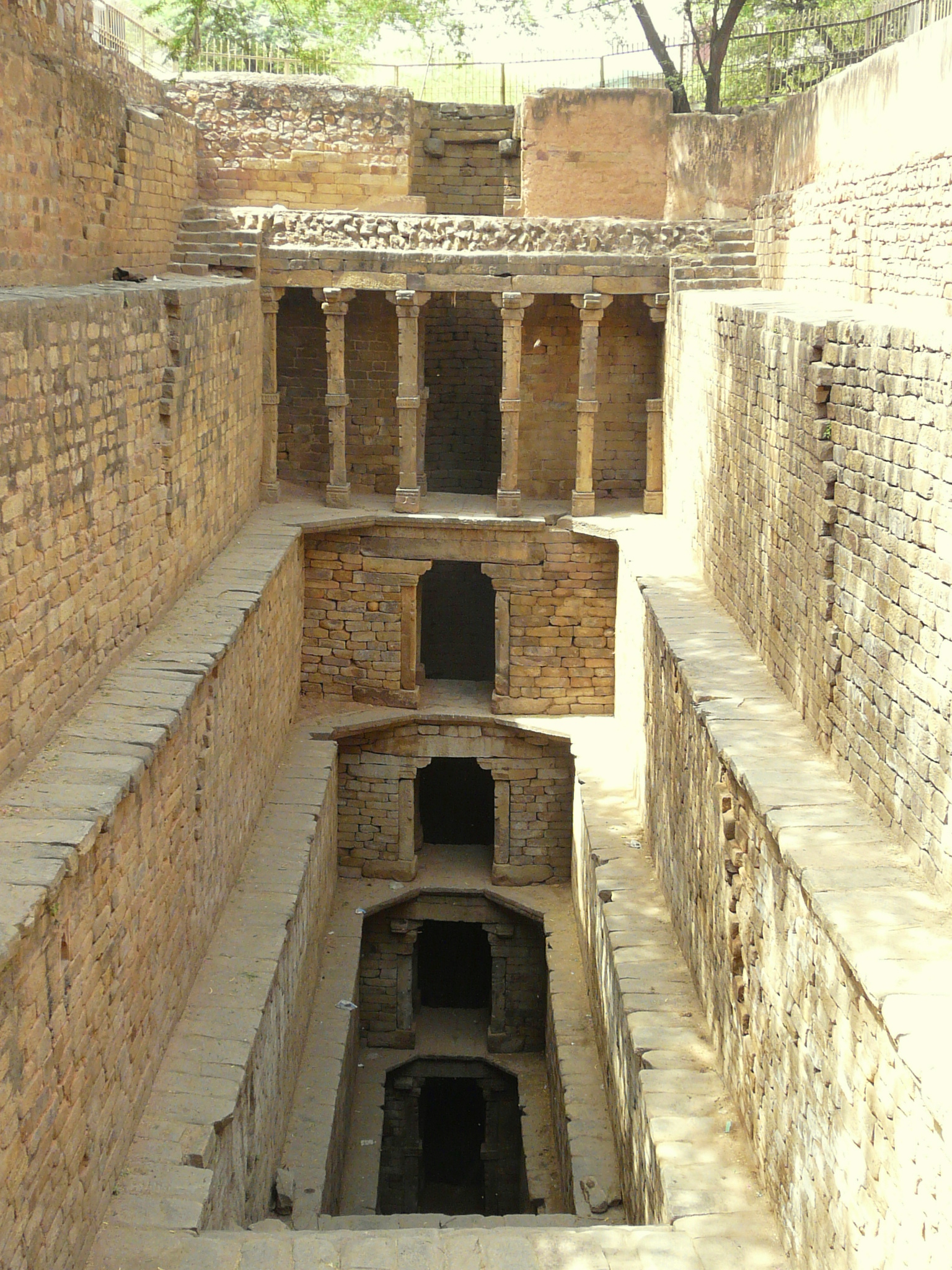
Gandhak ki Baoli, a stepwell in Mehrauli, built by Iltutmish for the saint.

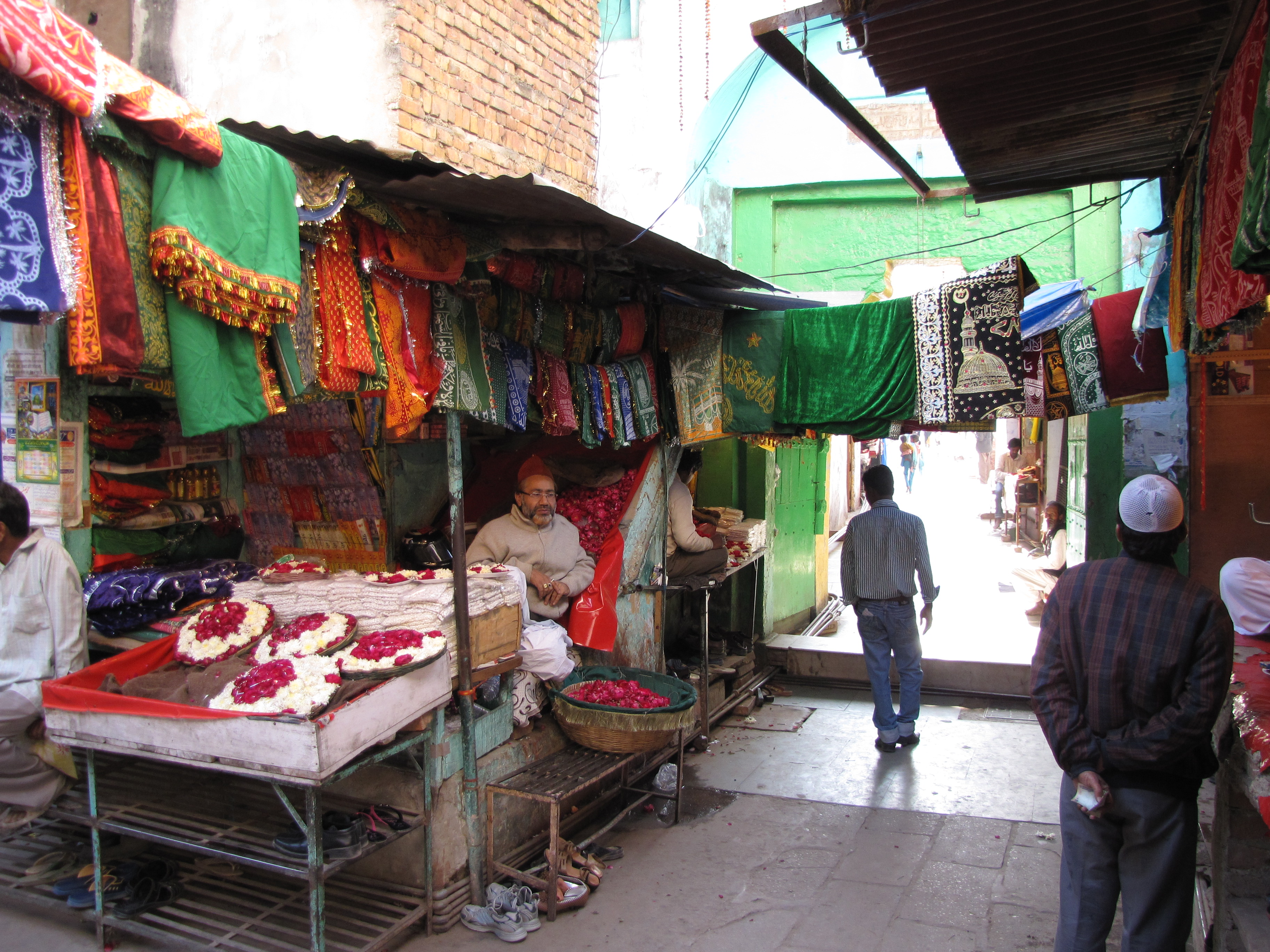
Entrance to dargah complex.

== See also ==
- Turabul Haq Dargah
- Mu'in al-Din Chishti
- Ashraf Jahangir Semnani
