= Naqqar khana =

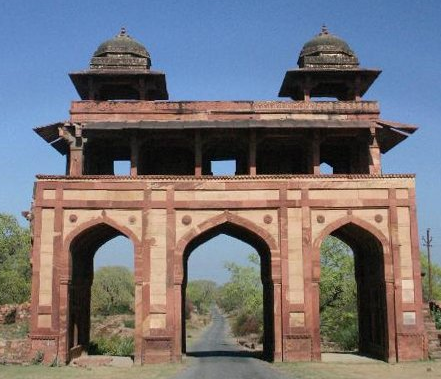
Naqqar Khana near Fatehpur Sikri, Delhi.

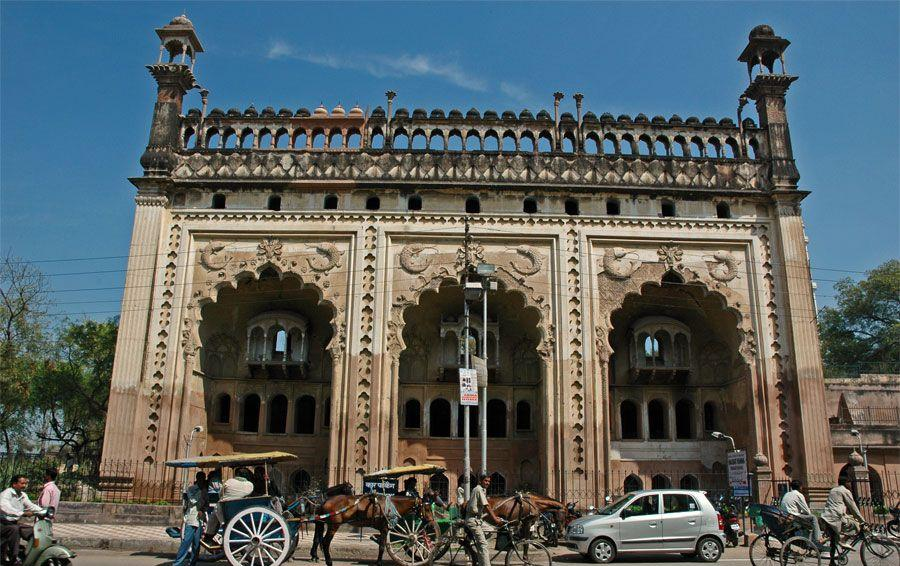
Naubat Khana at Bara Imambara, Lucknow.

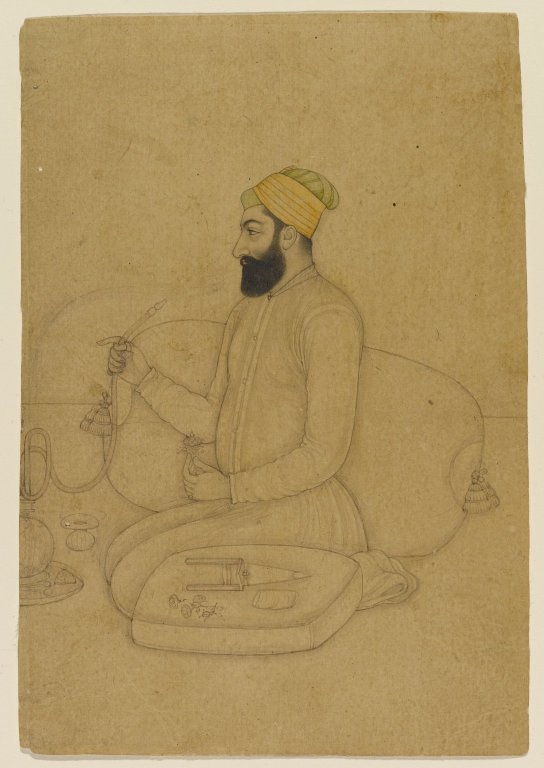
Portrait of Mirza Dakhani Nabut Khan, Brooklyn Museum

Naqqar Khana (Hindi: नक़्क़ार ख़ाना, Urdu: نقّار خانہ) or Naubat Khana (Hindi: नौबत ख़ाना, Urdu: نوبت خانہ) is a term for a drum house or orchestra pit during ceremonies. The name literally means drum (Naqqar/Naubat)-house (Khana). They are a distinct sign of Mughal architecture and were constructed under areas their influence in India, Pakistan and nearby countries.

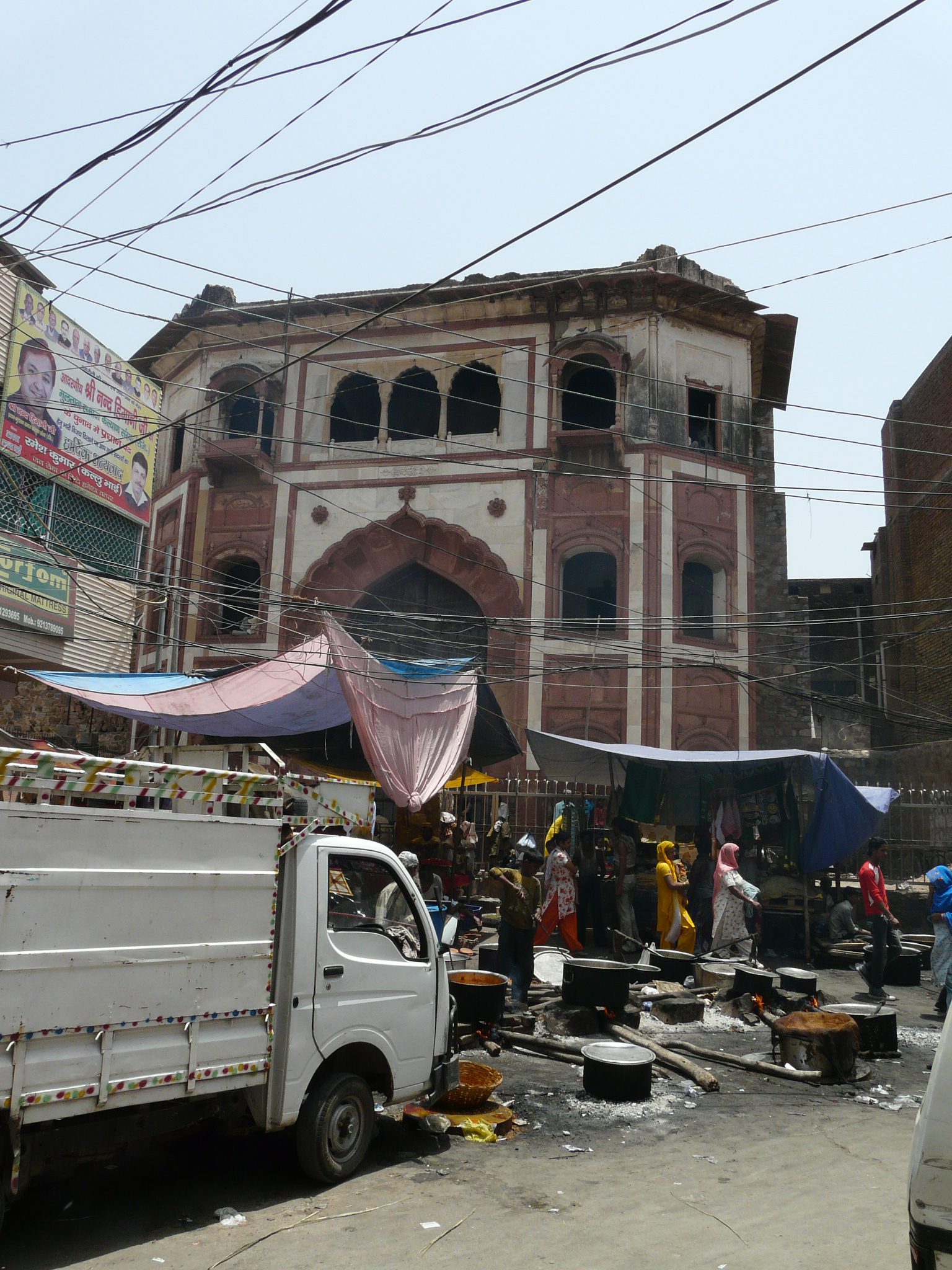
Naubat Khana of Zafar Mahal (Mehrauli) in Delhi

Bismillah Khan's family had played shehnai for generations in Naqqar Khanas overlooking palaces and temples which enabled their music to be heard across the countryside.

== Important locations ==
=== Red Fort ===
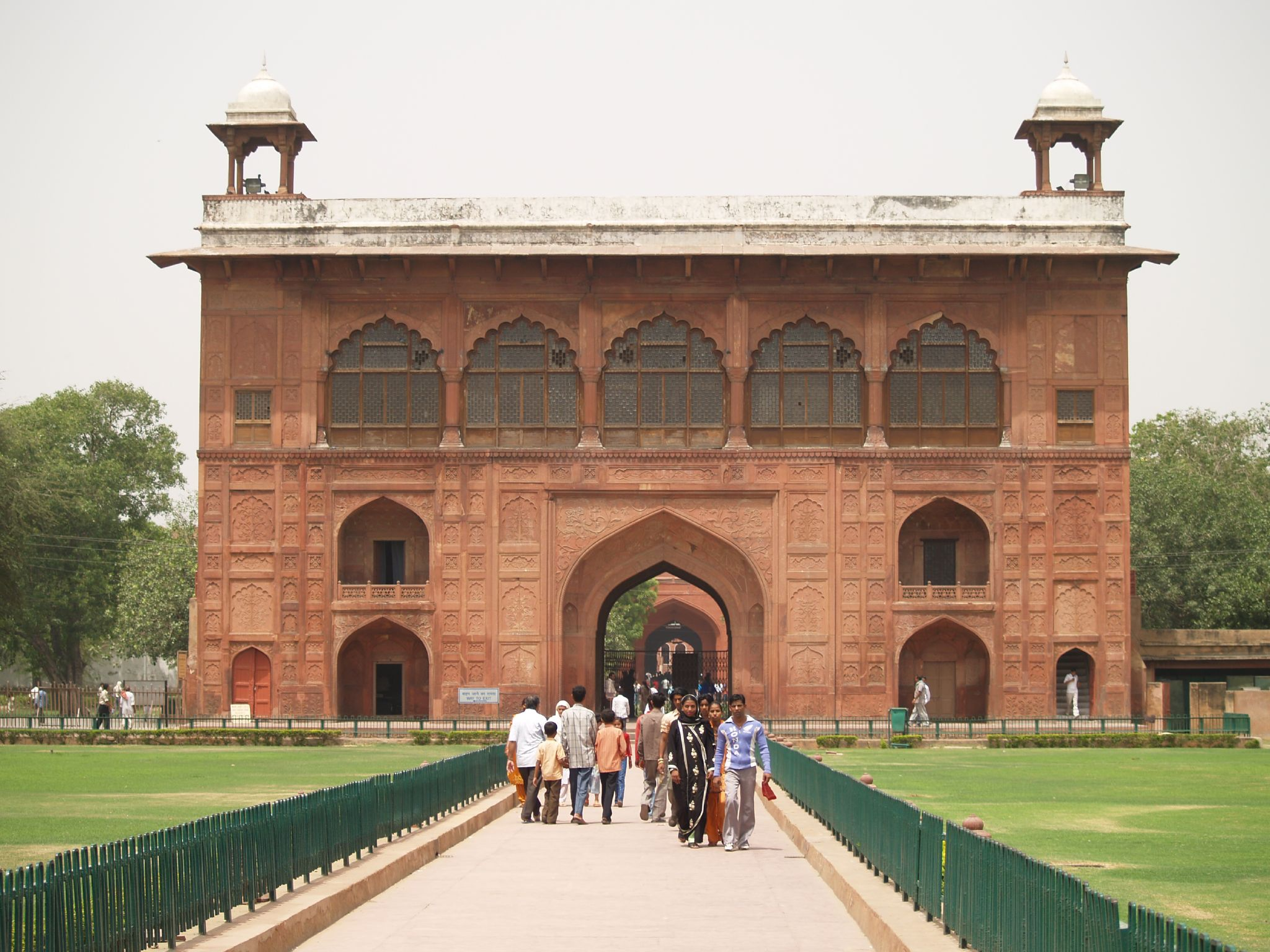
Naqqar Khana in Red Fort

The pavilion named Naubat Khana in Red Fort in Delhi is near the entrance on the eastern side of the ten pillars lane, next to a different pavilion where royal palanquins and other paraphernalia were placed. It housed 18 kinds of musical instruments that used to form part of the royal entourage.

It was constructed in 1636 CE by the Mughals. After the end of their patronage, Naubat Khana fell into a state of disrepair and remained in that state for almost a century until a Britisher named George Fisher restored it in 1858 for the new Zilla School (district school). After the end of British Raj, the place became dilapidated. The American Mission declined to take it as a gift due to its poor condition. The government used it as the police headquarters for some time, but currently it serves as a middle school.

Recently, one of its side was painted white (from the original red) by Archaeological Survey of India as it is thought to be its original color.

=== Taj Mahal ===
The Taj Mahal complex has two Naubat Khanas overlooking the pool in the Charbagh garden.
