= Moti Masjid (Mehrauli) =

Mosque in Mehrauli, Delhi, India

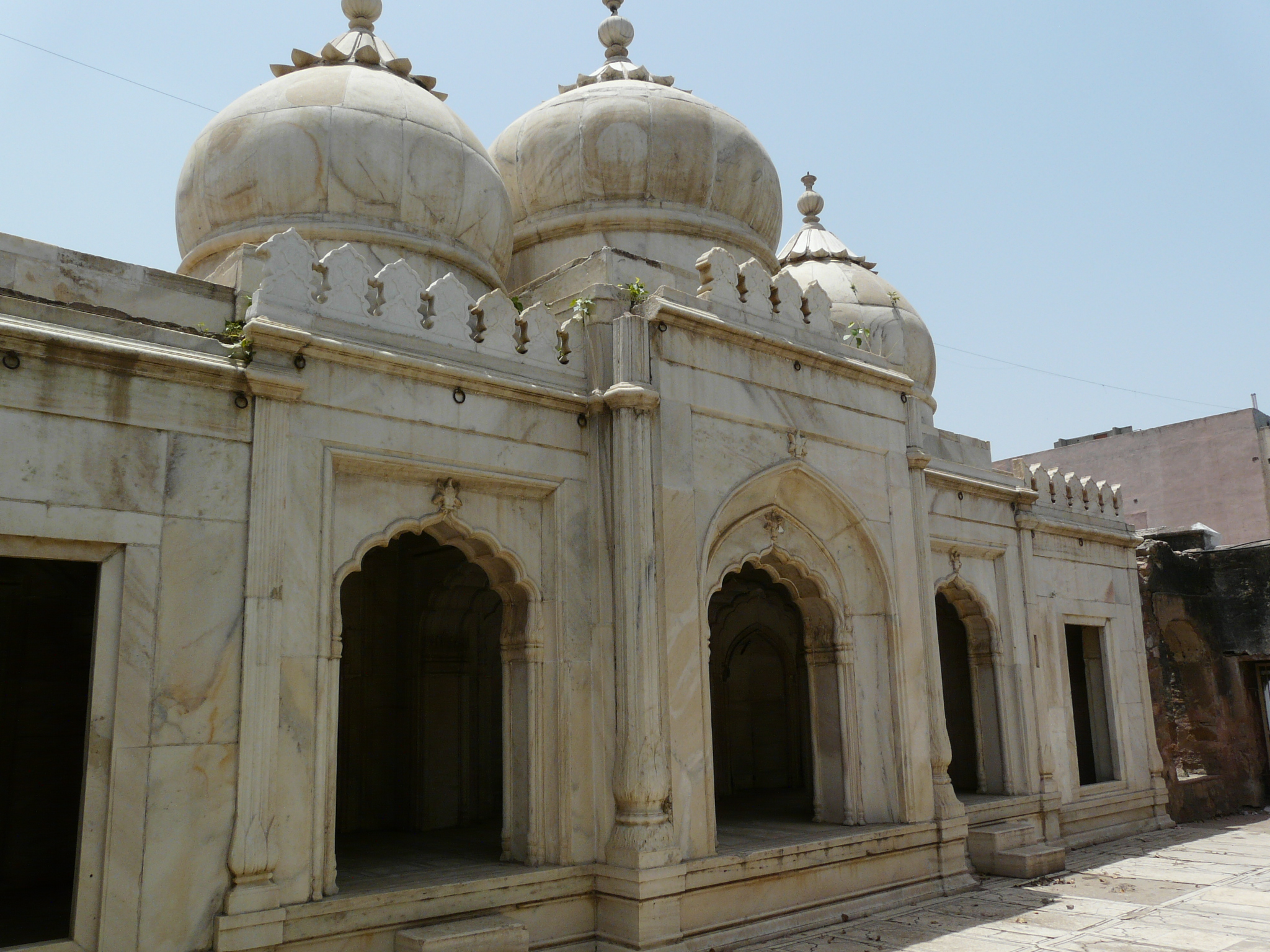
- The mosque façade in 2009

- Location of the mosque in Delhi

Religion
- Affiliation: Islam
- Ecclesiastical or organisational status: Mosque
- Status: Active

Location
- Location: Mehrauli, South Delhi, Delhi NCT
- Country: India
- Coordinates: 28°31′09″N 77°10′49″E

Architecture
- Type: Mosque architecture
- Style: Mughal
- Completed: 1709

Specifications
- Dome: Three
- Materials: White marble

The Moti Masjid (lit. 'Pearl Mosque') is an 18th-century Mughal mosque located in Mehrauli, in the South Delhi district of India. Named for its white marble, the mosque was constructed during the reign of Bahadur Shah I, in the vicinity of the dargah of Qutbuddin Bakhtiar Kaki.

== Location ==
The Moti Masjid is located in Mehrauli, to the west of Qutbuddin Bakhtiar Kaki's dargah. Adjacent to the mosque is a burial enclosure containing the graves of several 18th and 19th-century emperors, such as Bahadur Shah I, Ahmad Shah, Shah Alam II, and Akbar II.

== History ==
The Moti Masjid was built in 1709, during the reign of Mughal emperor Bahadur Shah I. The mosque is typically considered to have been constructed by Bahadur Shah; however, Dadlani argues that it is more likely the mosque was built by a family member or deputy of the emperor. The construction of the mosque in the vicinity of Qutbuddin Bakhtiar Kaki's dargah is reflective of the unprecedented Mughal patronage at the dargah beginning with Bahadur Shah I.

During communal uprisings in the partition era, the Moti Masjid was attacked, despite being a protected monument. The mosque's marble minars were torn off and smashed. This was amidst the occurrence of similar attacks on several other Islamic religious sites in Delhi, as part of larger anti-Muslim violence in the city.

== Architecture ==
The Moti Masjid in Mehrauli is the last example in the Mughal tradition of providing small marble-faced mosques. The mosque is a single-aisled prayer hall of five bays. This is a departure from the previous Moti Masjid in the Red Fort, which is double-aisled. The façade of the mosque bears three scalloped archways, with a pishtaq in the centre. The structure is topped by three domes, resting on constricted necks. Each corner of the east central bay is lined by balustrade-like columns.

The mosque is surrounded by enclosure walls; one of these walls is shared with that of the dargah, while the southern wall opens to the burial enclosure, also made of marble.

== See also ==
- Islam in India
- List of mosques in India
- List of Monuments of National Importance in Delhi
