= Mirza Salim =

- Shahzada of the Mughal Empire
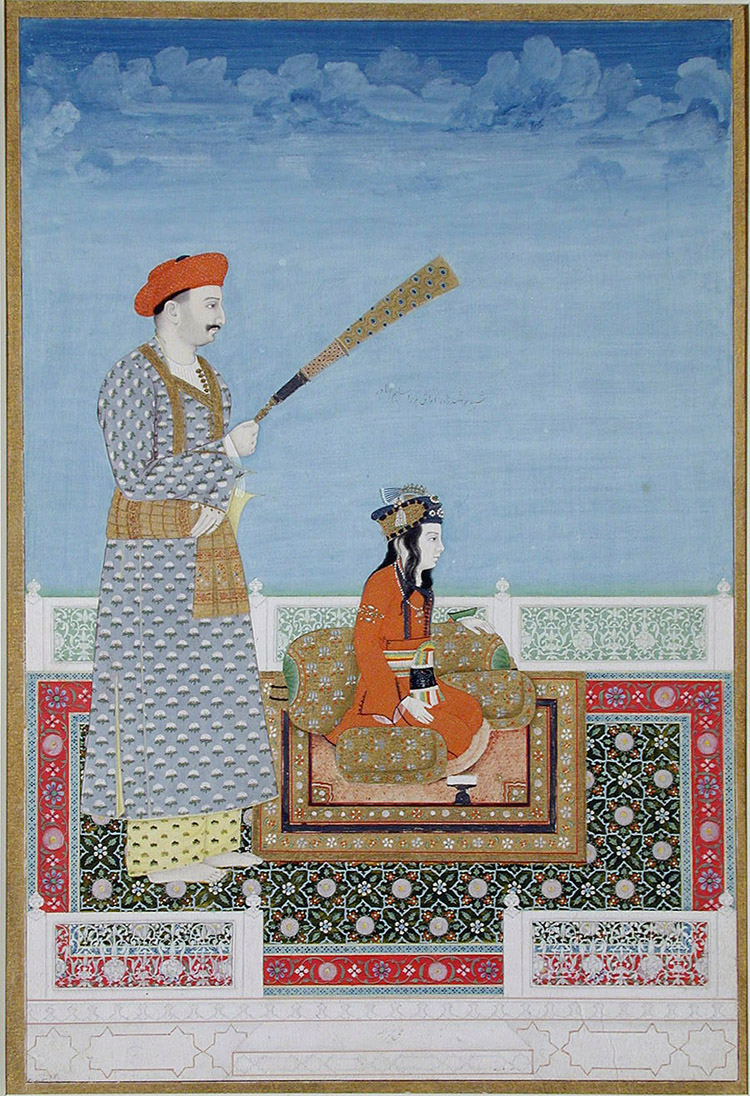
- Mirza Salim (seated) while Tarbiyat Khan waves the fan
- Born: 1799; Red Fort, Delhi, Mughal Empire
- Died: 8 September 1836 (aged 36–37); Old Delhi, Mughal Empire
- Wives: Nawab Malika Sultan-uz-Zamani Begum Sahiba; Nawab Khushru-uz-Zamani Begum Sahiba
- Issue: Mirza Gouhar Shah Bahadur; Mirza Hamid Shah Bahadur; Husain Jahan Begum Sahiba; Zainat un-nisa Begum Sahiba
Names
- Mirza Muhammad Salim Shah
- House: Timurid
- Father: Akbar Shah II
- Mother: Mumtaz-un-Nissa
- Religion: Sunni Islam

Mirza Salim (1799 – 8 September 1836) (also known as Shahzada Mirza Muhammad Salim Shah) was a son of Mughal emperor Akbar II and his consort Mumtaz-un-Nissa Begum. He was a younger brother of Mirza Abu Zafar (the future Emperor Bahadur Shah II), former Crown Prince Mirza Jahangir, and Mirza Jahan Shah. He was Mirza Abu Zafar's favourite brother; Salim always agreed with Mirza Abu Zafar's decisions and always supported him.

== Biography ==
His father, Akbar II, ruled over a rapidly disintegrating empire between 1806 and 1837. It was during his time that the East India Company dispensed with the illusion of ruling in the name of the Mughal monarch and removed his name from the Persian texts that appeared on the coins struck by the company in the areas under their control.

His brother, Mirza Abu Zafar, was not their father's preferred choice as his successor. One of Akbar Shah's queens, Mumtaz Begum, had been pressuring him to declare her son, Mirza Jahangir, as his successor with success, but in 1812, the East India Company exiled Jahangir after he attacked their resident, Sir Archibald Seton, in the Red Fort.

Akbar Shah was pressured by the British to appoint Mirza Salim as Heir Apparent on 26 September 1835, but he refused to cave to their demands, which is why Mirza Salim's older brother, Mirza Abu Zafar Muhammad Bahadur, took the throne as Emperor Bahadur Shah II upon Akbar Shah's death in 1837.

== Family ==
He married twice; both wives were princesses of the Imperial family and his cousins. He had two sons and two daughters. He died in 1836 in the Red Fort, before the events of 1857 that ushered in the end of his dynasty and the rule of the Imperial family of India.
