= Nazim =

Nazim or variant spellings may also refer to:

- Subahdar or nazim, governor of a province in the Mughal Empire
- Nazim (Pakistan), coordinator of a city or town in Pakistan
- Nazim (given name), including a list of people with the given name
  - Nirmala Devi, born Nazim, Indian actress and singer
- Nazim (surname), including a list of people with the surname

== See also ==
- Nazimabad, a suburb of Karachi, Sindh, Pakistan
- Nizam (disambiguation)
  - Nizam of Hyderabad, monarch of the Hyderabad State
- Nazm, a genre of Urdu poetry
