= Phool Walon Ki Sair =

Annual celebration of florists in Delhi, India

Phool Waalon Ki Sair
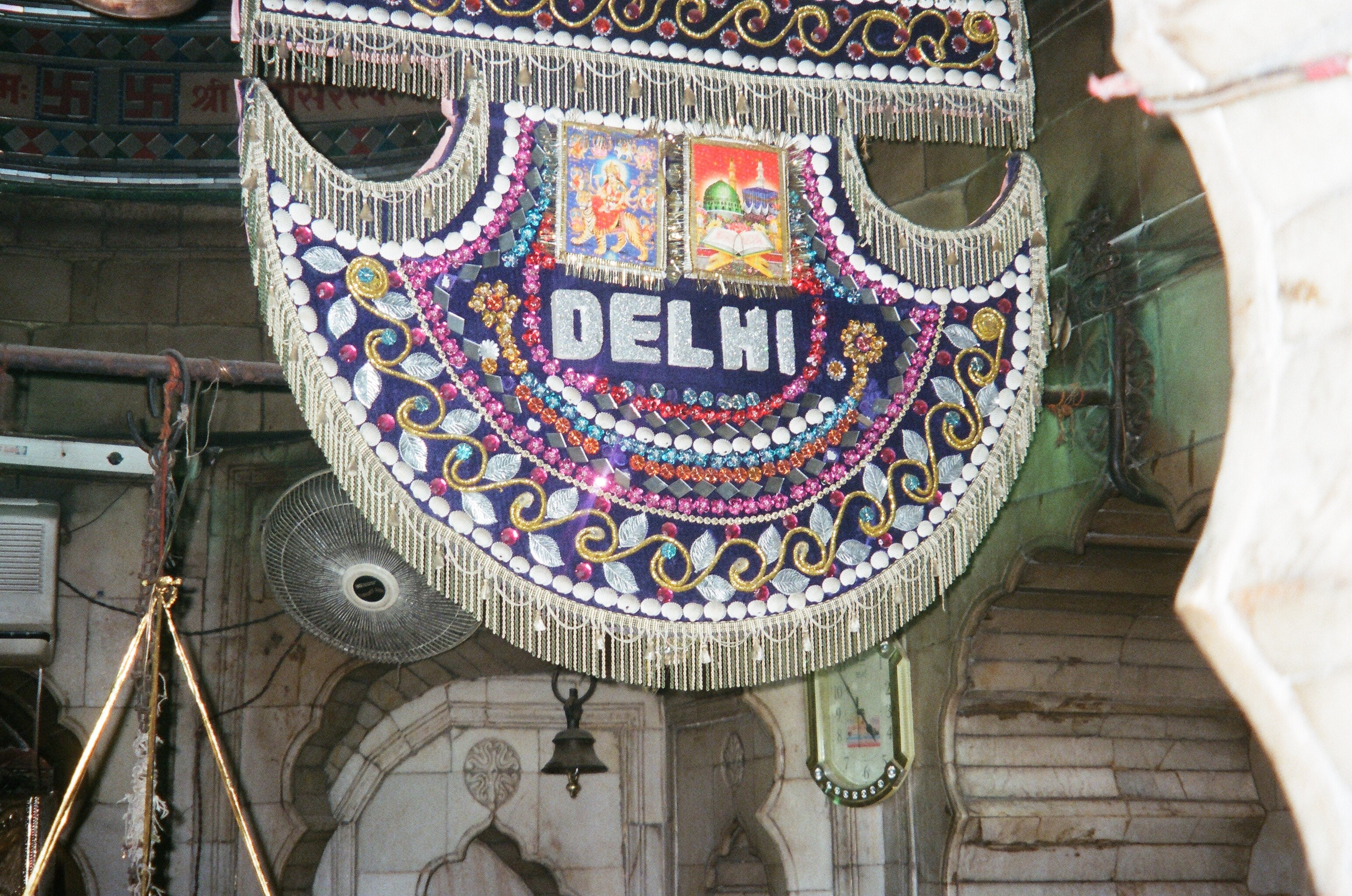
- A floral Pankha (fan) over the Idol of Yogmaya in the sanctum sanctorum, Yogmaya Mandir
- Dates: September
- Locations: Mehrauli, New Delhi
- Founded: 1814
- Website: phoolwaalonkisair.co.in

Phool Waalon Ki Sair meaning "procession of the florists" is an annual celebration by the flower sellers of Delhi. It is a three-day festival, generally held in the month of September, just after the rainy season in the region of Mehrauli. It is seen as an example of the composite culture of Delhi, which has bolstered an environment of communal harmony in the city, and even today the festival is celebrated by both Hindus and Muslims alike.

This secular festival involves a procession, led by shehnai players and dancers, and bearing large floral fans, pankhas, to Yogmaya Temple, the shrine of Devi Jog Maya, and winds through Mehrauli Bazar, to reach the dargah of 13th century Sufi saint, Khwaja Bakhtiyar Kaki.

Also known as Sair-e-Gul Faroshan during this three-day festival, the flower sellers pray for a better flower season in the coming year by offering big fans, pankhas, embroidered with flowers to both shrines.

Just as when it was first conceived and had the Mughal Emperor as its patron, these days the festival has the Prime Minister of India as its main patron; Jawaharlal Nehru who revived and inaugurated the festival in 1962, and all the PMs hence, have equally participated in the festival. Another tradition is to offer a similar floral pankha to the President of India, Chief Minister of Delhi, and also the Lt. Governor of the city. Recent additions are the cultural troupes from various states of India, which perform songs, dances, and drama at the main function which is held at 'Jahaz Mahal' in Mehrauli, located in a corner of 'Hauz Shamsi' and is believed to have been built in Lodhi dynasty era, takes the festival beyond its vision of communal harmony to that of national integration

== Origin ==
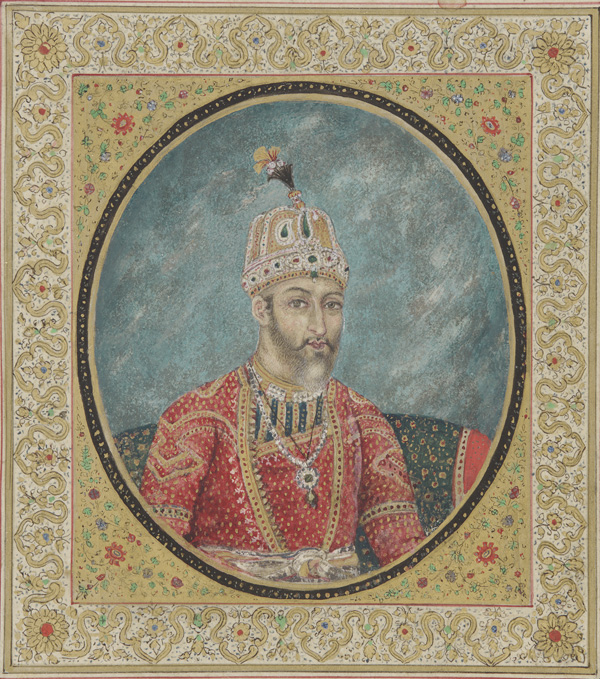
Akbar Shah II

The origin of Phool Waalon Ki Sair goes to 1812, during the reign of the Mughal emperor Akbar Shah II (r. 1808 -1837). Akbar Shah was not pleased with his eldest son Siraj Uddin “Zafar” (Bahadur Shah Zafar II) and wanted to nominate his younger son Mirza Jahangir as the heir Apparent (Wali-Ahad). This move was not liked by the then British Resident in the Red Fort, Sir Archibald Seton. Once Mirza Jahangir who was a reckless youth of 19 insulted Seton in open court and called him Loolu. The British Resident somehow did not react to this insult as probably he did not understand the meaning of Loolu. After a few days, when Mirza Jahangir was merrymaking on the roof of Naubat Khana in Red Fort, Archibald Seton was coming from the Darbar after an audience with Resident. Mirza Jahangir fired a shot at the Resident from the roof of Naubat Khana. Seton escaped but his orderly was killed. For this act of his, Mirza Jahangir was exiled to Allahabad under orders of the British Resident.

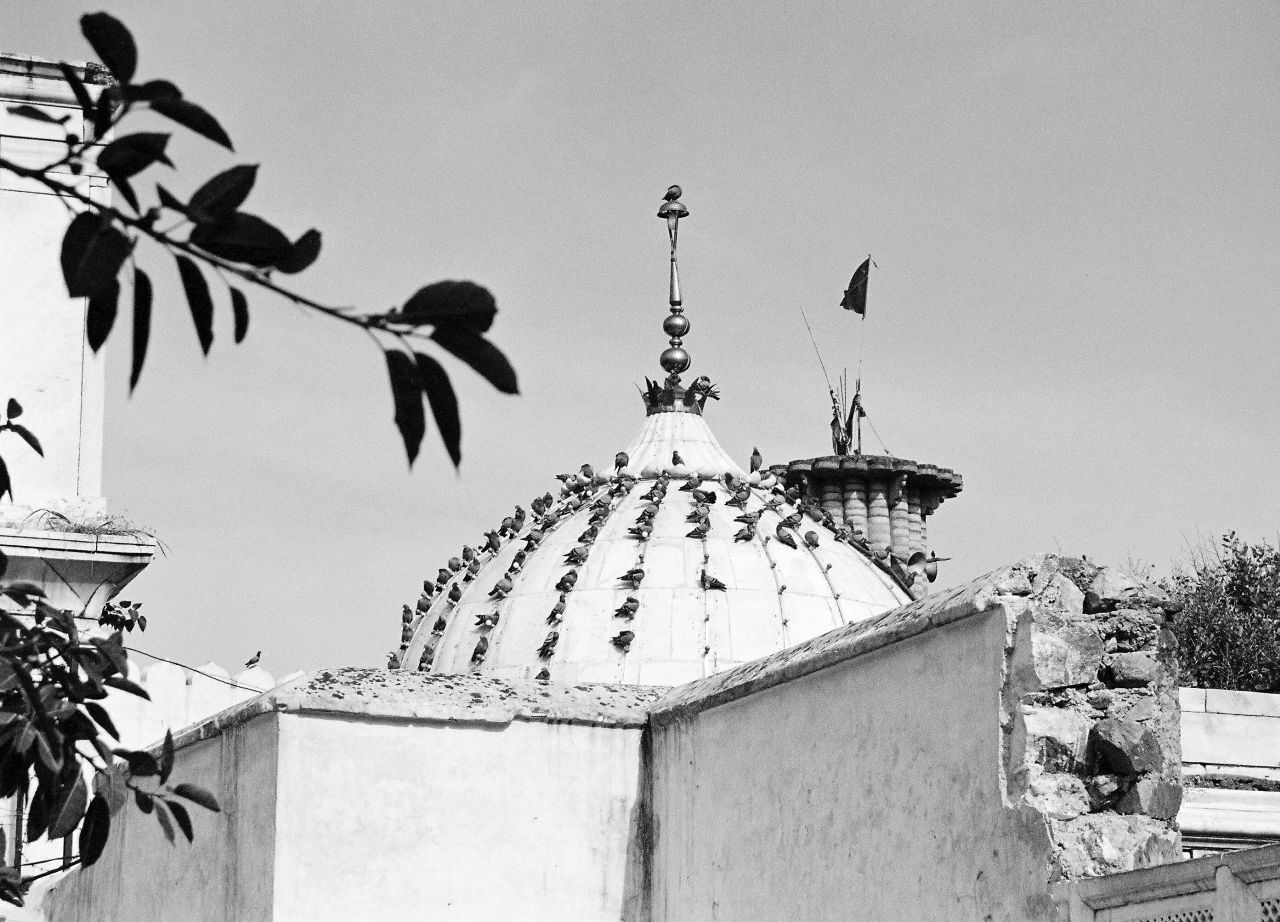
Dargah of Qutbuddin Bakhtiar Kaki, Mehrauli

The mother of Mirza Jahangir Queen Mumtaz Mahal Begum, was distraught and took a vow that if her son was released from Allahabad she would offer a chadar of flowers at the dargah of Khwaja Bakhtiar ‘Kaki’ at Mehrauli. After a couple of years, Mirza Jahangir was released and like a devout lady Mumtaz Mahal Begum went to Mehrauli to redeem her vow. With her, the Imperial Court also shifted to Mehrauli and so did the entire population of Delhi. For 7 days all sorts of merrymaking continued at Mehrauli with Jhoolas (swings) in the mango groves, cock fighting and bull baiting, kites flying, wrestling, and swimming bouts. Amidst all this merrymaking with great pomp and show, a chadar made of flowers was offered at the Dargah of Khwaja Bakhtiar Kaki. The Mughal king was secular-minded and under his orders floral offering in the shape of a floral pankha was offered at the famous Yogmaya Temple which is also in Mehrauli.

Seeing the response of the people and sensing the enthusiasm generated, it was decided that the festival will be held annually after the rains and people of all communities will offer pankha and chadar at the Dargah of Khwaja Bakhtiar Kaki and pankha and floral offering at Yogmayaji temple. The Darbar was also shifted to Mehrauli for the 7 days of the Festival. The Festival reached its pinnacle during the reign of Siraj-U-ddin "Zafar", the last Mughal emperor also known as Bahadur Shah “Zafar”. Bahadur Shah "Zafar" went to celebrate "Phool Waalon Ki Sair" even in 1857 when Delhi was under siege of the British. This was the last "Phool Waalon Ki Sair" under the Mughals.

== Celebration ==
The people of Delhi carry flowers from the Chandni Chowk to Mehrauli- to the shrine of Sufi saint Hazrat Qutubuddin Kaki and the Devi Jogmaya Mandir. The total distance of the Sair (walk) is about 32 km. One can read Delhi's soul in this journey of 32 km from Chandni Chowk to Mehrauli. Along the highway were scattered life-giving baolis and sarais to quench the thirst of travelers, built by kings and commoners. Arab ki Sarai.. Qutub ki Sarai... Parsi temple ki sarai..Yogi ki Sarai..Sheikh ki Sarai...Badli-ki-Sarai..Katwaria Sarai etc. There used to be all-pervading ambience of fun and merriment what with qawwalis, and kathak being performed on the streets. Fire dancers also performed on the streets during the procession and added a mystic allure to the proceedings.

As it passed through the streets of Mehrauli, where the Mughal courts used to shift after the rainy season, Mughal Emperor, Akbar Shah II, used to enjoy the procession from the balcony of Zafar Mahal in Mehrauli and watched it move towards the shrine of Sufi Saint Qutbuddin Kaki and later to Yogmaya Temple

== During British Raj ==
The Festival continued to be celebrated even after 1857 revolt by the British Deputy commissioner who was the highest government functionary in Delhi with the help of some prominent citizens. The Festival was stopped by the British during the Quit India Movement of Mahatma Gandhi in 1942 as part of their suppression of the movement.

== Revival of the festival ==
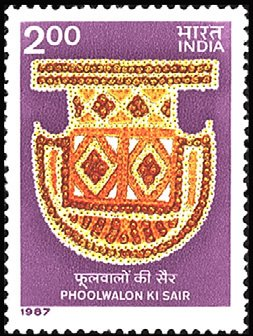
Indian Postage Stamp of Phoolwalon Ki Sair

In about 1961, the Prime Minister of India Jawaharlal Nehru attempted to revive the festival. He asked Noor Uddin Ahmed, the mayor of Delhi, Taimur Jahan Begum, scion of the Mughal dynasty and Yogeshwar Dayal, scion of a prominent Delhi family to revive the festival. "Phool Waalon Ki Sair" was revived in 1961-62, when Nehru joined the festivities on 6 September 1962

Pandit Jawahar Lal Nehru took great interest and came to Mehrauli on every "Phool Waalon Ki Sair" until his death in 1964. During the premiership of Indira Gandhi, all Indian states were requested to participate in the festival.

Since its revival in 1962, the Festival is organized every year by the Anjuman Sair-e-Gul Faroshan, a society registered under the Societies Registration Act.

== See also ==
- Religious harmony in India
