= Mirza Nali =

Mughal crown prince

- Born: Mirza Muhammad Nali; 2 November 1784
- Died: 8 October 1860 (aged 75)
- Children: Mirza Mubarak; Mirza Abu Bakr; Mirza Jalaluddin

Mirza Nali (born Mirza Muhammad Nali, Shahzada (Begzada) of the Mughal Empire 1784–1860), was the Crown Prince before Bahadur Shah II. He was the son of Akbar Shah II, and would later become an outlaw after the Sepoy Mutiny of 1857. He took refuge in parts of Hindustan.

His father Akbar II died in the evening on 28 September 1837. Bahadur Shah Zafar ascended to the throne of Delhi. Bahadur Shah was born in 1775 and, at the time of his enthronement, he was 62 years of age. He was a very modest, well spoken, Sufi poet. His father had tried to pass on the title to his younger brother Mirza Salim, also known as Mirza Jahangir. However, Mirza Salim hated the British and called the Resident Stein by the mocking name of "Lulu". He also shot the resident and, as a consequence, was exiled to Allahabad. The British, as a result, were opposed to making Mirza Jahangir the Crown Prince. After that, Shah Alam Badshah tried to make Mirza Nali the Crown Prince; this too failed, and, in the end, Bahadur Shah ascended the throne.

Mirza Nali House of Timur Born: 2 November 1784 Died: 6 October 1860
Titles in pretence
Preceded by Akbar Shah II	— TITULAR — GurkhaneMirza; Prince of the Imperial Mughal Line; Mirza Nali; 1784–1860	Succeeded by Jalaluddin Mirza
