= Indian War Memorial Museum =

Museum in the Red Fort in Delhi, India

Coordinates: 28.655767°N 77.240988°E

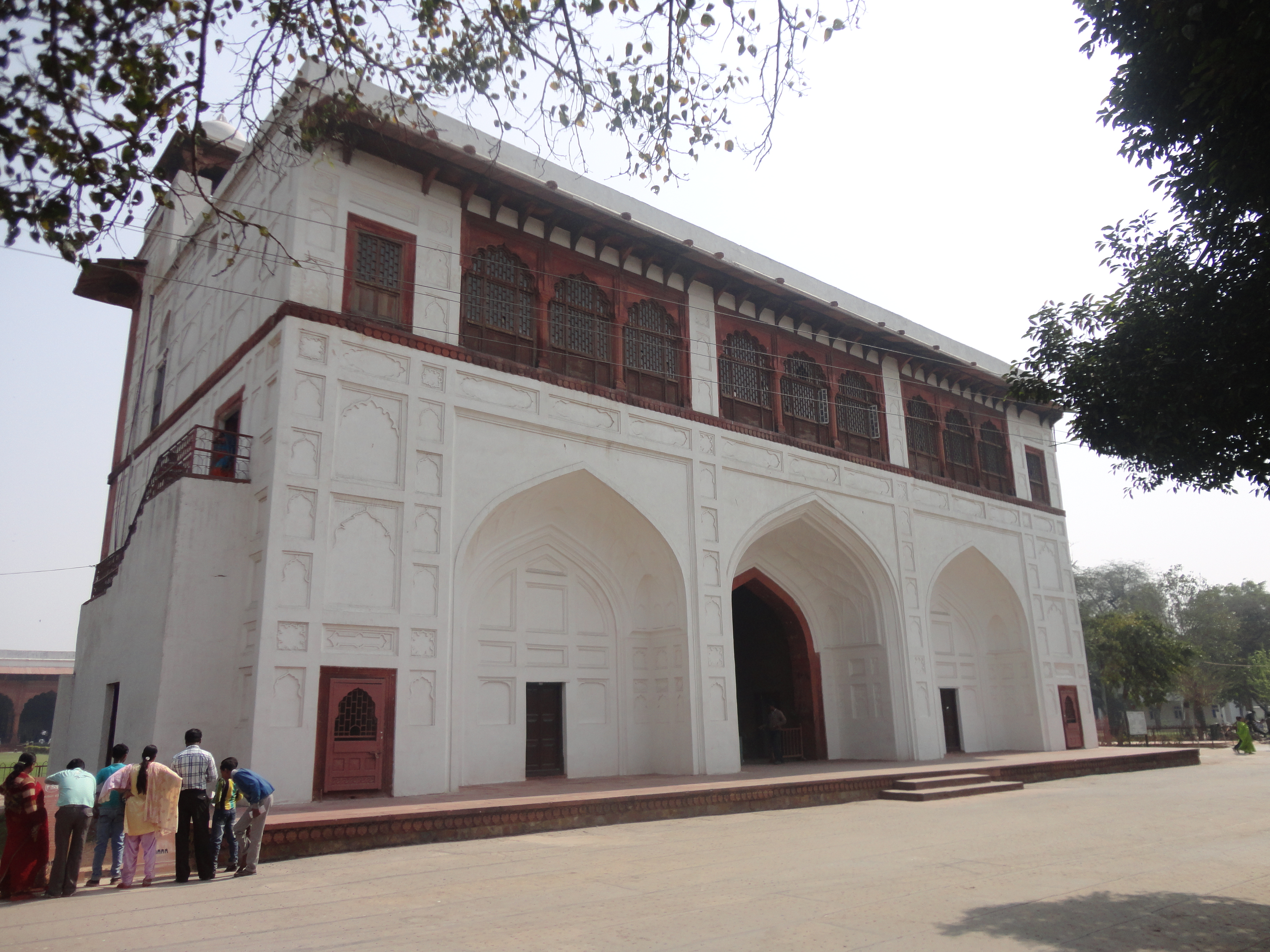
- The museum is housed in the Naubat Khana of the Red Fort
- Established: 1919
- Location: Naubat Khana of the Red Fort in Delhi, northern India.
- Type: war memorial museum

The Indian War Memorial Museum is in the Naubat Khana of the Red Fort in Delhi, northern India. It was built in 1919 as a tribute to commemorate the soldiers who had joined the First World War in India or abroad on behalf of the British Empire.

== Exhibition ==
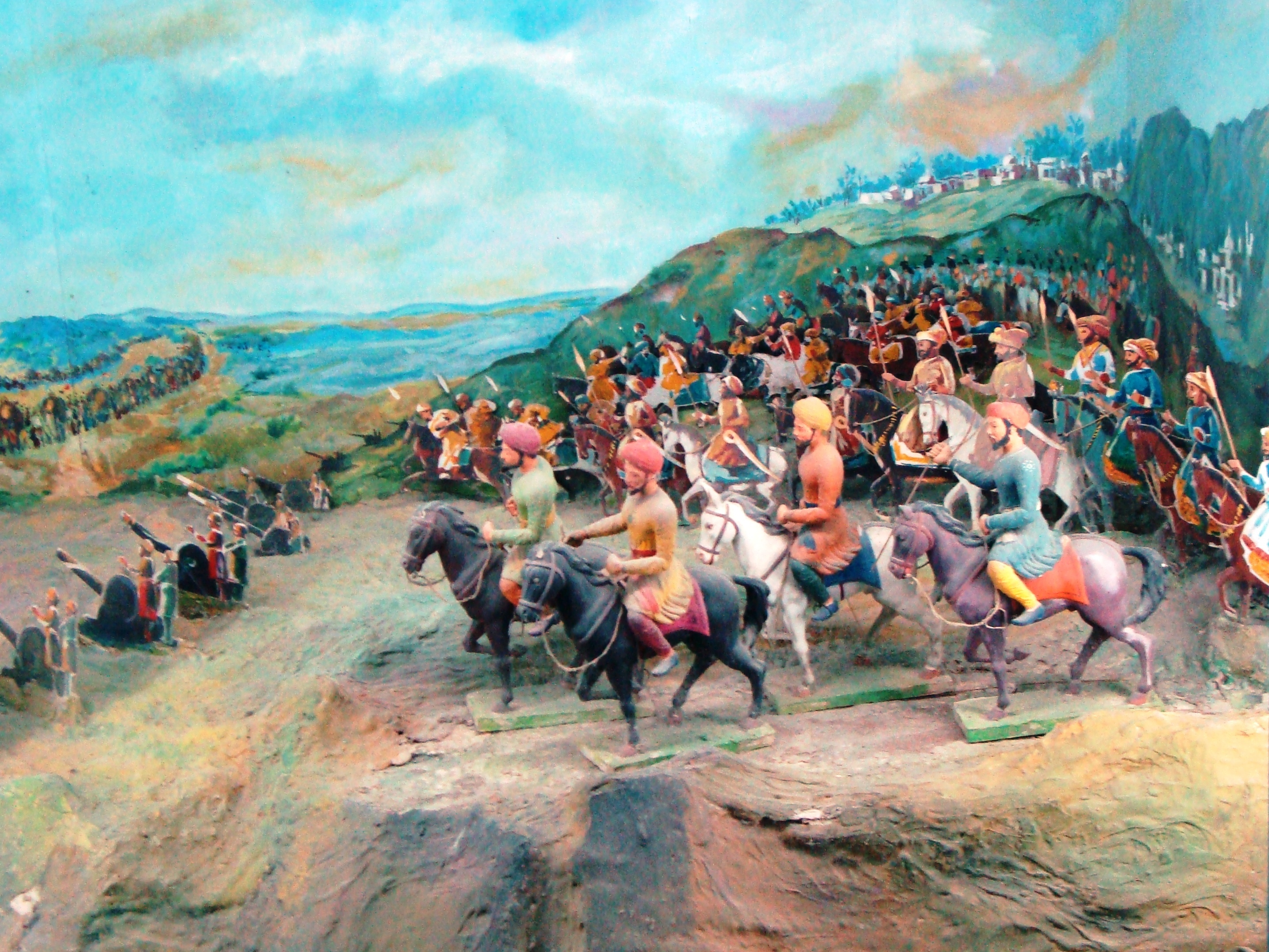
Diorama of the first battle of Panipat in 1526

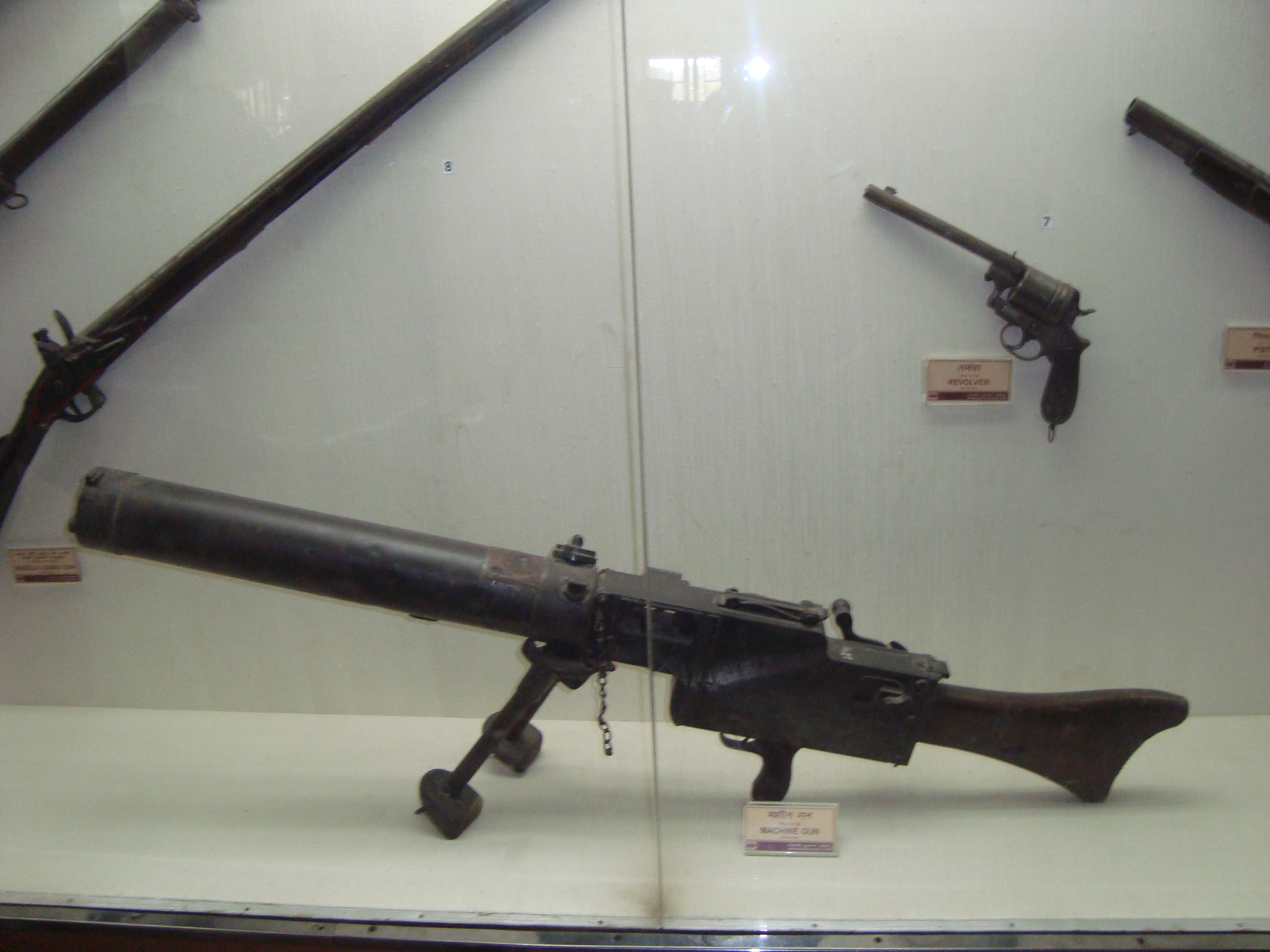
Weapons displayed in the museum

The museum is located on the first and second floors of the drum house. It contains several galleries about India's military history during the First and Second World Wars.

Items on display are a diorama of the Battle of Panipat (1526), in which Babur defeated the forces of Ibrahim Lodi and established the Mughal Empire.

Further objects on display are traditional weapons such as daggers and gupti, arms, and helmets. The advent of industrialisation brought in new weapons, such as machine guns and grenades.

Various badges, ribbons, uniforms of Turkish and New Zealand army officers, and flags are also on display.

The dress of Maharaja Pratap Singh of Idar, a renowned soldier and military man, is displayed, which includes the kurta (long shirt), a belt, trouser, turban with zari work, shoes and inscribed sword with sheath.
