= Mirza Babur =

Mughal prince

Shahzada Mirza Muhammad Babur Bahadur Baig (1796 – 13 February 1835) also known as Mirza Babur was a Mughal prince and son of Mughal emperor Akbar II. According to Theophilos Metcalfe, the British governor of Delhi, he was the fifth surviving son of Akbar II, and his three oldest sons, Mirza Mahmud, Mirza Kamran and Mirza Kabir-ul Mulk were living in the imperial palace in 1853.
