= Nazim (surname) =

Nazim also spelled Nadhem, Nadhim, Nadhum or Nazem; Arabic: ناظم) is an Arabic-based surname. As the pronunciation of the Arabic letter Ẓāʾ is often closer to a strong "d" sound, therefore the name's pronunciation differs based on the spoken varieties of Arabic and consequently in its transcription.

Nazim as a surname or middle name may refer to:

== Surname ==
=== Nazem ===
- Farzad Nazem, Iranian businessman

=== Nazim ===
- Mohammad Nazim, Indian model and television actor
- Nazriya Nazim (born 1994), Indian film actress and producer
- Saleem Nazim (1955–2025), Pakistani field hockey player

=== Nadhim ===
- Ali Nadhim (born 1981), Iraqi Greco-Roman wrestler

== Middle name ==
- Mirza Nazim Shah (1820–1902), son of Mughal emperor Akbar II and his consort Gumani Khanum
- Mustafa Nadhim Jari (Arabic: مصطفى ناظم جاري, born 23 September 1993 in Al-Diwaniyah, Iraq) is an Iraqi football player
- Shahriar Nazim Joy, Bangladeshi actor, writer, and director

== See also ==
- Nazim (given name)
- Nazim (disambiguation)
