= Nazim (given name) =

Nazim (also spelled Nezim, Nadhem, Nadhim, Nathum or Nazem; Arabic: ناظم or Turkish: Nazım) is an Arabic masculine given name. The pronunciation of the Arabic letter Ẓāʾ is often closer to a strong "d" sound; thus, the name's pronunciation differs based on the spoken varieties of Arabic and consequently in its transcription.

The meaning of the name Nazim in Arabic is poet or author.

== Nazim ==
- Nazim Pasha (1848–1913), Chief of Staff of the Army of the Ottoman Empire during the First Balkan War
- Nazim Baykishiyev (1948–2025), Azerbaijani artist and stage designer
- Nazim Burke (born 1956), politician from the island of Grenada
- Nazim al-Kudsi (1906–1998), Syrian President
- Nazim al-Qubrusi (1922–2014), Cypriot-born leader of the Naqshbandi-Haqqani Sufi Order
- Nazim Aliyev (born 1963), Azerbaijani footballer
- Nâzım Hikmet Ran (1902–1963), Turkish poet, playwright, novelist and memoirist
- Nazim Huseynov (born 1969), Azerbaijani judoka
- Nazim Khaled (born 1986), French songwriter and record producer
- Nazim Panipati (1920–1998), lyricist, film writer and copywriter of Indian and Pakistani films
- Nazim Shirazi, Bangaldesi-American cricketer
- Nazim Hussain Siddiqui (1940–2022), Chief Justice of the Supreme Court of Pakistan
- Nazim Suleymanov (born 1965), Azerbaijani footballer

== Nazım ==
- Nazım Ekren (born 1956), Turkish politician
- Nazım Sangaré (born 1994), Turkish footballer

== Nazem ==
- Nazem Akkari (1902–1985), Lebanese politician
- Nazem Amine (1927–2017), Lebanese wrestler
- Nazem Ganjapour (1943–2013), Iranian footballer
- Nazem Al-Ghazali (1921–1963), Iraqi singer
- Nazem al-Jaafari (1918–2015), Syrian artist
- Nazem Kadri (born 1990), Canadian ice hockey player
- Nazem Sayadi, Lebanese footballer

== Nazeem ==
- Nazeem Bartman (born 1993), South African footballer
- Nazeem Hussain (born 1985), Australian comedian and actor

== Nadhem ==
- Nadhem Abdullah (died 2003), Iraqi murdered during the Occupation of Iraq

== Nadhim ==
- Nadhim Kzar (1940–1973), administrator, politician, head of the Iraqi Directorate of General Security
- Nadhim Shaker (1958–2020), Iraqi footballer
- Nadhim Zahawi (born 1967), British politician

== See also ==
- James Caan (entrepreneur), formerly Nazim Khan, (born 1960), Pakistani-British businessman

== See also ==
- Nazim, Pakistani title
- Nazim (surname)
- Nazim (disambiguation)
- Nazimuddin (disambiguation)
