= Yogmaya Temple, Delhi =

Hindu temple in Delhi, India

Yogmaya Temple
- Jogmai
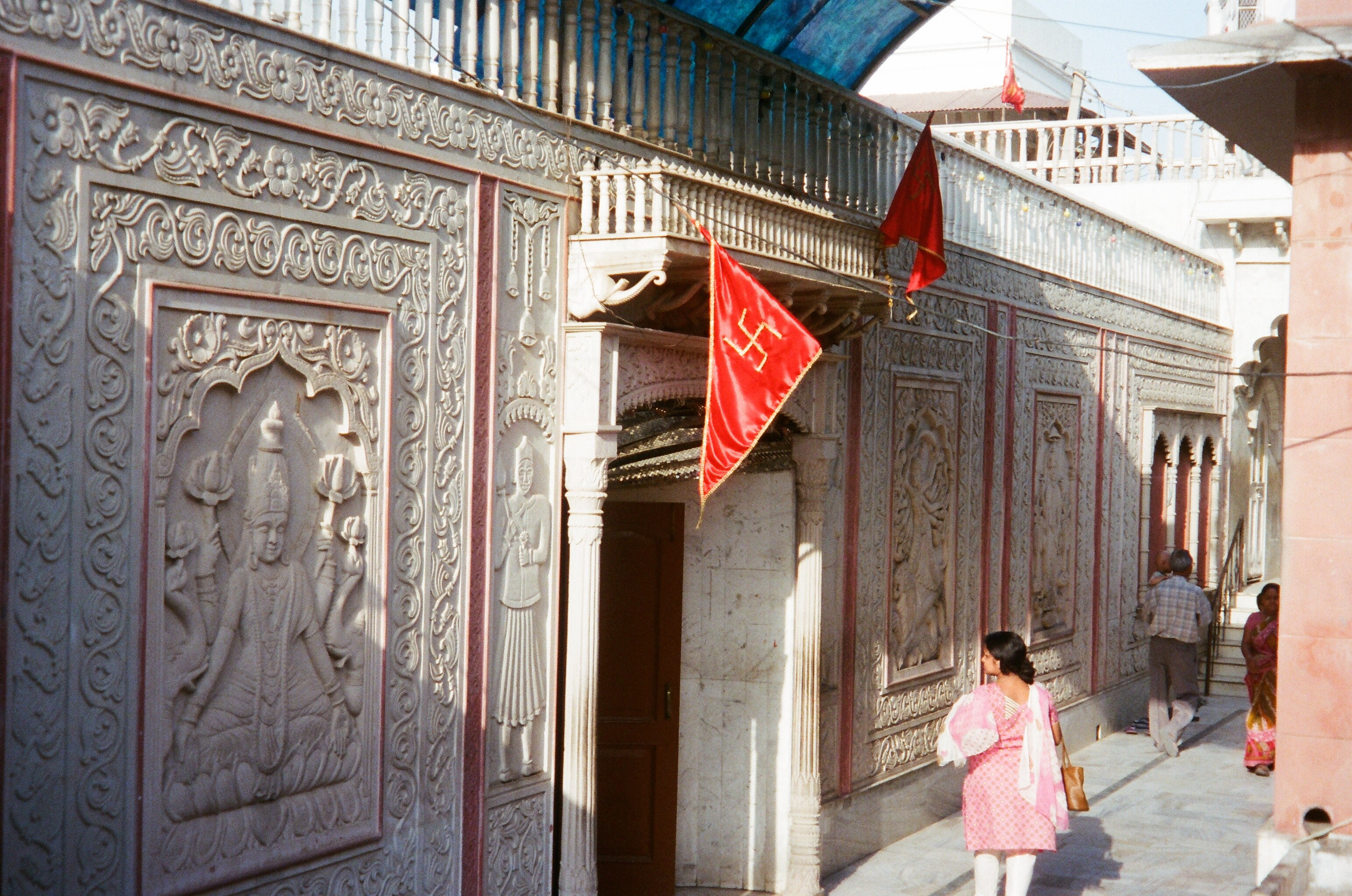
- Entry into the temple precincts

- Location in Delhi

Religion
- Affiliation: Hinduism
- District: South Delhi
- Deity: Yogmaya
- Festival: Phool Walon Ki Sair

Location
- Location: Mehrauli village
- State: Delhi
- Country: India
- Coordinates: 28°31′30″N 77°10′57″E

Architecture
- Type: Hindu temple architecture
- Completed: about 5,253 years ago

Yogmaya Temple, also Jogmaya temple, is a Hindu temple dedicated to the goddess Yogmaya, also considered to be a sister of Krishna as she took avatar as Vindhyavasini, and situated in Mehrauli, Delhi, India, close to the Qutb complex. According to local priests and native records, this is one of those 27 temples destroyed by Mamluks and it is the only surviving temple belonging to pre-sultanate period which is still in use. Hindu king Samrat Vikramaditya Hemu reconstructed the temple and brought back the temple from ruins. During Aurangzeb's reign a rectangular Islamic Style hall was added to the temple. Though its original (300-200 BCE) architecture could never be restored after its destruction by Islamic rulers, but its reconstruction had been carried out repetitively by the locals.

Yogmaya or Jogmaya is considered, an aspect of Maya, the illusionary power of God. The temple is also venue of a large congregation of devotees during the Navratri celebrations.

The present temple was restored in early 19th century and may be the descendant of a much older Devi shrine. Adjacent to the temple lies, a water body, johad, known as Anangtal Baoli, after King Anangpal Tomar, and covered by trees from all sides The temple is also an integral part of an important inter-faith festival of Delhi, the annual Phool Walon Ki Sair.

== History ==
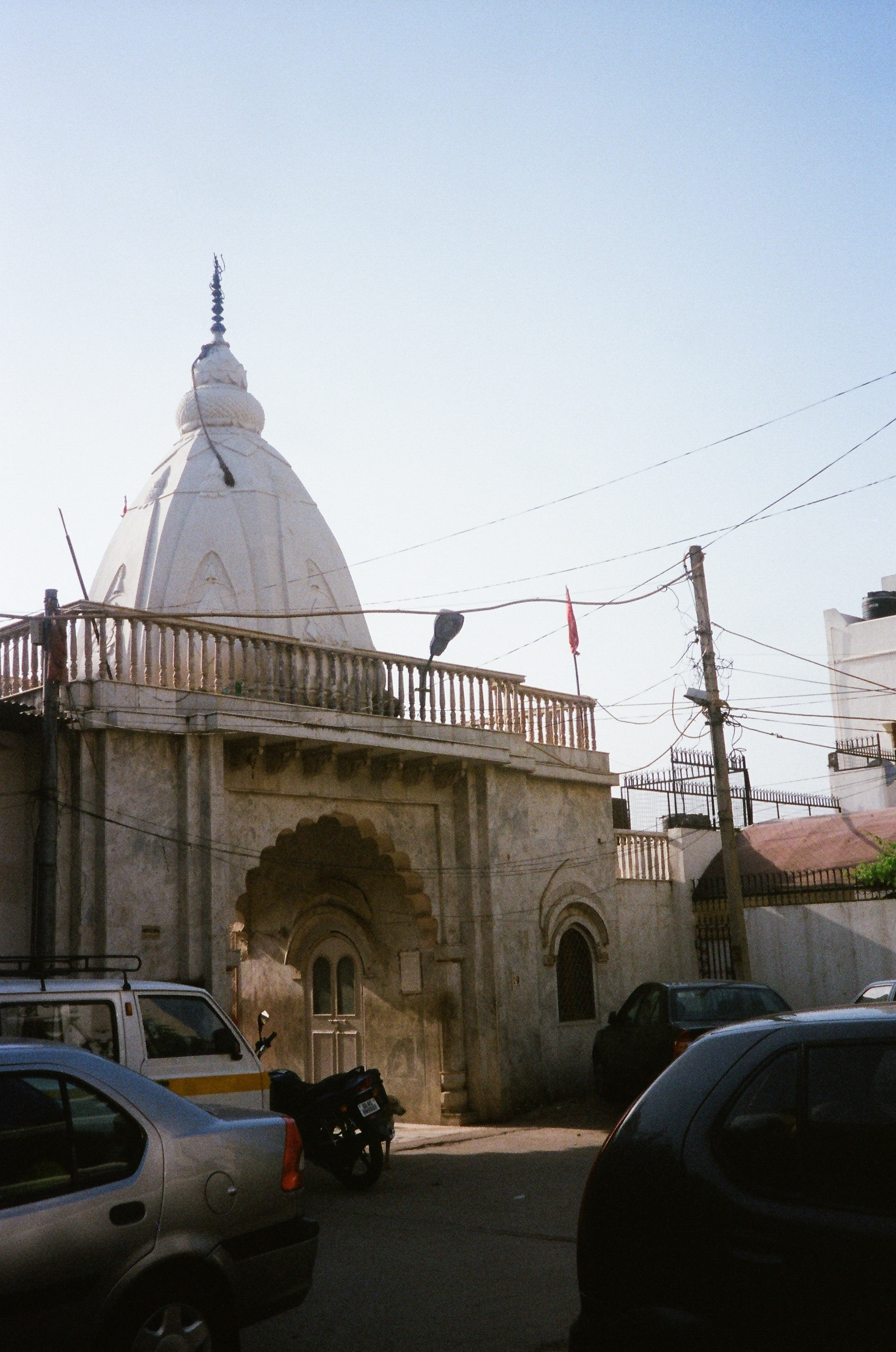
Entrance gate from outside the Yogmaya temple

In 12th-century Jain scriptures, Mehrauli is also mentioned as Yoginipura, after the temple. The temple is believed to be built by the Pandavas, at the end of Mahabharata war. Mehrauli is one of the seven ancient cities that make up the present state of Delhi. The temple has its association with Mughal Emperor Akbar II (1806–37) by Lala Sethmal.

The temple lies 260 yards from the Iron Pillar in the Qutb complex, and within the Lal Kot walls, the first fortress citadel of Delhi, constructed by the Tomar/Tanwar King Anangpal I around 731 CE and expanded by King AnangPal II in the 11th century who also constructed Lal Kot.

== Structure ==
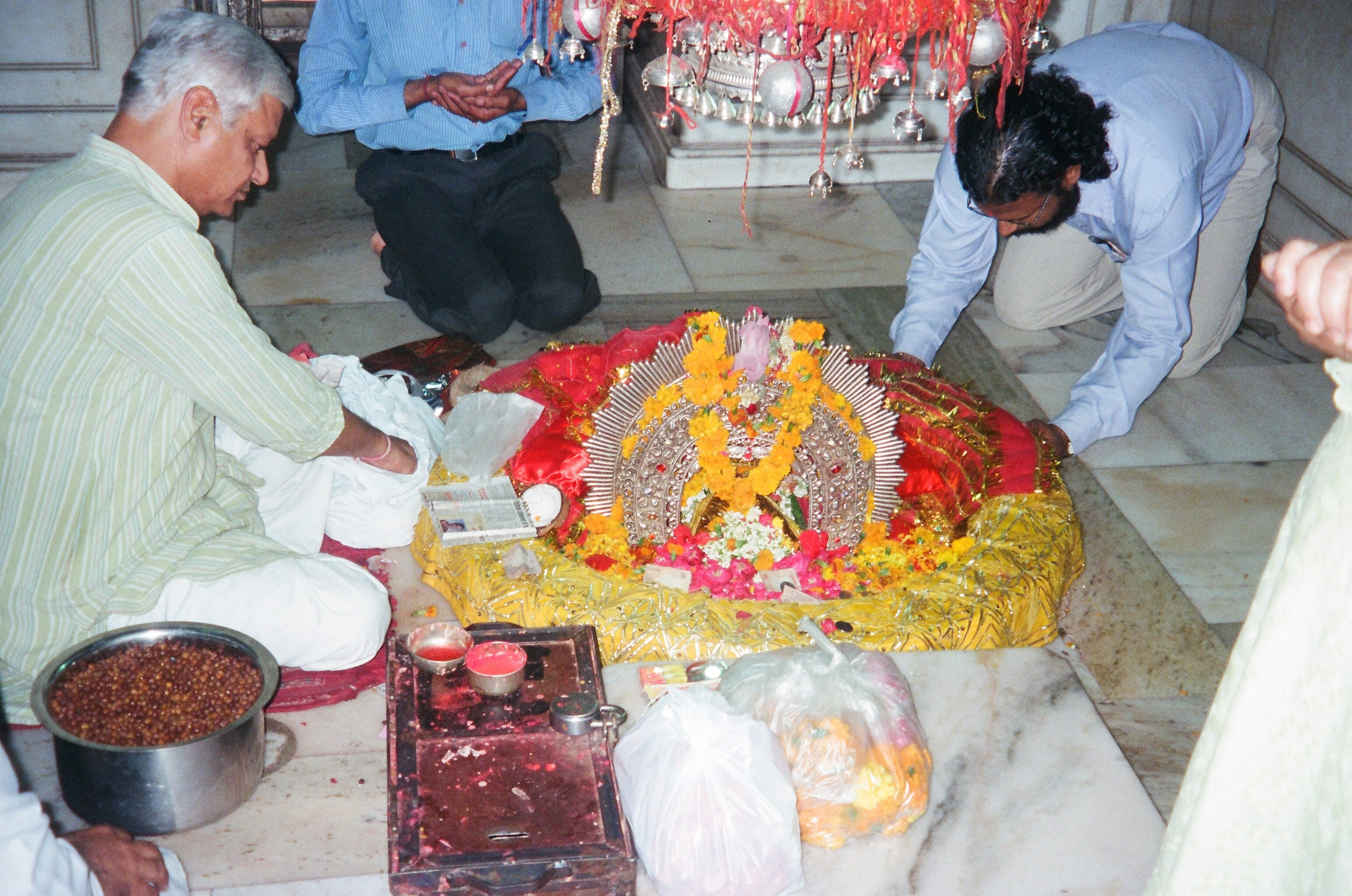
Main chamber (garbha griha) of the temple

The temple rebuilt in 1827 is a simple but contemporary structure with an entrance hall and a sanctum sanctorum that houses the main Idol of Yogmaya made of black stone placed in a marble well of 2 ft (0.6 m) width and 1 ft (0.3 m) depth. The sanctum is 17 ft (5.2 m) square with a flat roof over which a truncated shikara (tower) is built. Apart from this tower, a dome is the other feature seen in the temple (pictured). The idol is covered in sequins and cloth. Two small punkahs (fans) of the same materials are seen suspended over the Idol from the roof. The walled enclosure around the temple is 400 ft (121.9 m) square, with towers at the four corners. Twenty two towers were built within the precincts of the temple at the orders of the Sood Mal, the builder. The floor of the temple was originally made of red stone but since then has been replaced by marble. The main tower above the sanctum is 42 ft (12.8 m) high and has copper plated shikara or pinnacle.

The flowers and sweets offered by the Devotees to the goddess are placed over a marble table of 18 inches square and 9 inches height set in front of the idol in the sanctum floor. Bells, otherwise a part of Hindu temples, are not tolled during the worship of the goddess. Wine and meat are forbidden to be offered at the temple and goddess Yoga Maya is stated to be austere and exacting. An interesting display at the temple premises in the past (but now in an open wall panel) was an iron cage of 8 ft (2.4 m) square and10 ft (3.0 m) in height in which two stone tigers are exhibited. A passage, between the temple and the wall panel has flat roof which is covered with the planks overlaid by bricks and mortar and fixed with bells.

== Goddess ==
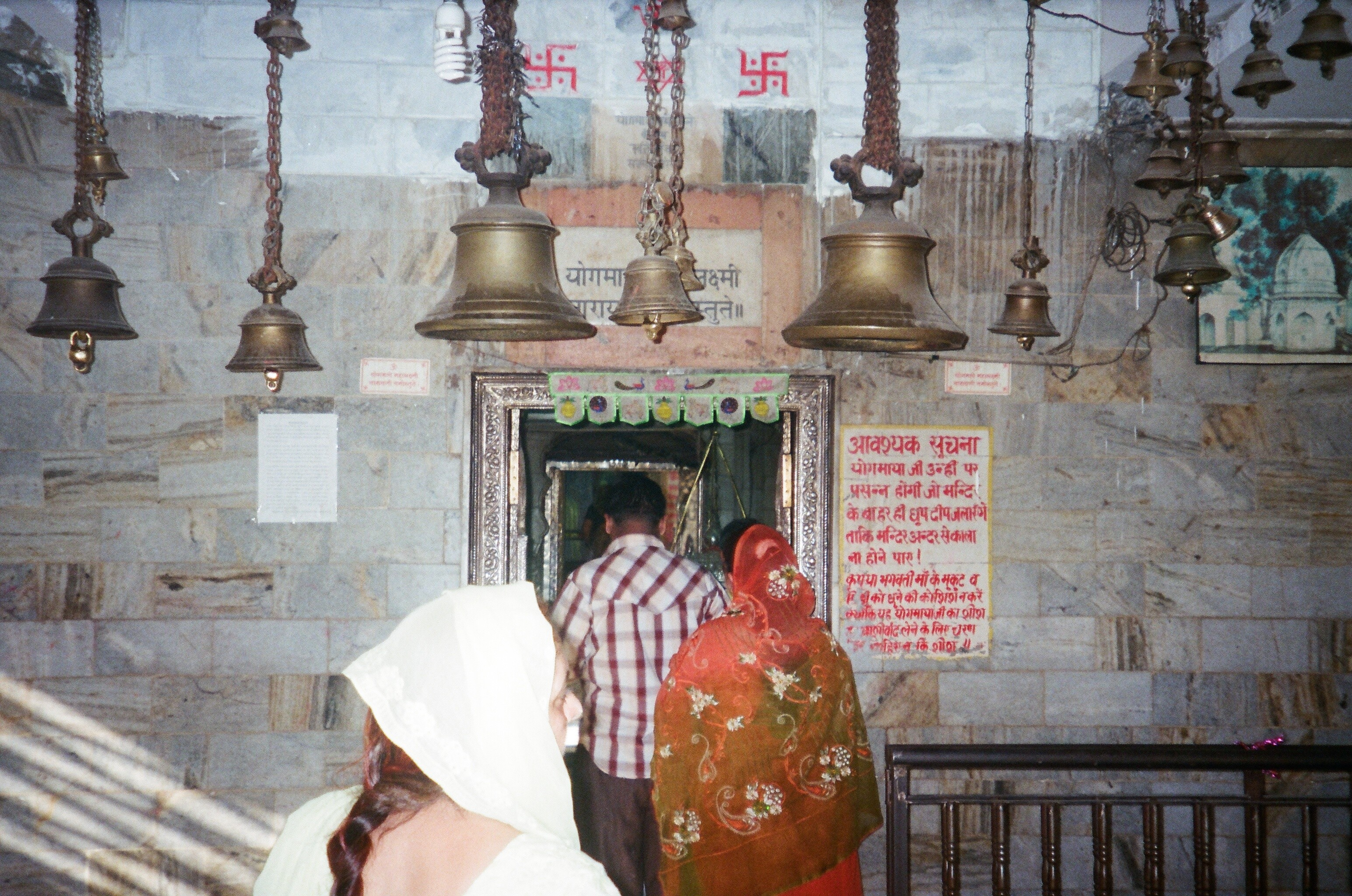
Bells at the entry door

It is believed that the main idol in the temple was that of Yogamaya ( daughter of Yashoda), an incarnation of Durga, born as the sister of Krishna. Kansa, cousin of Devaki (mother of Krishna) and uncle of Yogamaya and Kansa attempted to kill Yogamaya on Krishna Janmastami day when Krishna was born. But Yogamaya, who was cleverly substituted for Krishna, vanished after predicting Kansa's death at the hands of her brother Krishna. Later she reborn as Krishna's younger sister Subhadra.

== Folk legends ==
Another folk legend is that of Mughal Emperor Akbar II's (r. 1806-1837) association with the temple. His wife was distraught at the incarceration and exile of her son Mirza Jehangir who had fired from a Red Fort window at the then British Resident that had resulted in the killing of the bodyguard. Yogamaya had appeared in her dream and the Queen praying for her son's safe return had vowed to place punkah made of flowers at the Yogmaya temple and in the nearby Muslim shrine of Qutbuddin Bhaktiar Khaki. This practice set since then is continued to this day in the name of Phool Walon Ki Sair, a festival held for three days during October every year.

Another important fact about this ancient temple is that for more than 5000 years {i.e. the times when the said temple was built}, the people who live around this ancient temple have been taking care of the yogamaya temple. It is said and believed that all these people who are now more than 200 in number had one common ancestor at point in time who, hundreds of years ago started the practice of taking care of the temple by offering prayers to the goddess which includes doing the shringar of the goddess yogamaya twice a day, cleaning the temple, making and distributing prasad to the devotees visiting the temple and other related things. These 200 odd people who now take care of the temple carrying forward the customs and traditions of their forefathers do it voluntarily and amicably.

== Phoolwalon-ki-sair Festival ==
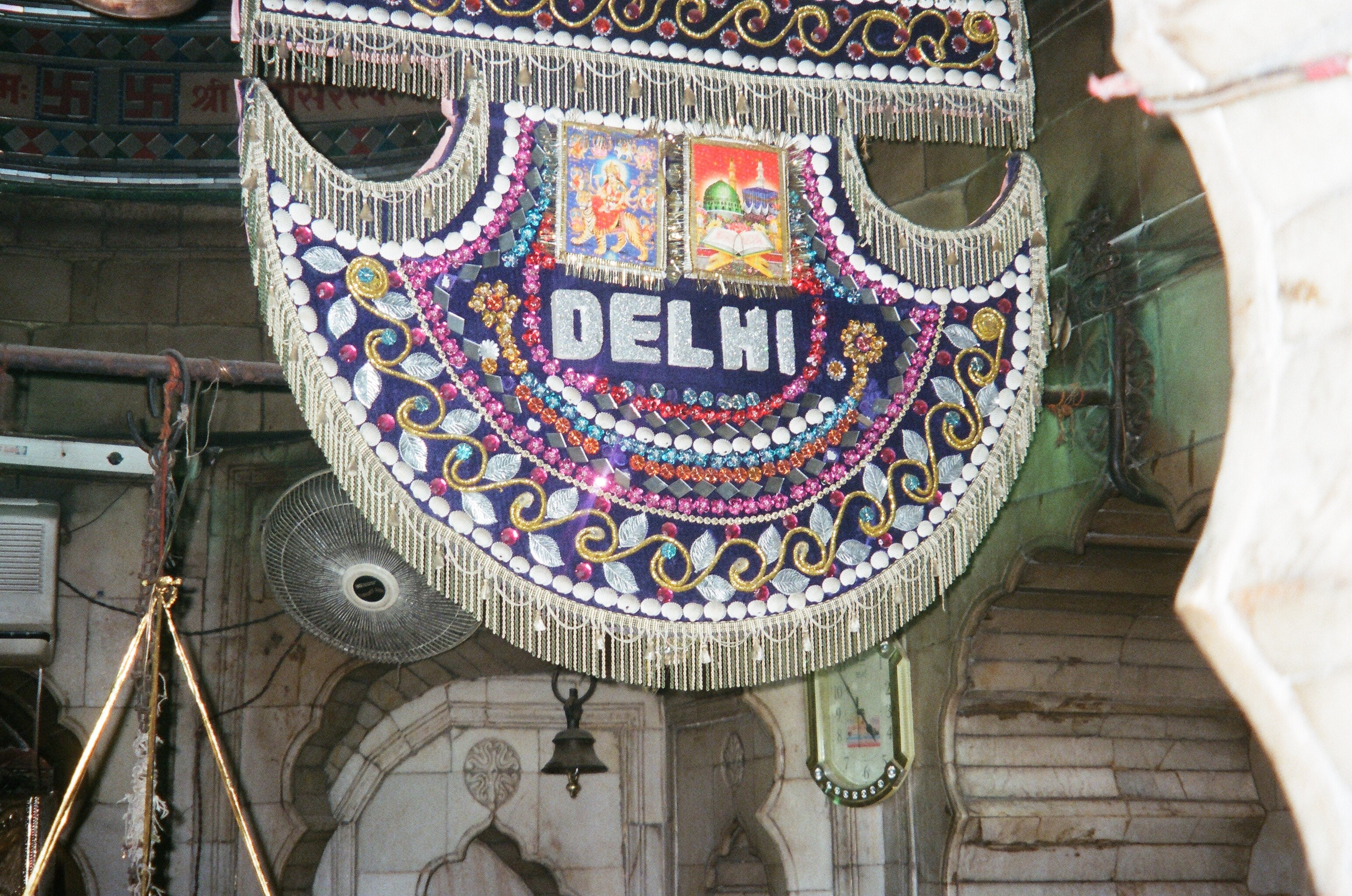
One of two punkah suspended in the sanctum above the idol of Yogmaya: one inscribed Delhi and the other inscribed Haryana, during Phool Walon Ki Sair, a syncretic festival of Hindus and Muslims held in October every year in Mehrauli

The annual Phoolwalon-ki-sair Festival (Festival of flower-sellers), which commences from the dargah of Sufi saint, Qutbuddin Bakhtiar Kaki also in Mehrauli, every autumn (Oct-Nov). First started in 1812, the festival has today, become an important inter-faith festivals of Delhi, and includes offering a floral punkah to the deity at the Yogmaya temple.

== Other Yogmaya temples ==
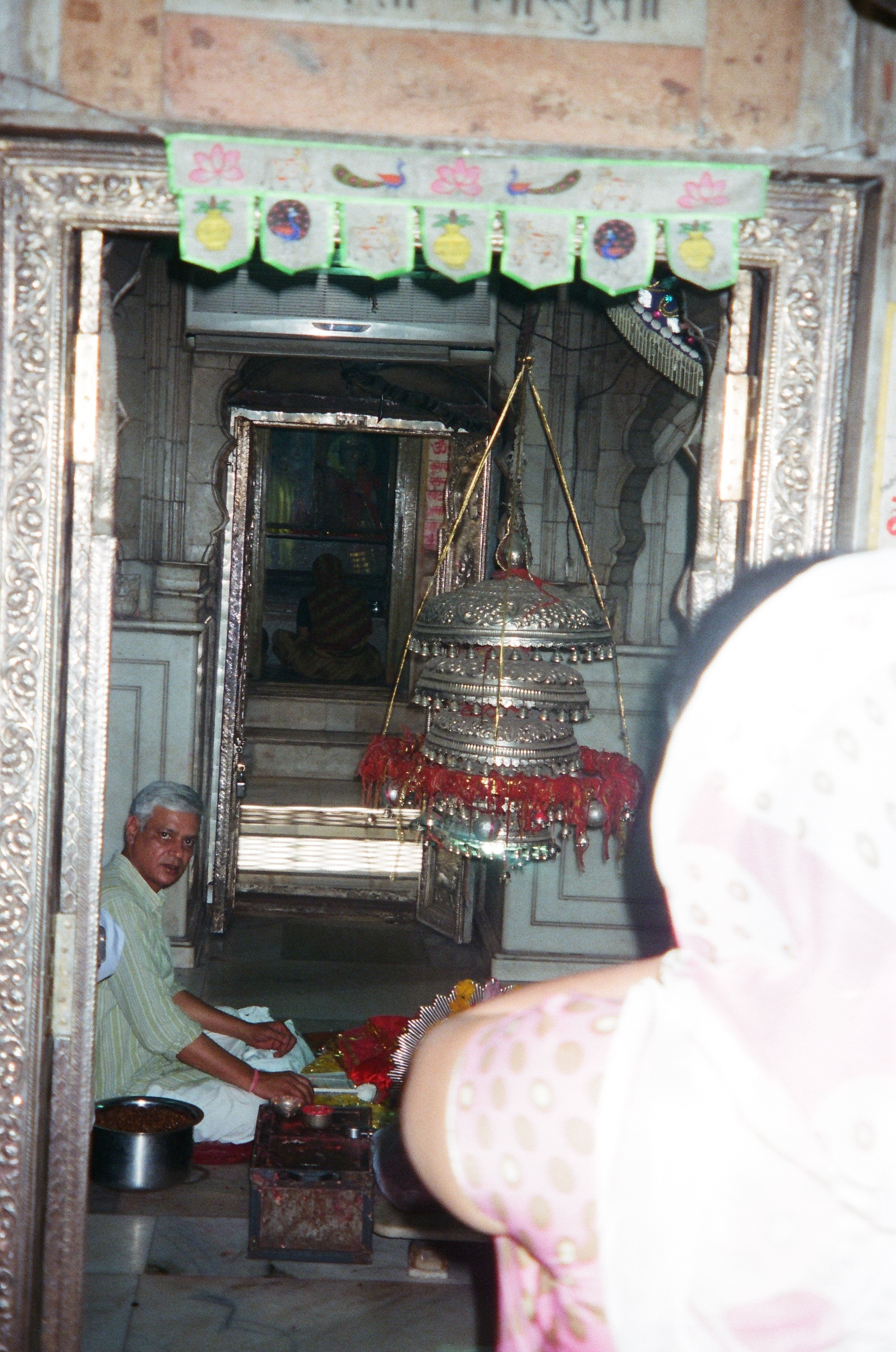
View of the garbhagriha

- Jogmaya Temple, Barmer Rajasthan
- Jogmaya Temple, Multan (now in Pakistan)
- Jogmaya Temple, Jodhpur, Rajasthan
- Yogmaya Temple, Vrindavan
- Yogmaya Temple, Naya Bans Khari Baoli, Old Delhi
- Yogmaya Temple, Dehradun, Uttarakhand
- Jogmaya Tripura Sundari Temple
- Iringole Kavu, Ernakulam, Kerala
