= Naubat Khana (Red Fort) =

Coordinates: 28.655774°N 77.240991°E

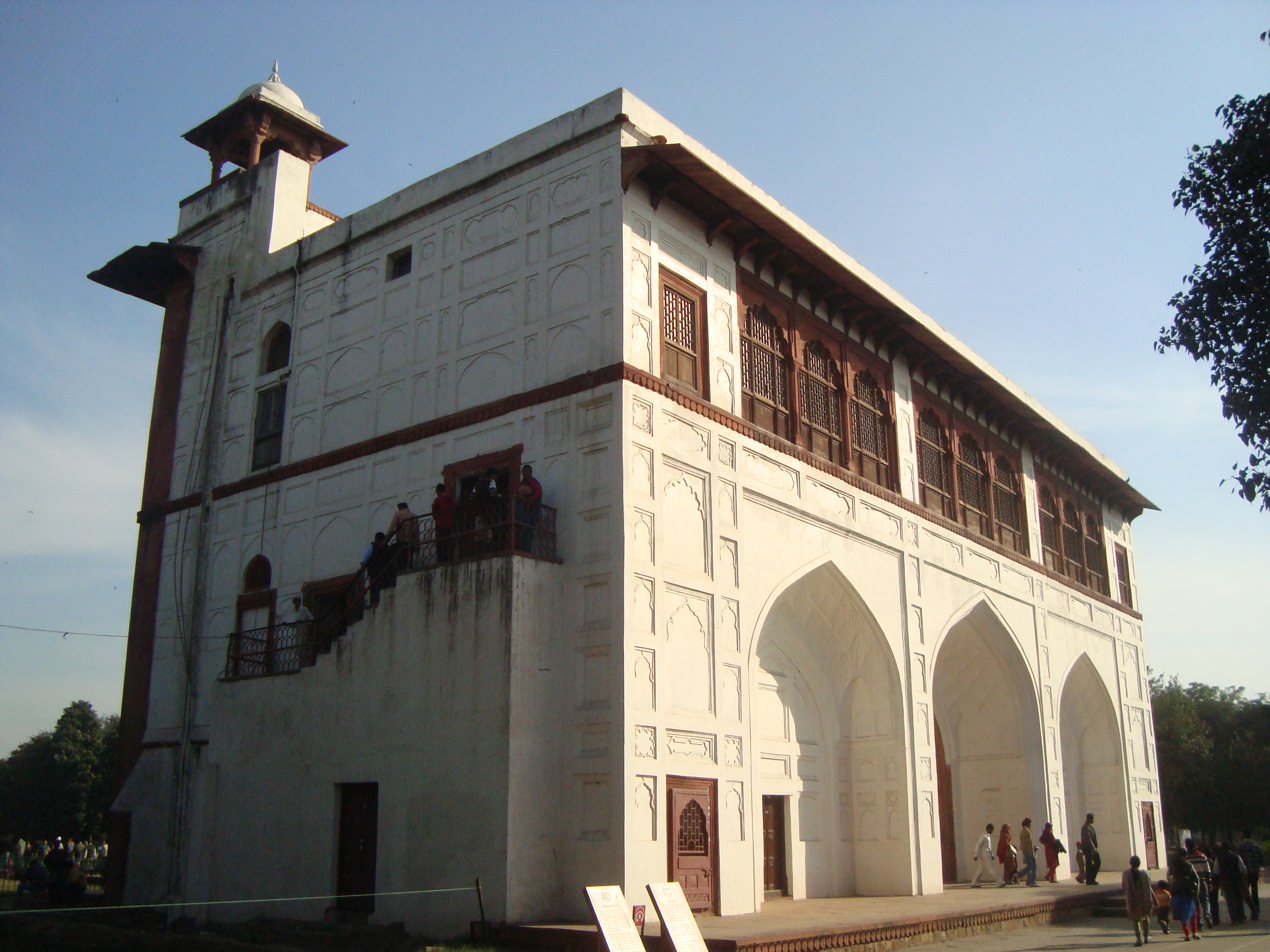
The Naubat Khana in the Red Fort

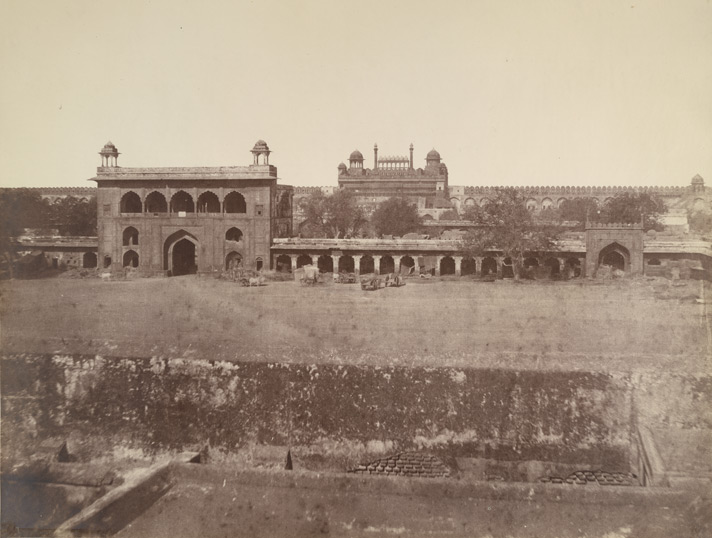
The Naubat Khana and the courtyard, before its destruction in the 1850s by the British colonialists

The Naubat Khana, or Naqqar Khana, is the drum house that stands at the entrance between the outer and inner court at the Red Fort in Old Delhi. It is believed by some historians to be the site of the assassinations of Mughal emperors Jahandar Shah and Farrukhsiyar in the early 18th century. The gate earned its name from the practice of requiring all but royal princes to dismount their elephants here before proceeding into the inner complex. Today, the gate houses the Indian War Memorial Museum, while its architectural grandeurmarked by red sandstone walls, floral carvings, and painted interiors continues to reflect the Mughal architecture.

== History ==
Some historians believe that the later Mughal emperors Jahandar Shah (1712–13) and Farrukhsiyar (1713–19) were assassinated here. The popular name of the gate, Hathiyan pol or "elephant gate," derives from the tradition that everyone except princes of the royal blood had to dismount from their elephants at this point, before entering further into the inner fort complex. The British initially installed the museum of the fort in this gate. It was later moved to the Mumtaz Mahal. The Indian War Memorial Museum is currently located in the first and second stories.

== Architecture ==
The ground plan is a rectangular structure consisting of three large stories. The band gallery is 100 x 80 feet. The construction material is red sandstone, the surface covered in white chunam plaster. The richly carved floral designs on its red sandstone walls appear to have been originally painted with gold. The interior was colourfully painted. Several layers of these paintings can be found at the entrance chamber.

The vaulted arcade of the Chhatta Chowk measures 540 x 360 feet, and ends in the centre of the outer court. The side arcades and central tank were destroyed following the 1857 rebellion. In the east wall of the court lies the Naubat Khana, which was connected to the side arcades. Musicians from the Naubat Khana would announce the arrival of the emperor and other dignitaries at the court of public audience (Diwan-i-Am). Music was also played five times a day at chosen hours. Many Indian royal palaces have a drum house at the entrance.

== See also ==
- The Mumtaz Mahal (Hindustani: ممتاز محل, मुमताज़ महल, literally Jewel Palace) is located in the Red Fort, Delhi.
- The Diwan-i-Am, or Hall of Audience, is a room in the Red Fort of Delhi where the Mughal emperor Akbar (1556 -1605) and his successors received members of the general public and heard their grievances.
- The Rang Mahal or Palace of Colour is located in the Red Fort, Delhi.

== Literature ==
- Koch, Ebba. 1991. Mughal Architecture. Munich: Prestel, 111.
- Mukherji, Anisha Shekhar. 2003. The red fort of Shahjahanabad. Delhi; Oxford: Oxford University Press.
- Tillotson, G.H.R. 1990. Mughal India. San Francisco: Chronicle Books, 57–8.
