= Archibald Seton =

British colonial administrator (1758–1818)

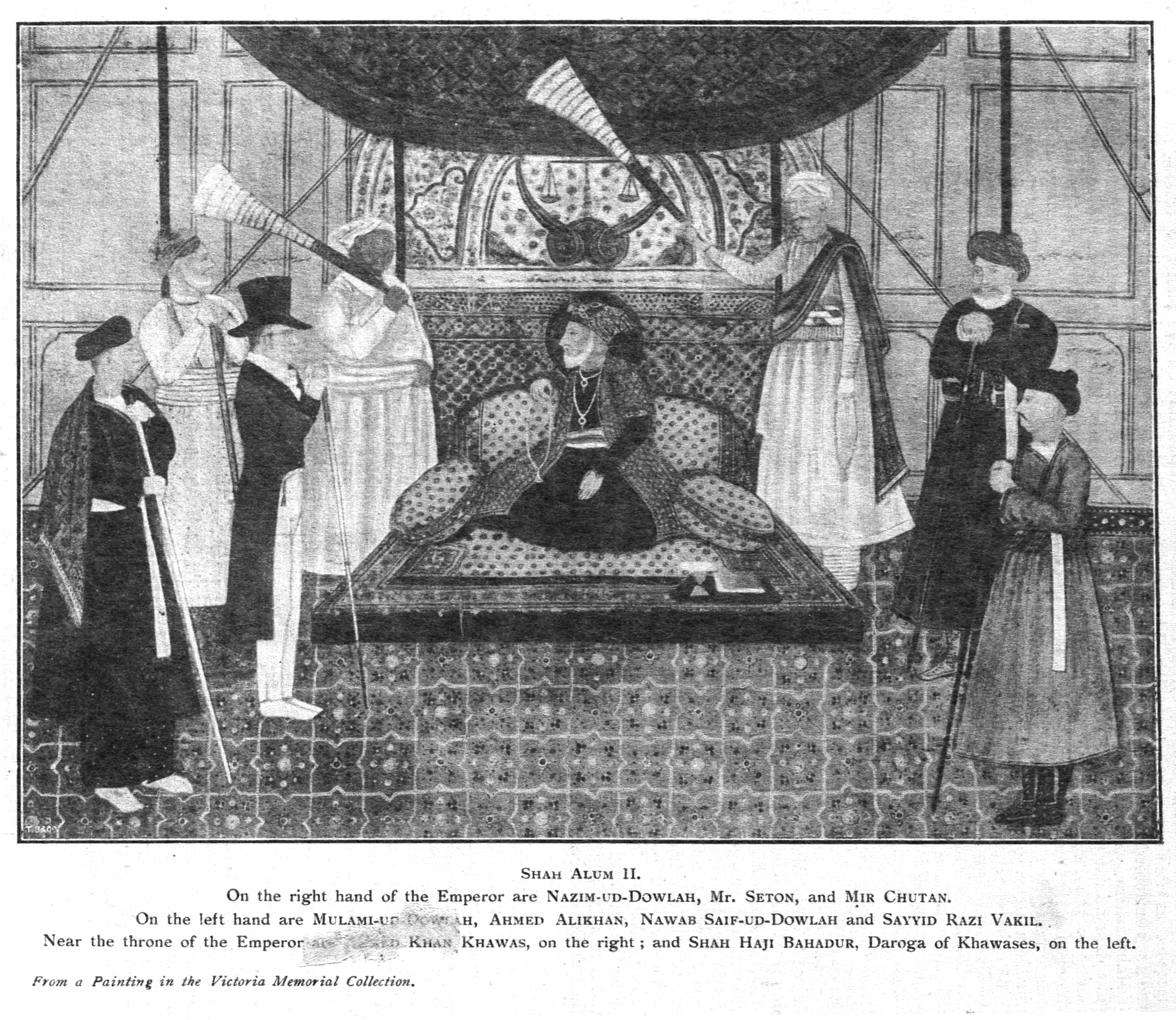
Seton in the court of Shah Alam II

Archibald Seton (1758 – 30 March 1818) was a Scottish East India Company colonial administrator, Resident and Civil servant.

== Bengal Service ==
Seton was the son of Hugh Smith who, on marrying Elizabeth Seton of Touch in 1745, had taken his wife's surname and by doing so inherited her estate. In 1780, Seton went to work for the East India Company's administration in Bengal, India.

After passing through the routine of early service in India with much credit to himself, Mr. Seton was successively entrusted with the charge of the collection of the Revenue, and the administration of Civil and Criminal Justice, in the Districts of Bhangolpore and Behar. He was then promoted to a seat in the Provincial Court of Justice in the Province of Behar; and on the occasion of the cession of a portion of the dominions of the Nabob Vizier to the East India Company, in 1801, be was removed to the same station in the ceded provinces, and was one of the Gentlemen selected by Marquis Wellesley to assist Sir Henry Wellesley in the discharge of the trust of the office of Lieutenant governor of those Provinces.

== Seton, Fitzroy And The Seyud of Bareilly, 1804 ==
During the first few months of Britain's governance at Bareilly in 1804, a magistrate, Fitzroy, in a dispute concerning a garden, struck a Sayud and a cry went up, "A Seyud has been insulted and struck; our houses are about to be demolished..." Archibold Seton, the Governor-General's agent at Bareilly fearing an uprising would overcome the small British occupying force made his way to the Mosque of the popular and respected Moftee Mahomed Ewuz. Seton was first barred entry as he removed his shoes to enter the mosque but was subsequently let go as he said to the guards, "Do you not see, my friends, that I am prepared to approach a sacred place, and meet a holy man."

== The Court At Delhi, 1806–1811 ==
In 1806, Seton was appointed to the office of President at the Court of Shah Alam II, at Delhi, and after Alam's death to that of his successor, Akbar Shah II. During Seton's time in Delhi the East India Company consolidated their rule of parts of the disintegrating Mughal Empire eventually dispensing with the illusion of ruling in the name of the Mughal monarch and removed his name from the Persian texts that appeared on the coins struck by the company in the areas under their control. The East India Company exiled Akbar Shah II's preferred choice of heir, Mirza Jahangir, after he attacked their Seton with a rifle in the Red Fort.

== Governor of the Prince of Wales' Island, 1811 ==
On 9 May 1811, Seton was formally appointed Governor of Prince of Wales's Island (present day Penang). Seton was barely in the colony when he joined the invasion of Java leaving his eventual successor William Petrie as acting Governor.

== Supreme Council, Fort William, Bengal 1812 ==
From Lieutenant-Governor of the Prince of Wales' Island, he was promoted, in 1812, by the Court of Directors of the East India Company, as the reward of his long services, to a seat in the Supreme Council of Bengal, which he filled with much credit for five years, and was on his return to his native country in 1818, at the period of his death.

== Death ==
Archibald Seton died on 30 March 1818 whilst aboard the East India Company ship William Pitt on the passage from St. Helena to England, aged 60.

== Epilogue ==
During the period of Mr. Seton's services, he held the confidence of every government under which he served — that of Marquis Cornwallis, Lord Teignmouth, Marquis Wellesley, Sir George Barlow, the Earl of Minto and the friend by whom this tribute is paid to his memory, and by whom his virtues will ever, be revered, can assert, from an intimate knowledge for a period of nearly forty years, that his desire to promote the happiness of others was uniformly enthusiastic, and that the virtues of his heart were pure, and unmixed with any tincture of alloy.

== See also ==
- The Life of Sir Stamford Raffles By Demetrius Charles Boulger, Demetrius Charles de Kavanagh Boulger Published by H. Marshall, 1897; pp. 97, 223, 239
- The Life of Thomas Coutts, Banker ... By Ernest Hartley Coleridge Published by John Lane Company, 1920; pp. 107, 424, 450
- Minto, 1st Earl, National Library of Scotland
- The life and correspondence of Charles, lord Metcalfe, from unpublished letters and journals

By John William Kaye Published by, 1854; pp. 144, 145, 147, 214, 215

- Empire and Information: Intelligence Gathering and Social Communication in India, 1780–1870

By Christopher Alan Bayly Published by Cambridge University Press, 1996; ISBN 0-521-66360-1, ISBN 978-0-521-66360-1; pp. 132, 165, 291, 410

- Life and Times of Cantoo Baboo (Krisna Kanta Nandy), the Banian of Warren Hastings: Period Covered, 1742-1804 By Somendracandra Nandī Published by Allied, 1978; Item notes: v.2; pp. 291, 292, 369
