= Mirza Nazim Shah =

Shahzada Mirza Nazim Shah Bahadur (c. 1820 – 30 August 1902) also known as Mirza Nazim Shah, was a son of Mughal emperor Akbar II and his consort Gumani Khanum.

After the Indian rebellion of 1857, He was exiled from Delhi to Burma with his elder brother emperor Bahadur Shah II, and died in there.
