= Mirza Jahangir =

- Shahzada of the Mughal Empire
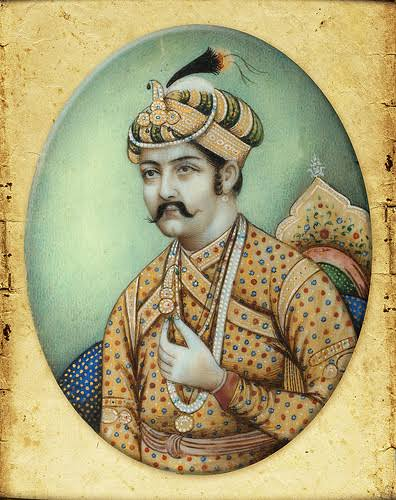
- Born: 1776; Red Fort, Delhi, Mughal Empire
- Died: 18 July 1821 (aged 44–45); Allahabad, British India
- Burial: Nizamuddin Dargah
- Wives: Halima-un-Nissa; Birj Bai; Umrao Bai
- Issue: Sulaiman Jah; Siphr ud-Daula; Zafar Yab Jang; Chughtai Khan Bahadur (1810-1857); Nawab Asa Ra'afat Sultan Begum Sahiba; Nawab Quraisha Sultan Begum Sahiba
Names
- Mirza Muhammad Jahangir Bakht Bahadur
- House: Timurid
- Father: Akbar Shah II
- Mother: Mumtaz Mahal
- Religion: Sunni Islam

Mirza Jahangir (also known as Shahzada Mirza Jahangir Shah Bakht Bahadur) (1776 – 18 July 1821) was the son of Prince Mirza Jahan Shah, who became the Emperor Akbar Shah II in 1806 and his wife Empress Mumtaz Mahal, he was also the younger brother of Emperor Bahadur Shah II and older brother of Mirza Jahan Shah. Under the pressure of his mother, Mumtaz Begum, Akbar Shah declared him as his successor. However, after he attacked the British resident, Archibald Seton, in the Red Fort, the East India Company exiled him and eventually Bahadur Shah II succeed his father in 1837, to become the last Mughal ruler of India . He was subahdar of Assam from 1813 to 1818. He was the 32nd Mughal ruler in Assam.

== Biography ==
Mirza Jahagir's father, the Mughal Emperor Akbar Shah II (r. 1808–1837) was not happy with his eldest son Siraj Uddin “Zafar” (Bahadur Shah Zafar II) and wanted to nominate his younger son Mirza Jahangir as the heir apparent (Wali-Ahad). This move was not liked by Archibald Seton, then British Resident in the Red Fort. One day, when the British Resident at the court went to meet Akbar II, the topic of succession came up again, but the Resident stated the East India Company’s known position very firmly. Angry at this, Mirza Jahangir fired at the British Resident just as he was leaving the Red Fort, but missed.The Resident turned his horse back and asked the prince to apologise, but he refused and taunted him instead, by shouting “Lu, lu hai bey” (cranky booby fie on you). The Resident then went back and returned with a whole posse of British troops, bent on avenging the insult. The prince was arrested and sent in exile to Allahabad in about the year 1812.

His mother pined for him and vowed that if he were to return, she would offer a chadar (canopy) of flowers at the dargah (shrine) of Khwaja Bakhtiar ‘Kaki’ at Mehrauli. After a couple of years, Mirza Jahangir was released, and Mumtaz Mahal Begum went to Mehrauli to redeem her vow. With her, the imperial court also shifted to Mehrauli and so did the entire population of Delhi. For seven days, all sorts of merrymaking continued at Mehrauli with Jhoolas (swings) in the mango groves, cock fighting and bull baiting, kite-flying, wrestling and swimming bouts. Amidst the celebrations, the chadar made of flowers was offered at the shrine. The secular-minded Mughal emperor ordered an offering in the shape of a floral pankha (ceremonial fan) at the Yogmaya Temple.

Seeing the response of the people and sensing the enthusiasm generated, it was decided that the festival would be held annually after the rains, and that people of all communities would make similar offerings at the holy sites. The Darbar was also shifted to Mehrauli for the 7 days of the Festival. The festival reached its pinnacle during the reign of Bahadur Shah Zafar. Bahadur Shah Zafar went to celebrate “Phool Walon Ki Sair” even during the 1857 Siege of Delhi. This was the last “Phool Waalon Ki Sair” under the Mughals.

== Death ==
Mirza Jahangir’s behaviour on his return to Delhi worsened and Akbar II agreed with the British (after he tried to poison his elder brother Bahadur Shah Zafar twice) that he be sent back to Allahabad. There he whiled away his time in drinking Hoffmann’s cherry brandy and making merry with dancing girls. In 1816, Col Sleeman found him in a bad state. “To obtain an interview with the Governor General, Lord Hastings he promised to limit himself to one bottle of port wine daily.” Lord Hastings described him as wearing a tartar dress, a crimson robe, blue vest, lined with fur and a high conical cap ornamented with jewels, though it was the peak of summer. He had long hair, cut at the side — a handsome young man gone astray. The prince died in 1821, long before his parents, and was buried in tomb in Delhi near the Nizamuddin Dargah.
