= Death of Nadhem Abdullah =

Iraqi man

Nadhem Abdullah (died May 2003) was an Iraqi man who died after an alleged encounter with soldiers from the British Army's 3rd Battalion, Parachute Regiment (3 PARA). The regiment had participated in the 2003 invasion of Iraq as part of the Multi-National Force – Iraq. In May 2003, a British patrol consisting of soldiers from 3 PARA entered the village of Uzayra in southern Iraq where a violent encounter allegedly ensued between the patrol and local villagers, which resulted in Abdullah's death. After the incident, seven soldiers from the patrol were court-martialed in Colchester, Essex in 2005, three of whom had already left the Army.

QC Martin Heslop, who was responsible for prosecuting the defendants, claimed that they "brutally assaulted a number of unarmed Iraqi civilians, causing serious injuries from which one died", and "the paratroopers had been in pursuit of a white pick-up truck when they passed a white Toyota containing Mr Abdullah and Athar Saddam" and boxed in the vehicle before "dragging the deceased and the driver out and attacking them". Heslop also claimed that the soldiers had faced no hostility from Abdullah and the incident was "nothing more than gratuitous violence meted out on a number of innocent and unarmed Iraqi civilians". The defendants denied the charges, and in response to public queries, the British Ministry of Defence (MoD) said it could not give out the defendants' addresses for security reasons.

The court-martial lasted until 3 November 2005, when the president judge in the trial, Jeff Blackett, directed the panel which heard the court martial to return not guilty verdicts on the defendants after criticising the "inadequate" investigation into the case. Blackett noted that though the prosecutors had presented their case "properly and objectively", "it has become clear to everyone involved as the trial has progressed that the main Iraqi witnesses had colluded to exaggerate and lie about the incident." He further stated that three Iraqi witnesses had admitted to making false claims of being assaulted by British soldiers and one Iraqi witness testified that Abdullah's family "encouraged others to tell lies", adding that witnesses who were some distance from the scene "could not possibly have seen what they said they saw" and used the case to seek "compensation to what were patently exaggerated claims". The court heard that Iraqi witnesses were paid $100 per day to give evidence at the trial and that some only agreed to give evidence after being told they would be paid.

MoD spokesmen, in response to the not guilty verdict, said that Blackett "made clear that on the basis of the evidence provided very serious allegations had been made and that it was perfectly proper to take the matter to trial", adding that soldiers were not above the law and it was right that the allegations had been "followed up and the evidence tested in full". Solicitors for the defendants argued that there had not been strong enough evidence to take the case to trial, with one solicitor, Roger Brice, telling the BBC that "What the judge has done today is stop the case when the prosecution have concluded... there was never a case for any of the defendants to answer. He summed up the fact that the evidence as it came out in these last two months has been one of acknowledged lies." BBC correspondent Paul Adams said there was an "underlying sense" that some of the witnesses were "out to try and get something for themselves", and added that "[a] number of questions were going to be asked about why the trial had been mounted".
