= Akbar II =

Mughal emperor from 1806 to 1837

Akbar II اکبر دوم
- King of Delhi; Badshah
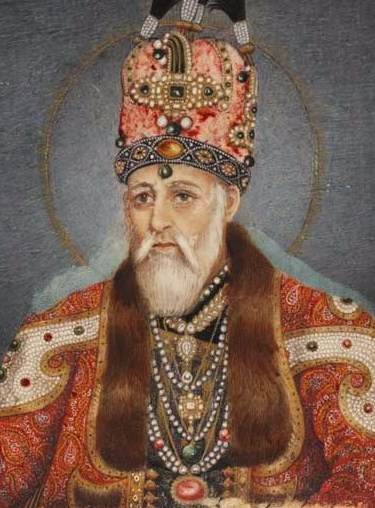
- Portrait of Akbar Shah II, c. 1827

Mughal emperor
- Reign: 19 November 1806 – 28 September 1837
- Coronation: 19 November 1806
- Predecessor: Shah Alam II
- Successor: Bahadur Shah II
- Born: Mirza Akbar; 22 April 1760; Mukundpur, Rewa State, Maratha Confederacy
- Died: 28 September 1837 (aged 77); Delhi, Subah of Delhi, Mughal Empire
- Burial: Moti Masjid, Delhi, India
- Spouse: Mumtaz Mahal; Anwar Mahal; Lal Bai
- Issue: 14 sons, including: Mirza Firuz Bakht; Bahadur Shah II; Mirza Buland Bakht; Mirza Jahangir; Mirza Jahan Shah; Mirza Taimoor Shah; Mirza Kayqubad; Mirza Kaykaus; Mirza Nali; Mirza Babur; Mirza Salim; Mirza Nazim Shah; Mirza Jahan Khushru; Mirza Shujaat Shah; 8 daughters
Names
- Sultan Ibn Sultan Sahib al-Mufazi Wali Ni'mat Haqiqi Khudavand Mujazi Abu Nasir Mu'in al-Din Muhammad Akbar Shah Pad-Shah Ghazi
Era dates
- 18th and 19th centuries
Regnal name
- Akbar Shah II
- House: Mughal dynasty
- Dynasty: Timurid dynasty
- Father: Shah Alam II
- Mother: Qudsia Begum
- Religion: Sunni Islam (Hanafi)
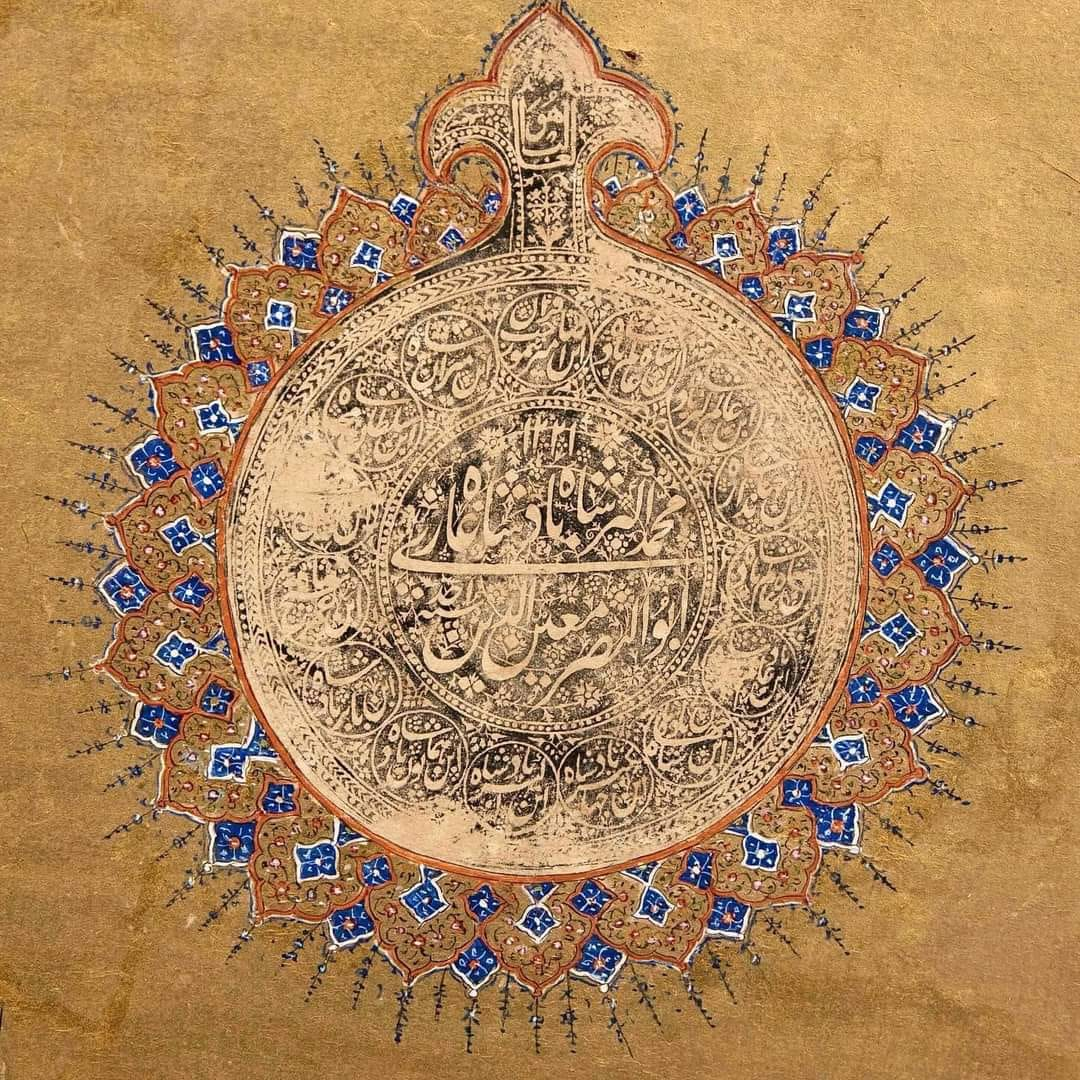
- Seal

Akbar II (Persian: اکبر دوم, Persian pronunciation: [ak.baɾ]; 22 April 1760 – 28 September 1837), also known as Akbar Shah II (Persian: اکبر شاه دوم), was the nineteenth Mughal emperor from 1806 to 1837. He was the second son of Shah Alam II and the father of Bahadur Shah II, who would eventually succeed him and become the last Mughal emperor.

Akbar had little de facto power due to the increasing British influence in India through the East India Company. He sent Ram Mohan Roy as an ambassador to Britain and gave him the title of Raja. During his regime, in 1835, the East India Company discontinued calling itself subject of the Mughal Emperor and issuing coins in his name. The Persian lines in the company's coins to this effect were deleted.

Akbar II was credited with starting the Hindu–Muslim unity festival Phool Walon Ki Sair. His grave lies next to the dargah of 13th-century Sufi saint Qutbuddin Bakhtiar Kaki at Mehrauli.

== Early life ==
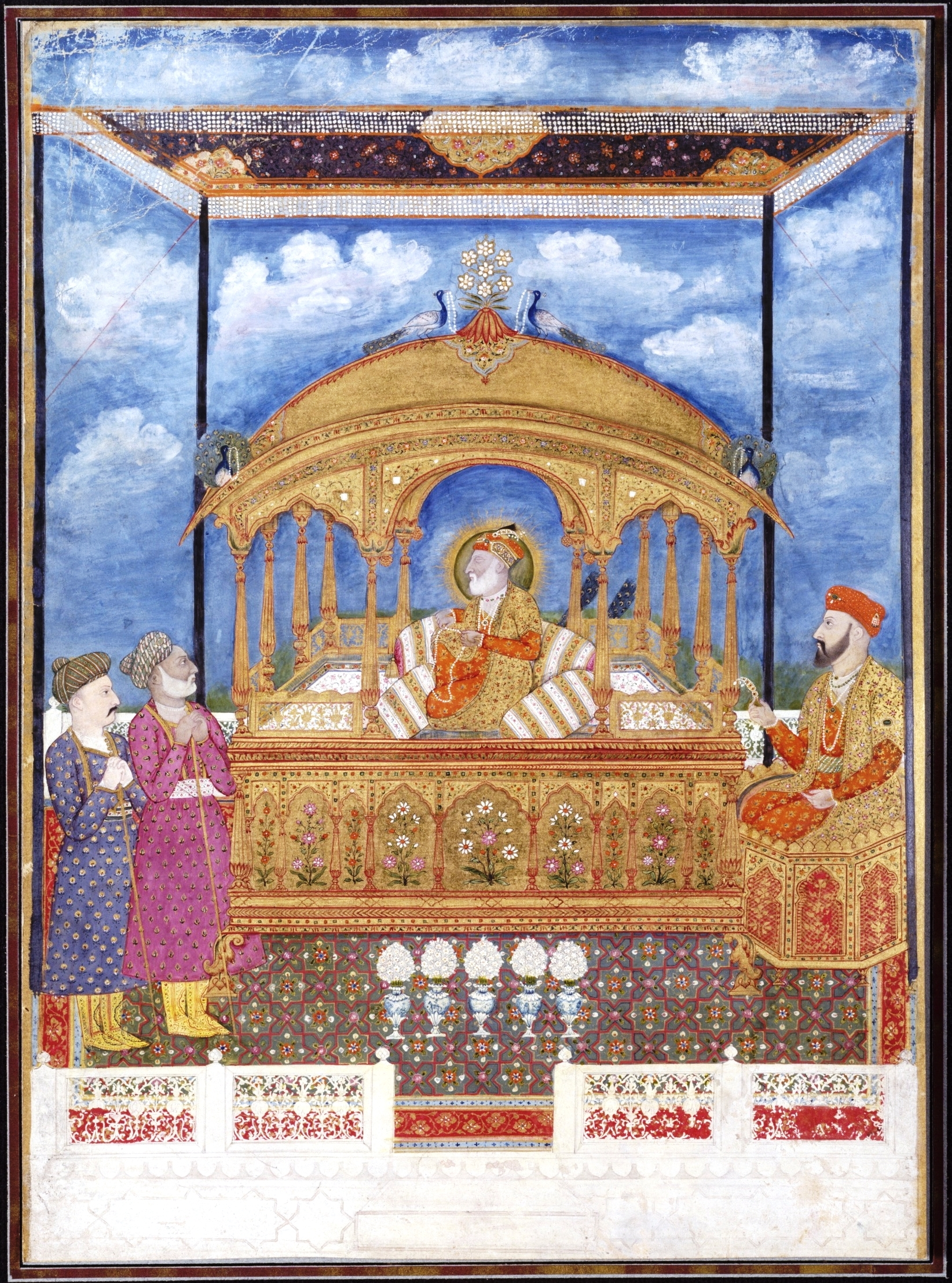
The crown prince seated next to his blinded father Shah Alam II (c. 1800)

Prince Mirza Akbar was born on 22 April 1760 to Emperor Shah Alam II at Mukundpur, Satna, while his father was in exile. On 2 May 1781, at the Red Fort, the prince was made Crown prince with the title of Wali Ahd Bahadur, after the death of his elder brother. In 1782, he was appointed the viceroy of Delhi until 1799. When the Rohilla leader Ghulam Qadir captured Delhi in 1788, the young Prince Mirza Akbar was forced to nautch dance along with other Mughal princes. He witnessed how the members of the imperial Mughal family were humiliated, as well as starved. When Shah Jahan IV fled, Mirza Akbar was titular Emperor with the title of Akbar Shah II, and was to remain acting emperor even after the reinstatement of his father Shah Alam II, till January 1789.

== Reign ==
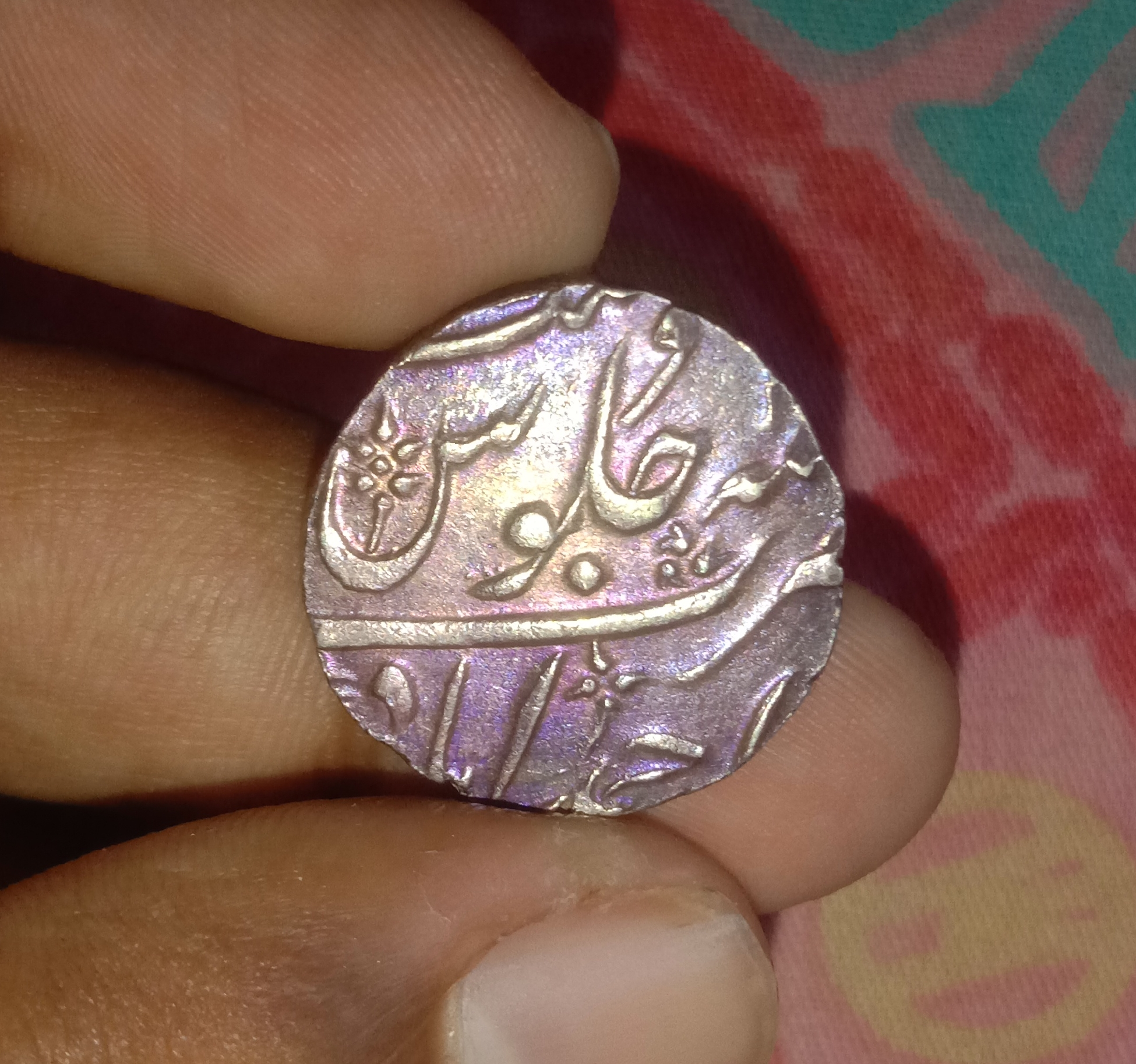
Silver Rupee from the Bombay Presidency, struck in Ahmedabad, in the name of Mughal emperor Akbar II.

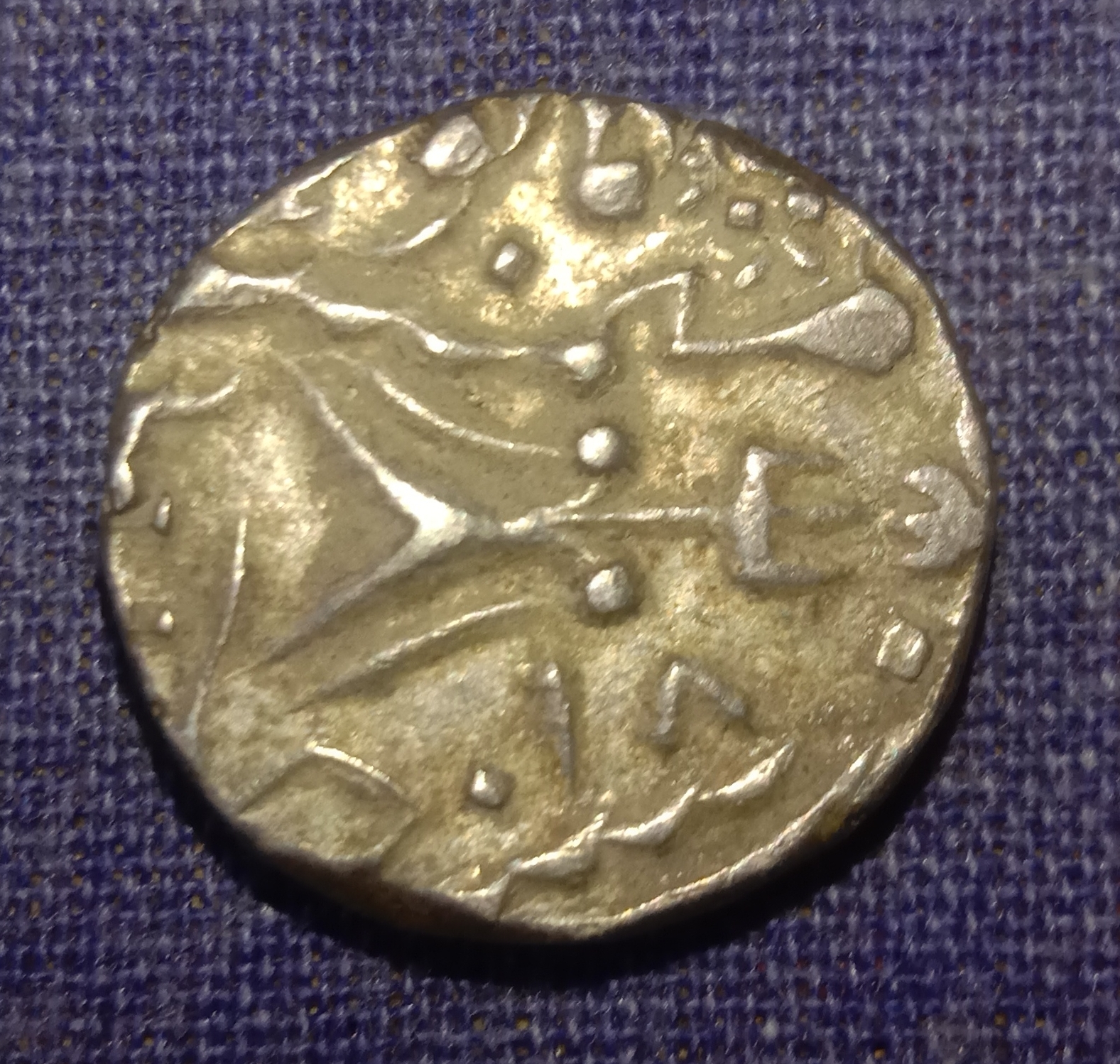
Silver Rupee of the Bhopal State, struck in the name of Mughal emperor Akbar II, minted in Daulatgarh, having the trident symbol in horizontal position.

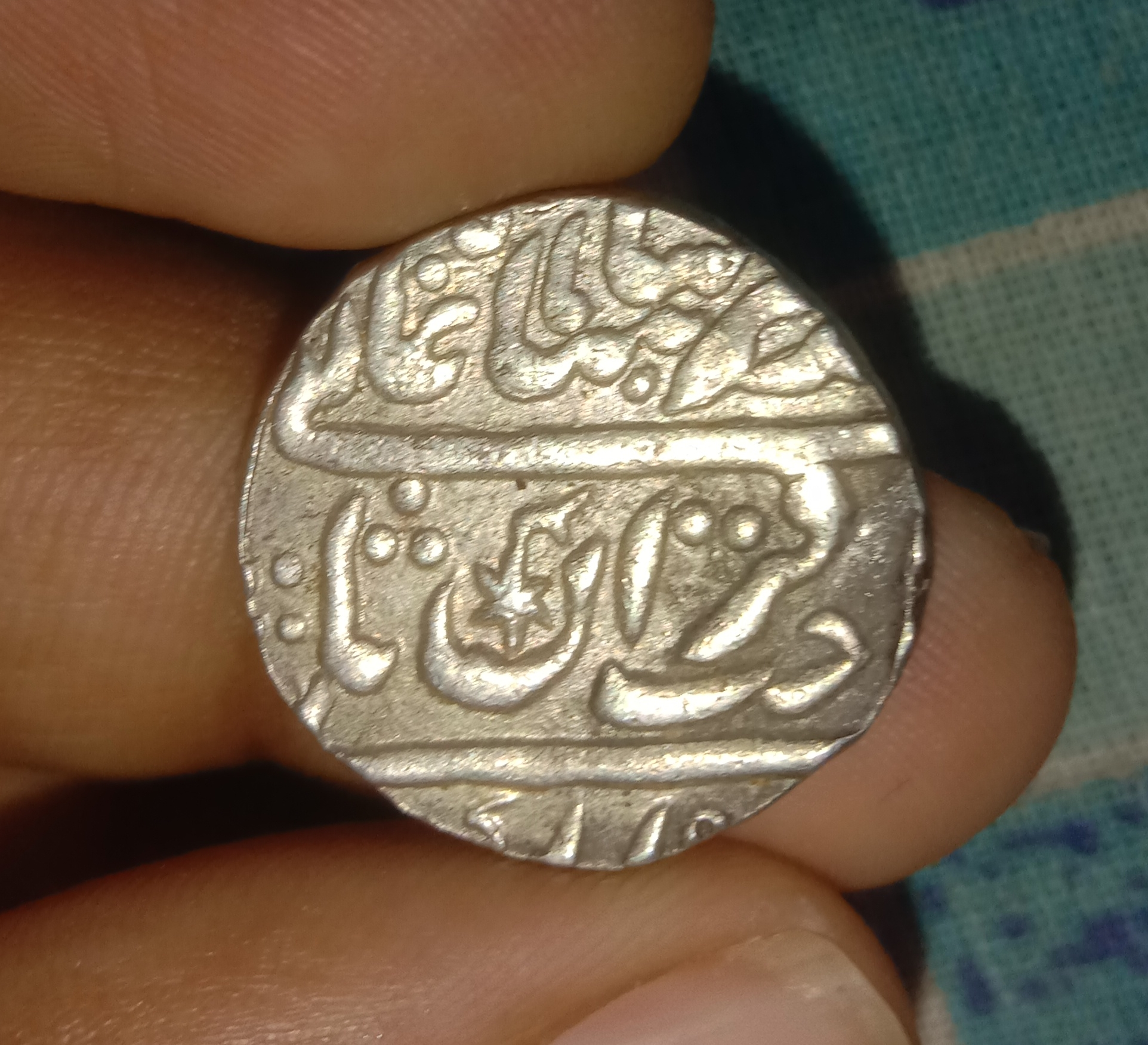
Silver Rupee of Bharatpur State, struck in the name of Mughal emperor Akbar II, Mahe Indrapur Mint.

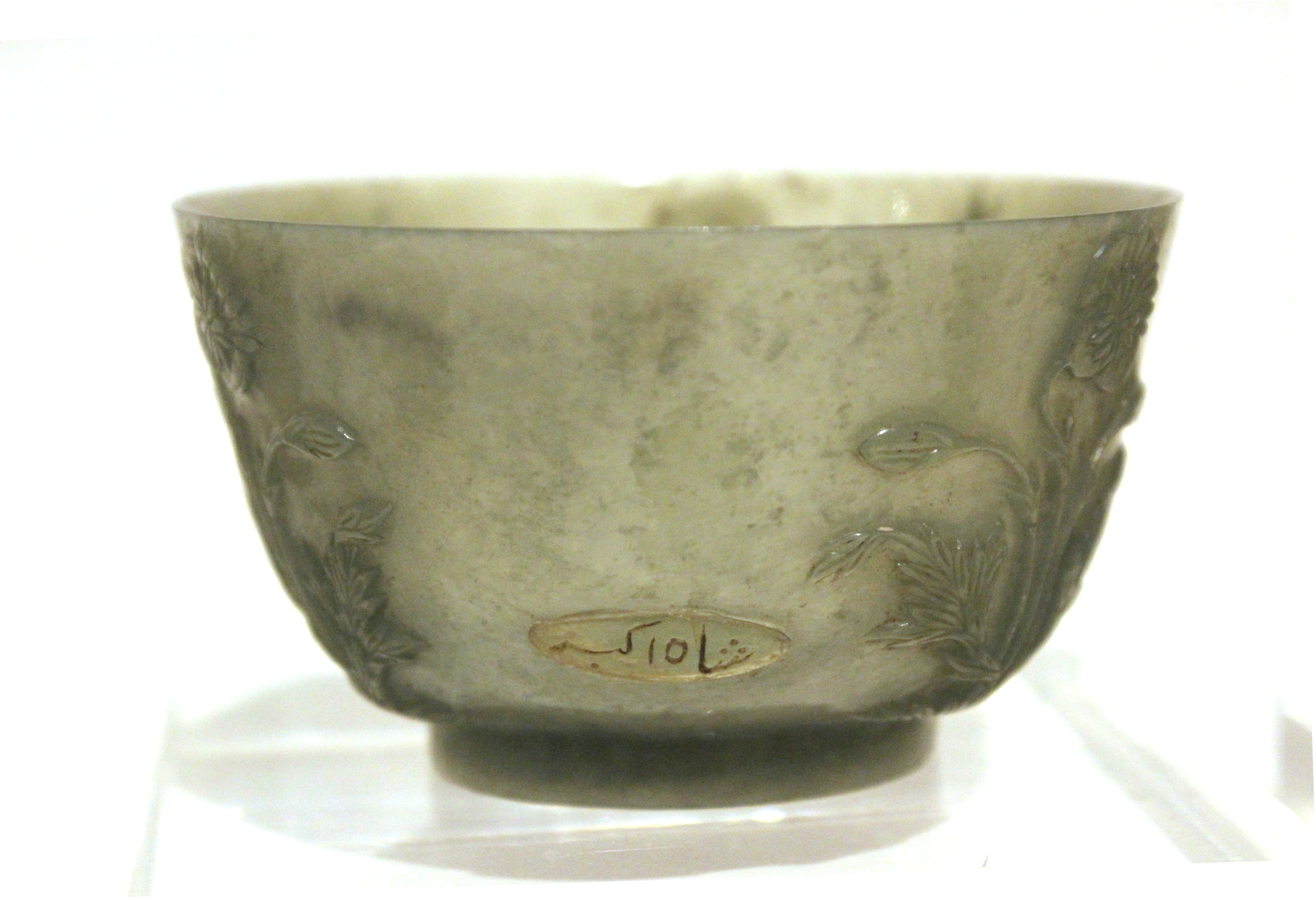
Jade bowl inscribed with the name of the emperor

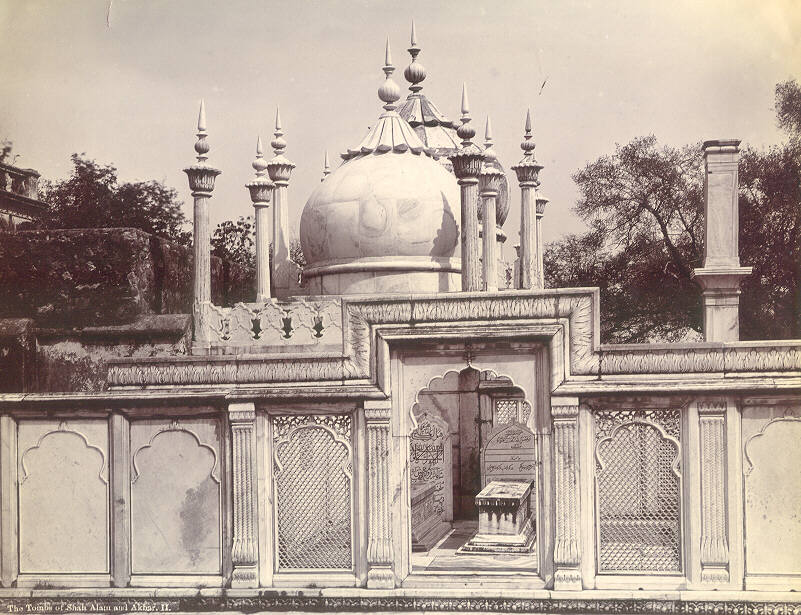
The tombs of Akbar II and his father Shah Alam II in Zafar Mehal, Mehrauli, Delhi

Emperor Akbar II presided over an empire titularly large but in effect limited to the Red Fort in Delhi alone. The cultural life of Delhi as a whole flourished during his reign. However, his attitude towards East India Company officials, especially Lord Hastings, to whom he refused to grant an audience on terms other than those of subject and sovereign, although honourable to him, increasingly frustrated the British, who regarded him as merely their pensioner. The British therefore reduced his titular authority to 'King of Delhi' in 1835 and the East India Company ceased to act as the mere lieutenants of the Mughal Empire as they did from 1803 to 1835. Simultaneously they replaced Persian text with English text on the company's coins, which no longer carried the emperor's name.

The British encouraged the Nawab of Oudh and the Nizam of Hyderabad to take royal titles to further diminish the Emperor's status and influence. Out of deference, the Nizam did not, but the Nawab of Awadh did so.

He is also known to have bestowed the title Nawab upon the Nawab of Tonk and Nawab of Jaora.

Akbar II appointed the Bengali reformer Ram Mohan Roy, to appeal against his treatment by the East India Company, conferring on him the title of Raja. Ram Mohan Roy then visited England, as the Mughal envoy to the Court of St James’s. Ram Mohan Roy submitted a well-argued memorial on behalf of the Mughal ruler, but to no avail.

The grave of Akbar II lies within a marble enclosure adjoined to the Moti Masjid near the dargah of the 13th century Sufi saint, Qutbuddin Bakhtiar Kaki at Mehrauli, Delhi. The Mughal emperors Bahadur Shah I, (Shah Alam I) and Shah Alam II are also buried here.

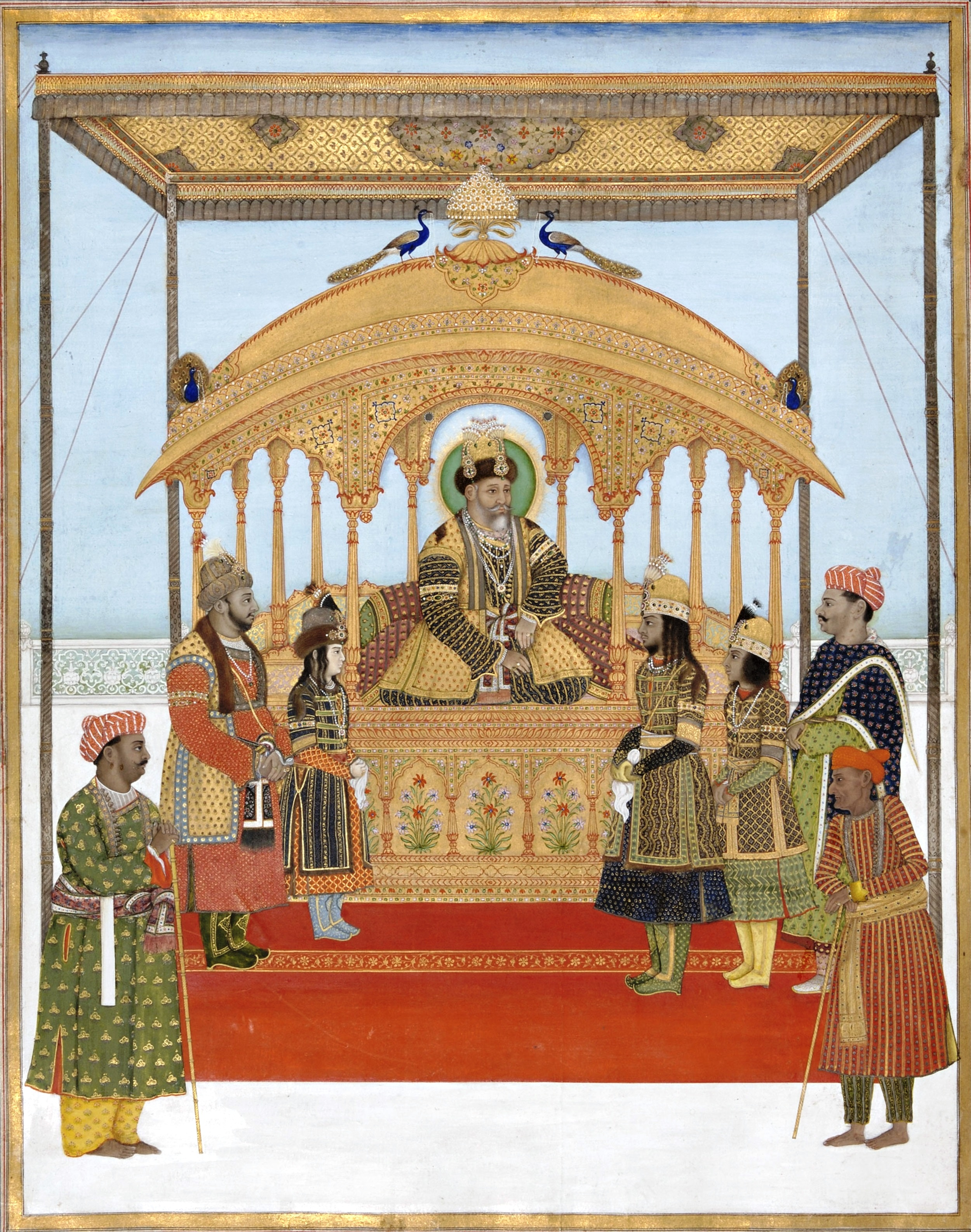
Akbar II holding audience on the Peacock Throne.

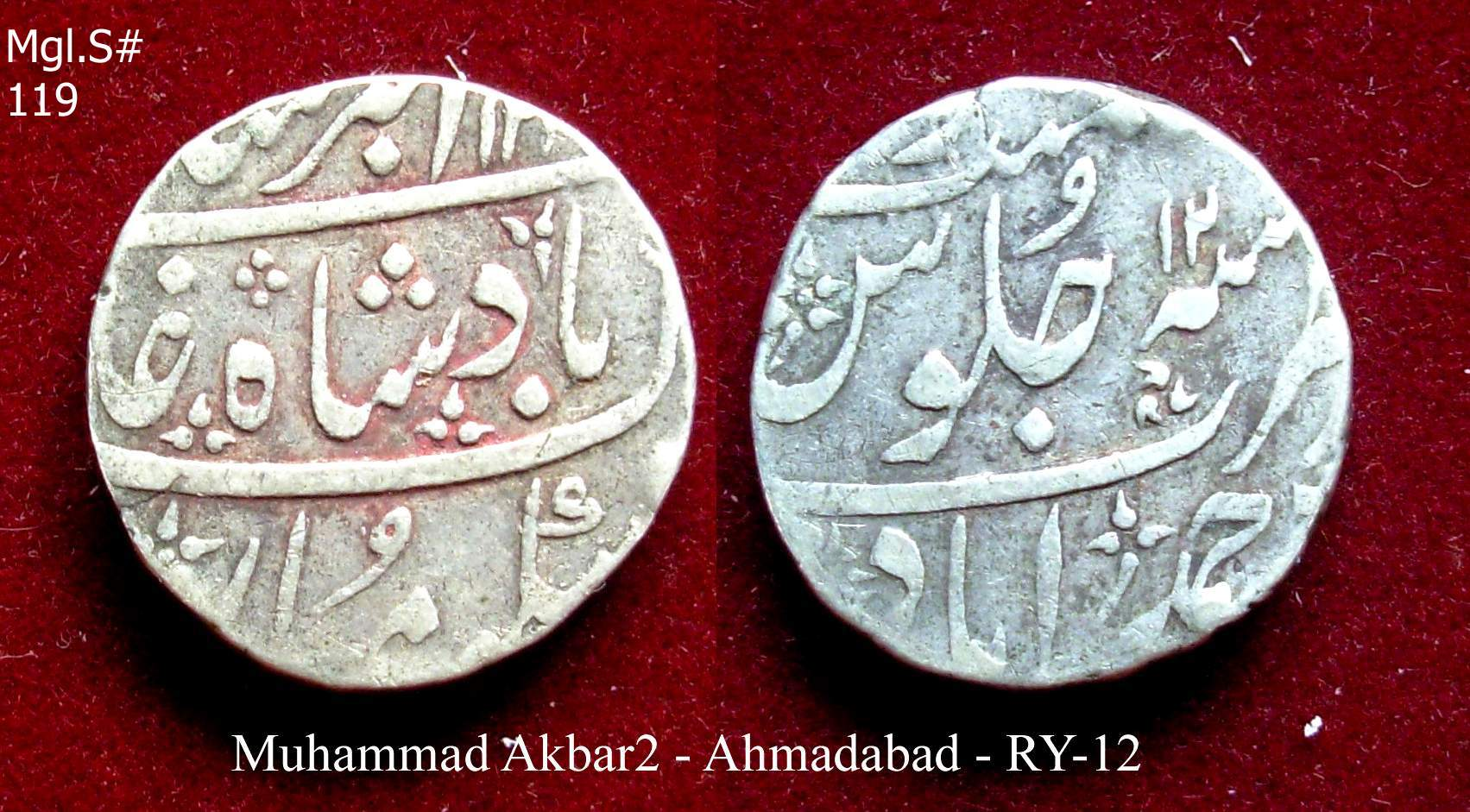
Silver Rupee coin of Akbar II.

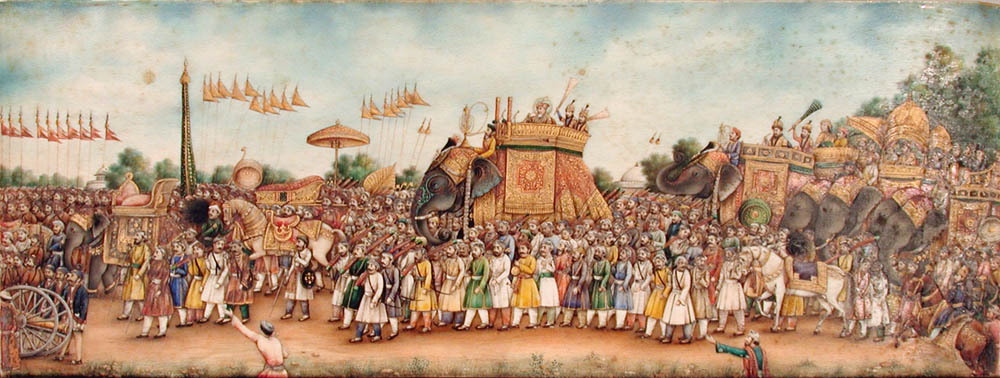
Akbar Shah II rides an elephant in a huge procession 1835

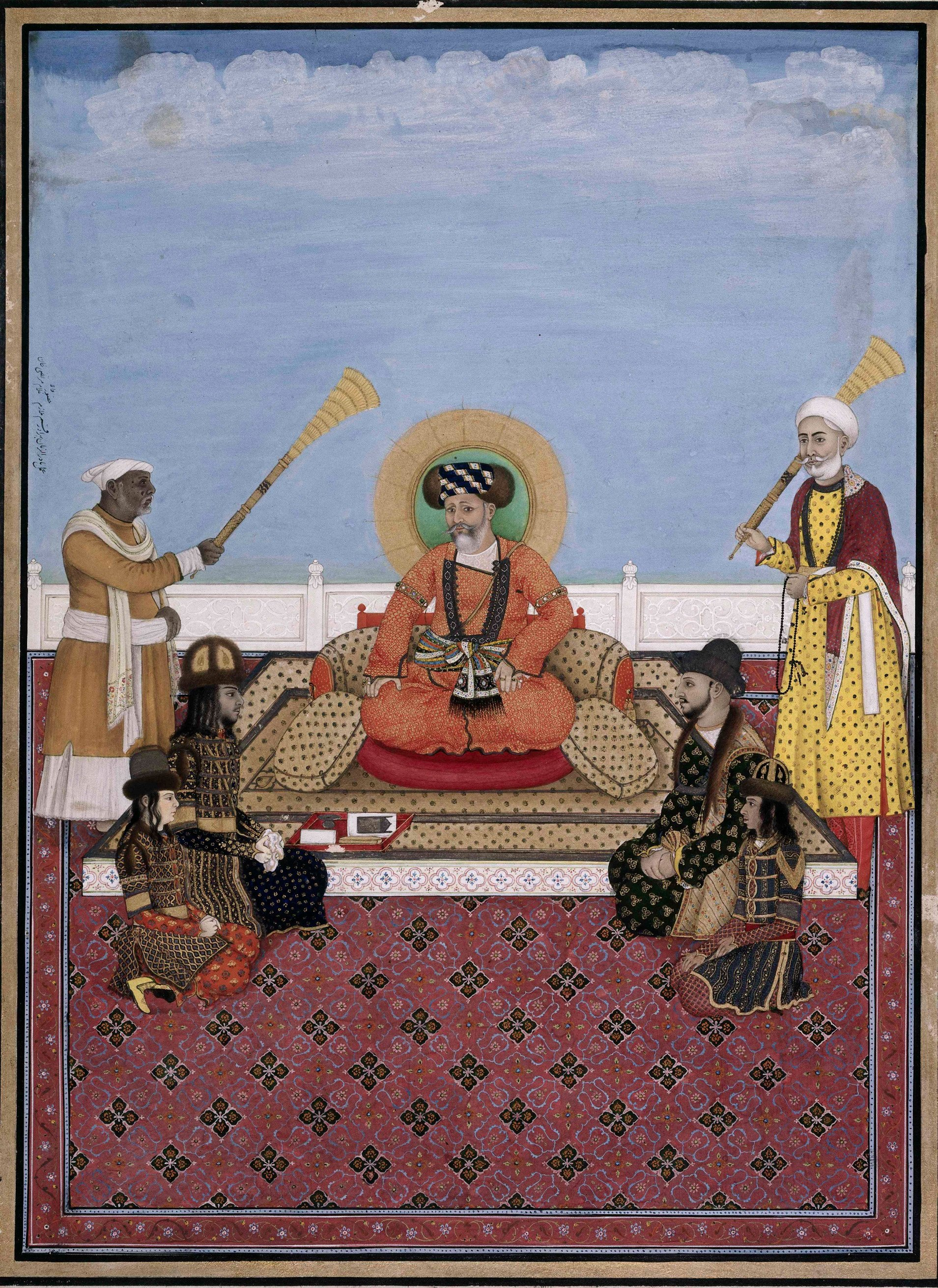
Akbar Shah II and his four sons

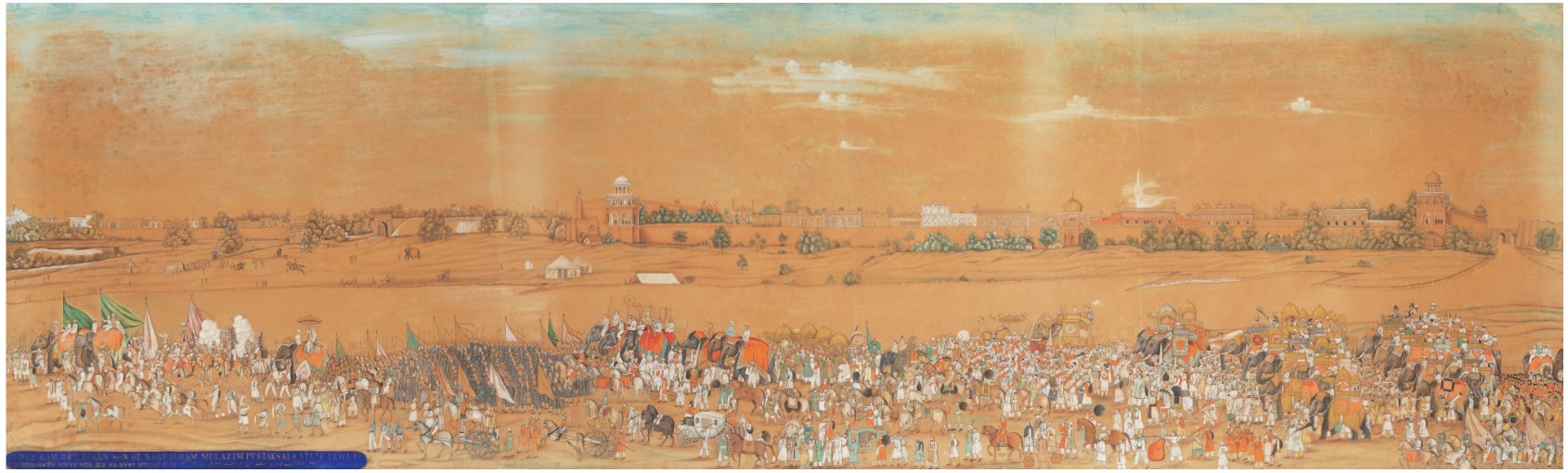
Durbar Procession of Mughal Emperor Akbar II, with British Resident Charles Metcalfe, by Udey Ram

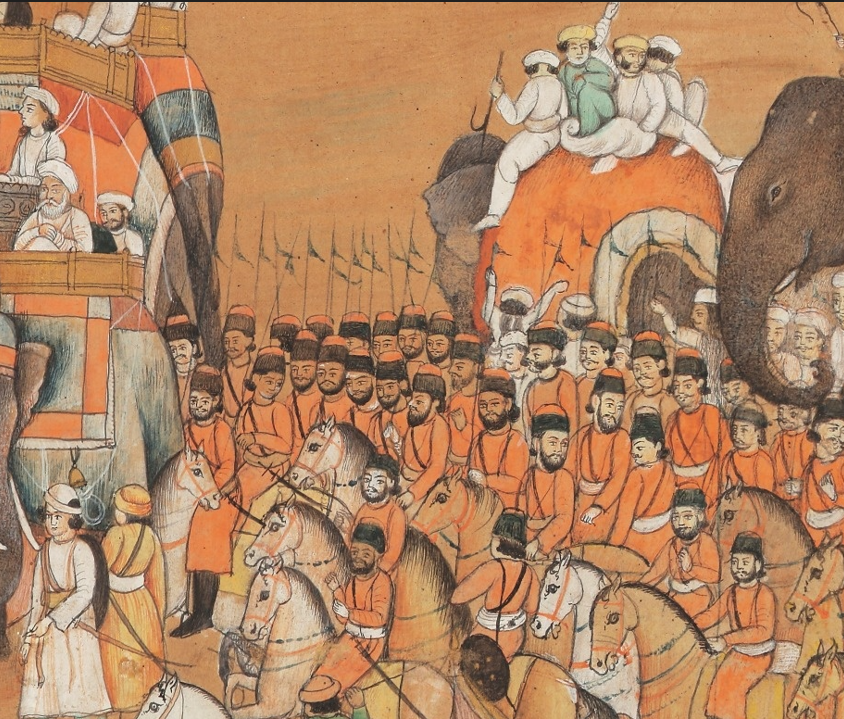
Cavalry in Durbar Procession of Mughal Emperor Akbar II

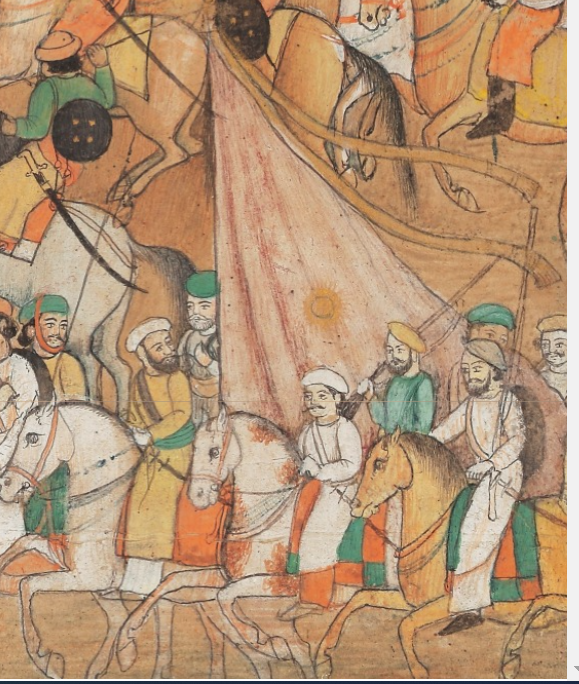
Mounted standard-bearers in the procession of Akbar II

== Descendants ==
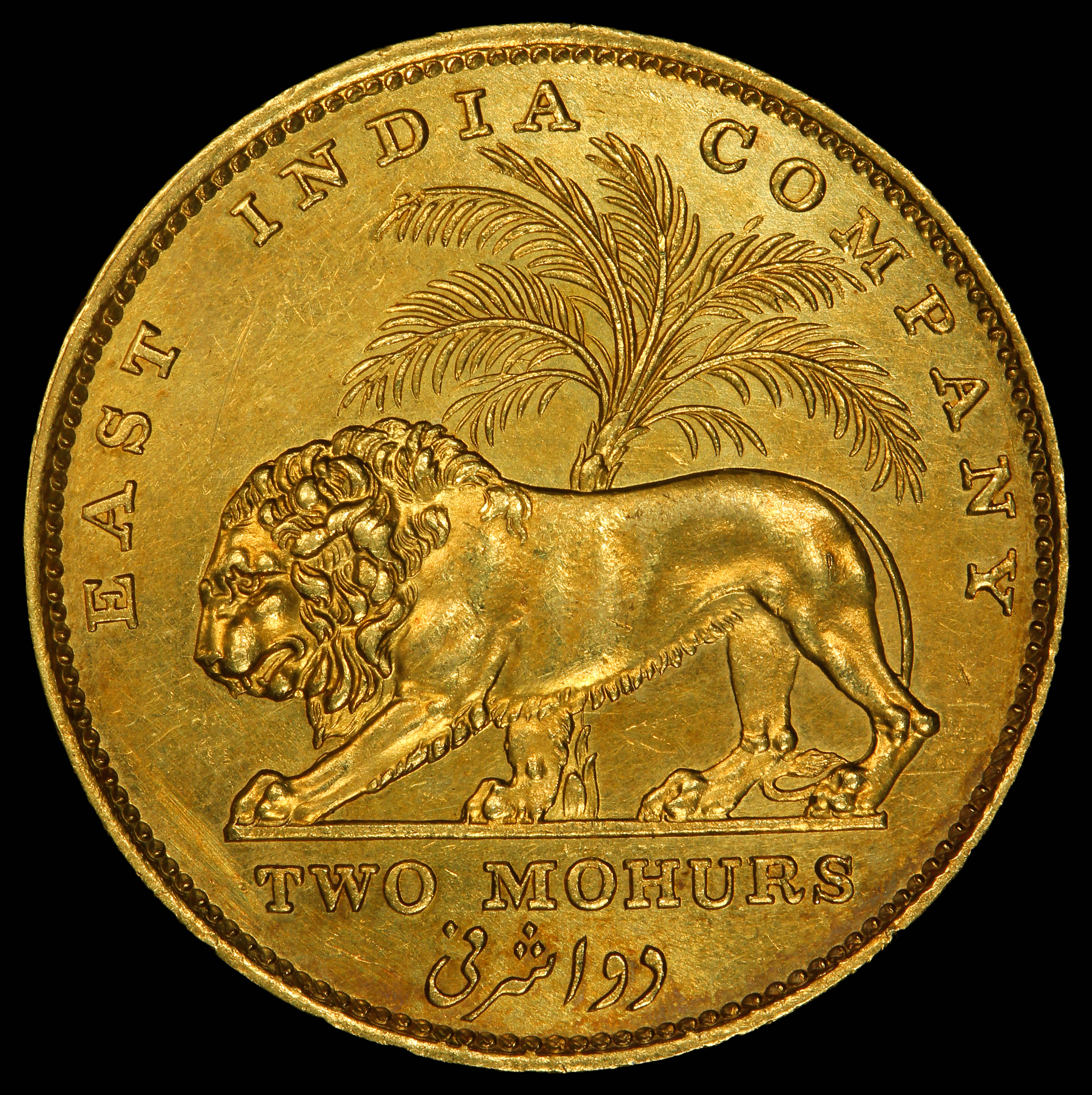
An East India Company Double Mohur, struck in 1835, featuring Ali the lion (Sher-e-Ali) and the sacred tree of Karbala

After the mutiny, cousins of Mirza Mughal, son of Bahadur Shah Zafar, son of Akbar II, escaped to neighbouring areas in fear of capture by the British. Prince Mirza Mughal, the heir apparent was himself captured and executed by the British near Delhi gate. Many surviving princes settled in various provinces of India, but some settled in Burma, Bengal and Deccan since a large number of imperial family members, along with Emperor Bahadur Shah II were exiled to Rangoon in Burma.

== See also ==
- Akbar I
- Mirza Nali
- Jalaluddin Mirza
- Mirza Zafar

== Bibliography ==
- Whitehead, Richard Bertram (1929). "Akbar II as Pretender: A Study in Anarchy". Journal of the Royal Asiatic Society of Great Britain and Ireland. 61 (2): 259–272. doi:10.1017/S0035869X00082149. ISSN 0035-869X. JSTOR 25193883. S2CID 163201364.

Media related to Akbar II at Wikimedia Commons
