= List of Monuments of National Importance in Delhi =

This is a list of Monuments of National Importance (ASI) as officially recognized by and available through the website of the Archaeological Survey of India in the Indian union territory Delhi. The monument identifier is a combination of the abbreviation of the subdivision of the list (state, ASI circle) and the numbering as published on the website of the ASI. 174 Monuments of National Importance have been recognized by the ASI in Delhi.

"Inventory of monuments and sites of national importance vol.1; pt.3 (Delhi circle)" was published by Archaeological Survey of India in 2004, with details about 154 monuments.

Ministry of Culture has on 12 FEB 2026 delisted 3 monuments from this list.

== List of monuments of national importance ==
| SL. No. | Description | Location | Address | District | Coordinates | Image |
|---|---|---|---|---|---|---|
| N-DL-1 | Bastion, where a wall of Jahanpanah meets the wall of Rai Pithora fort. | Adchini | | Delhi | 28°31′39″N 77°12′09″E | Bastion, where a wall of Jahanpanah meets the wall of Rai Pithora fort. More images |
| N-DL-2 | Ramp and gateway of Rai Pithora's Fort | Adchini | | Delhi | 28°31′13″N 77°11′59″E | Ramp and gateway of Rai Pithora's Fort More images |
| N-DL-3 | Marble Tomb reputed to be that of Newab Bahadur Jawid Khan | Aliganj | | Delhi | 28°34′51″N 77°12′58″E | Upload Photo |
| N-DL-4 | Lal Bangla, c. 1780 | Babarpur (Kaka Nagar) | at the entrance of Delhi Golf Club | Delhi | 28°36′01″N 77°14′17″E | Lal Bangla, c. 1780 More images |
| N-DL-5 | Khair-ul-Manzil (also: Khairul Manazil or Khair-ul-Manajil). Built 1561 A.D. | Babarpur Bazipur (Kakanagar), opposite Purana Qila, Delhi | Near Old Fort, Mathura Road | Delhi | 28°36′27″N 77°14′22″E | Khair-ul-Manzil (also: Khairul Manazil or Khair-ul-Manajil). Built 1561 A.D. More images |
| N-DL-6 | Kos Minar or Mughal Mile stone | Babarpur Bazipur( Kakanagar) | Delhi Zoo, Indrapat | Delhi | 28°36′09″N 77°14′44″E | Kos Minar or Mughal Mile stone More images |
| N-DL-7 | The Moti Gate of Sher Shah Suri, Delhi. Currently missing | Babarpur Bazipur (Kakanagar) | | Delhi | | Upload Photo |
| N-DL-8 | Begampuri Masjid | Begampur, in historic Jahanpanah | | Delhi | 28°31′16″N 77°14′46″E | Begampuri Masjid More images |
| N-DL-9 | Phool Chadar aqueduct near Najafgarh jhil aqueduct. Demolished in the 1970's. | Chaukri Mubarakabad | | Delhi | | Upload Photo |
| N-DL-10 | Lal Gumbad Maulana Abdul Hakim Tomb | Chirag Delhi in Jahanpanah | | Delhi | 28°32′45″N 77°13′35″E | Upload Photo |
| N-DL-11 | Tomb of Bahlol Lodi. Built 1451 - 1488 A.D. | Chirag Delhi, in Jahanpanah | | Delhi | 28°32′19″N 77°13′35″E | Tomb of Bahlol Lodi. Built 1451 - 1488 A.D. More images |
| N-DL-12 | Ajmeri Gate | Bazar Ajmeri Gate | | Delhi | 28°38′46″N 77°13′26″E | Ajmeri Gate More images |
| N-DL-13 | Alipur Cemetery. Destroyed in 1980's. | Delhi-Alipur Camping group. | | Delhi | | Upload Photo |
| N-DL-14 | Ashoka'a pillar | Ferozabad (Ferozshah Kila (Feroz Shah Kotla or Vikram Nagar Colony) | | Delhi | 28°38′09″N 77°14′43″E | Ashoka'a pillar More images |
| N-DL-15 | Barakhamba Cemetery. (Delisted) | Imperial City | | Delhi | | Upload Photo |
| N-DL-16 | Chauburji. Built 1651 - 1388 A.D. | Delhi ridge near Hindu Rao Hospital | Chauburja Marg, Delhi Ridge | Delhi | 28°40′54″N 77°12′55″E | Chauburji. Built 1651 - 1388 A.D. More images |
| N-DL-17 | Eremo Cemetery | near Kishanaganj Railway Station | | Delhi | 28°38′19″N 77°12′44″E | Upload Photo |
| N-DL-18 | Red Fort, which includes Naubat Khana, Diwan-i-Am, Mumtaz Mahal, Rang Mahal, Baithak, Muthamman Burj, Diwan-i-Khas, Moti Masjid, Sawan and Bhadon, Shahi Burj, Hammam with all surrounding including the gardens, paths, terraces and water courses. Built 1638 - 1648 CE | Red Fort | | Old Delhi | 28°39′21″N 77°14′31″E | Red Fort, which includes Naubat Khana, Diwan-i-Am, Mumtaz Mahal, Rang Mahal, Baithak, Muthamman Burj, Diwan-i-Khas, Moti Masjid, Sawan and Bhadon, Shahi Burj, Hammam with all surrounding including the gardens, paths, terraces and water courses. Built 1638 - 1648 CE More images |
| N-DL-19 | Delhi Gate | Bahadur Shah Zafar Marg, Daryaganj | | Delhi | 28°38′28″N 77°14′25″E | Delhi Gate More images |
| N-DL-20 | Enclosure containing the grave of Lt. Edwards and others, killed in 1857. | North Delhi ridge near Flag Staff Tower, Civil Lines. | | Delhi | 28°41′20″N 77°13′08″E | Upload Photo |
| N-DL-21 | Enclosure wall with Tomb of Mirza Najaf Khan | | Safdarjang Fly over, near Safdarjung Airport, Jor Bagh | Delhi | 28°34′51″N 77°12′49″E | Enclosure wall with Tomb of Mirza Najaf Khan More images |
| N-DL-22 | Flagstaff Tower | 400 yards North of Cheuburji Mosque | Delhi ridge (Kamla Nehru Ridge Forest) | Delhi | 28°41′17″N 77°13′05″E | Flagstaff Tower More images |
| N-DL-23 | Jantar Mantar | Connaught Place, New Delhi | Sansad Marg | Delhi | 28°37′38″N 77°12′59″E | Jantar Mantar More images |
| N-DL-24 | Kashmiri Gate and portion of the City Wall on either side of the Kashmiri Gate on the side and on the other up to and including the water Bastions at the Northern corner of the wall and also including the dith outside the City wall where this is exposed. | Kashmiri Gate | | Delhi | 28°39′59″N 77°13′44″E | Kashmiri Gate and portion of the City Wall on either side of the Kashmiri Gate on the side and on the other up to and including the water Bastions at the Northern corner of the wall and also including the dith outside the City wall where this is exposed. More images |
| N-DL-25 | Kotla Ferozabad, or Feroz Shah Kotla (with the remaining walls, bastions and gateways and gardens, the old Mosque, and well and all other ruins buildings it contains. | Two furlongs east of jail and three furlongs due south of S.E. Corner of Shahjahanabad, Delhi. | Bahadur Shah Zafar Marg | Delhi | 28°38′07″N 77°14′44″E | Kotla Ferozabad, or Feroz Shah Kotla (with the remaining walls, bastions and gateways and gardens, the old Mosque, and well and all other ruins buildings it contains. More images |
| N-DL-26 | Lal Darwaza, the northern gate of the outer walls of the Delhi of Sher Shah Suri. Also known as Khooni Darwaza. | Three furlongs due south of Delhi Gate, | Near Kotla Feroz Shah (Feroz Shah Kotla) | Delhi | 28°38′09″N 77°14′27″E | Lal Darwaza, the northern gate of the outer walls of the Delhi of Sher Shah Suri. Also known as Khooni Darwaza. More images |
| N-DL-27 | Lothian Cemetery | Kashmiri Gate | | Delhi | 28°39′41″N 77°14′10″E | Lothian Cemetery More images |
| N-DL-28 | Qudsia Mosque | Qudsia Garden (Qudsia Bagh) | | Delhi | 28°40′14″N 77°13′51″E | Qudsia Mosque More images |
| N-DL-29 | Mutiny Memorial | In front of Old Telegraph Building, Kashmiri Gate, | | Delhi | 28°39′44″N 77°14′04″E | Mutiny Memorial More images |
| N-DL-30 | Nicholson (Or Kashmiri Gate) Cemetery | Kashmiri Gate | | Delhi | 28°40′07″N 77°13′29″E | Nicholson (Or Kashmiri Gate) Cemetery More images |
| N-DL-31 | Nicholson statue and its platform and the surrounding gardens paths and enclosure wall. Removed in 1970's and subsequently on Dec3 2024 deleted from this list. | | | Delhi | | Upload Photo |
| N-DL-32 | Old Baoli immediately to the west of Hindu Rao's House. | On the Delhi ridge | Inside Hindu Rao Hospital, Delhi Ridge | Delhi | 28°40′34″N 77°12′44″E | Old Baoli immediately to the west of Hindu Rao's House. More images |
| N-DL-33 | The Old Entrance Gateway of the Qudsia Garden (Qudsia Bagh). | Qudsia Delhi | Qudsia Garden | Delhi | 28°40′14″N 77°13′52″E | The Old Entrance Gateway of the Qudsia Garden (Qudsia Bagh). More images |
| N-DL-34 | The Pirghaib to the north and near Hindu Rao's House | On the Delhi ridge, Delhi | Inside Hindu Rao Hospital | Delhi | 28°40′35″N 77°12′48″E | The Pirghaib to the north and near Hindu Rao's House More images |
| N-DL-35 | Portion of City wall near which Brig.Gen. John Nicholson was mortally Wounded on 14th Sept., 1857. | On the Delhi ridge | Near Kabuli Gate | Delhi | | Portion of City wall near which Brig.Gen. John Nicholson was mortally Wounded on 14th Sept., 1857. |
| N-DL-36 | The Punjabi gate in the Roshanara Bagh | Opposite Municipal Board school, Subji Mandi | Roshanara Bagh | Delhi | 28°40′25″N 77°12′06″E | The Punjabi gate in the Roshanara Bagh More images |
| N-DL-37 | Purana Quila (Inderpat) or Delhi With all its walls Arcades, gateways and Bastions, gardens, the Mosque of Sher Shah (Kila Kohna Masjid - Qila-i-Kuhna mosque). The Sher Mandala and entrances to Subterranean passages. | Two miles south of the Delhi Gate of Shahjahanabad, Delhi | Indrapath, Mathura Road | Delhi | 28°36′34″N 77°14′36″E | Purana Quila (Inderpat) or Delhi With all its walls Arcades, gateways and Bastions, gardens, the Mosque of Sher Shah (Kila Kohna Masjid - Qila-i-Kuhna mosque). The Sher Mandala and entrances to Subterranean passages. More images |
| N-DL-38 | Rajpur (Mutiny cemetery) gateway, rest now built over by residential buildings | Old Rajpur Cantonment, North District. | opposite Maurice Nagar police station, near Patel Chest Hospital. | Delhi | | Rajpur (Mutiny cemetery) gateway, rest now built over by residential buildings More images |
| N-DL-39 | The remaining gateways of the old 'Magazine' with their adjoining buildings. | The Post office, Delhi | South of Kashmere Gate Post office | Delhi | 28°37′56″N 77°13′10″E | The remaining gateways of the old 'Magazine' with their adjoining buildings. |
| N-DL-40 | Sher Shah Suri's gate with the adjoining curon walls and Bastions and the remains of the double line of structure to its front | Opposite purana Qila immediately North-east of the Khairul Manazil Mosque | Near Old Fort, Mathura Road | Delhi | 28°36′31″N 77°14′21″E | Sher Shah Suri's gate with the adjoining curon walls and Bastions and the remains of the double line of structure to its front More images |
| N-DL-41 | Site of Siege battery Known as the Sammy House Battery bearing the following Inscriptions Battery, Sammy house, Major Remington Tank, RA Commanding armament 89 pounds. To command ground near Mori Bastion. | 300 Yards East of Mutiny Memorial | East of the Hospital in police line, Police Lines | Delhi | 28°37′56″N 77°13′10″E | Upload Photo |
| N-DL-42 | Site of siege Battery with inscription. Demolished in 1995. | East of the Hospital in police Line | | Delhi | | Upload Photo |
| N-DL-43 | Site of siege Battery with inscription. Demolished in 1980's. | Compound of Curzon House | | Delhi | | Upload Photo |
| N-DL-44 | Site of siege Battery with inscription. | In the garden near south west entrance to Delhi Golf Club Ground | | Delhi | | Upload Photo |
| N-DL-45 | Sunehri Masjid (Red Fort) | Red Fort | near Delhi Fort | Delhi | 28°39′02″N 77°14′22″E | Sunehri Masjid (Red Fort) More images |
| N-DL-46 | Tomb of Capt. Mac. Barnatt & others who fall in an attack on Kishanganj. Demolished. | Kishan Ganj | | Delhi | | Upload Photo |
| N-DL-47 | Tomb of Ghaziuddin Khan | Ajmeri Gate | | Delhi | 28°38′45″N 77°13′19″E | Tomb of Ghaziuddin Khan More images |
| N-DL-48 | Tomb of Roshanara Begum & Baradari | Roshnara Bagh, Sabzi Mandi | | Delhi | 28°40′25″N 77°12′01″E | Tomb of Roshanara Begum & Baradari |
| N-DL-49 | Tomb of Razia Begum (Razia Sultana) in Mohalla Bulbuli Khana | Shahjahanabad | Turkman Gate, Old Delhi | Delhi | 28°38′46″N 77°13′53″E | Tomb of Razia Begum (Razia Sultana) in Mohalla Bulbuli Khana More images |
| N-DL-50 | Tomb of Safdarjung (Mirza Muqim Mansur Ali Khan) with all the enclosure walls, gateways, gardens and the mosque on the eastern side of the garden. | Lodhi Road, New Delhi | | Delhi | 28°35′22″N 77°12′38″E | Tomb of Safdarjung (Mirza Muqim Mansur Ali Khan) with all the enclosure walls, gateways, gardens and the mosque on the eastern side of the garden. More images |
| N-DL-51 | Tripolia Gateways | Delhi-Karnal Road | | Delhi | 28°41′07″N 77°11′45″E | Tripolia Gateways More images |
| N-DL-52 | Agrasen ki Baoli | Near Jantar Mantar (Delhi) | Hailey Road, Connought Place | Delhi | 28°37′34″N 77°13′30″E | Agrasen ki Baoli More images |
| N-DL-53 | Tomb of Darya Khan | Kidwai Nagar East | | Delhi | 28°34′20″N 77°13′00″E | Tomb of Darya Khan More images |
| N-DL-54 | Baoli at Ghiaspur, also known as Nizamuddin Baoli | Nizamuddin West | | Delhi | 28°35′31″N 77°14′31″E | Baoli at Ghiaspur, also known as Nizamuddin Baoli More images |
| N-DL-55 | Tomb of Mirza Muzaffer, Chota Batasha No. 153, Ghiaspur | Nizammuddin | | Delhi | 28°35′46″N 77°14′59″E | Tomb of Mirza Muzaffer, Chota Batasha No. 153, Ghiaspur More images |
| N-DL-56 | Tomb of Amir Khusro, Ghiaspur | Nizamuddin West | | Delhi | 28°35′28″N 77°14′31″E | Tomb of Amir Khusro, Ghiaspur More images |
| N-DL-57 | Tomb of Mirza Muzaffer, Bara Batasha (Bara Batashewala) No. 151 Ghiaspur | Nizammuddin | | Delhi | 28°35′45″N 77°14′56″E | Tomb of Mirza Muzaffer, Bara Batasha (Bara Batashewala) No. 151 Ghiaspur More images |
| N-DL-58 | Tomb of Nizamuddin Auliya, Ghiaspur No. 197 | Nizamuddin West | | Delhi | 28°35′29″N 77°14′31″E | Tomb of Nizamuddin Auliya, Ghiaspur No. 197 More images |
| N-DL-59 | Unknown tomb Ghiaspur 153, | Nizammuddin | Across the North Gate of the Humayun's Tomb | Delhi | 28°35′45″N 77°15′02″E | Unknown tomb Ghiaspur 153, More images |
| N-DL-60 | i. The tomb of Ferozshah ii (Firuz Shah Tughlaq). Domed Building to the west of No.1 iii. Dalan between 1&2 iv. Domed Building & its court to the south of No. 3, v. Dalans and all ruined Buildings to the north of no. 1 and existing up to No.10 vi. Five Chhatris to the case of No. 1& No.5 vii. Old Gate to the north of No.6 viii. Three Chhatris to the north-west of No.7 ix. Ruined courtyard and its Dalans with the Domed building to the north-west to the No.8 x. Old wall running east from No.4 xi. 2.23 Acres of land surrounding the above monuments and bounded on the North by house of Chhange and Mehra Chand sons of Hansram and house of Uderam, son of Kusha South Ghairmunkan Resta East By village site belonging to village community house of Nots Zadar sons of Jai Singh Chhamar and field Nos. 338 & 331 belonging to Naider and others West By field no. 185 belonging to Udaram, son of Kusal Jat and field No. 186 belonging to Jagins and Sajawal Rajput, No. 195 Ghairmunkin Johar, common of Jats and Musalmans and filed no. 196, Ghairmunkin Pall. | Hauz Khas | | Delhi | 28°33′11″N 77°11′36″E | i. The tomb of Ferozshah ii (Firuz Shah Tughlaq). Domed Building to the west of No.1 iii. Dalan between 1&2 iv. Domed Building & its court to the south of No. 3, v. Dalans and all ruined Buildings to the north of no. 1 and existing up to No.10 vi. Five Chhatris to the case of No. 1& No.5 vii. Old Gate to the north of No.6 viii. Three Chhatris to the north-west of No.7 ix. Ruined courtyard and its Dalans with the Domed building to the north-west to the No.8 x. Old wall running east from No.4 xi. 2.23 Acres of land surrounding the above monuments and bounded on the North by house of Chhange and Mehra Chand sons of Hansram and house of Uderam, son of Kusha South Ghairmunkan Resta East By village site belonging to village community house of Nots Zadar sons of Jai Singh Chhamar and field Nos. 338 & 331 belonging to Naider and others West By field no. 185 belonging to Udaram, son of Kusal Jat and field No. 186 belonging to Jagins and Sajawal Rajput, No. 195 Ghairmunkin Johar, common of Jats and Musalmans and filed no. 196, Ghairmunkin Pall. More images |
| N-DL-61 | Bag-i-Alam Gumbad with a Mosque | Humayunpur | Deer Park, Hauz Khas | Delhi | 28°33′22″N 77°11′54″E | Bag-i-Alam Gumbad with a Mosque More images |
| N-DL-62 | Kali Gumti | Humayunpur (Hauz Khas) | Near Deer Park, Hauz Khas | Delhi | 28°33′24″N 77°11′53″E | Kali Gumti More images |
| N-DL-63 | Tohfewala Gumbad | Humayunpur Deer Park (Hauz Khas) | | Delhi | 28°33′27″N 77°11′56″E | Tohfewala Gumbad More images |
| N-DL-64 | Arab Serai | Patti, Ghiapur in Hauz Inderpat | | Delhi | 28°35′28″N 77°14′54″E | Arab Serai More images |
| N-DL-65 | The Gate way of Arab Sarai facing North towards Purana Qila | Arab Sarai | | Delhi | 28°35′29″N 77°14′53″E | The Gate way of Arab Sarai facing North towards Purana Qila More images |
| N-DL-66 | The Gate way of Arab Sarai facing East towards the tomb of Humayun | Arab Sarai | | Delhi | 28°35′28″N 77°14′56″E | The Gate way of Arab Sarai facing East towards the tomb of Humayun More images |
| N-DL-67 | Remaining Gateways of Arab Sarai and of Abadi-Bagh-Buhalima | Near Arab Sarai Village | | Delhi | 28°35′29″N 77°14′52″E | Remaining Gateways of Arab Sarai and of Abadi-Bagh-Buhalima |
| N-DL-68 | Lakhar wal Gumbad (Tomb) | Inderpat Estate (Sunder Nursery), Near Delhi Public School | Mathura Road, Nizamuddin | Delhi | 28°35′52″N 77°14′38″E | Lakhar wal Gumbad (Tomb) More images |
| N-DL-69 | Sunderwala Burj | Inderpat Estate (Sunder Nursery) | Near Humayun's Tomb, Nizamuddin | Delhi | 28°35′46″N 77°14′43″E | Sunderwala Burj More images |
| N-DL-70 | Sunderwala Mahal | Inderpat Estate (Sunder Nursery) | | Delhi | 28°35′46″N 77°14′48″E | Sunderwala Mahal More images |
| N-DL-71 | Bijay Mandal, neighbouring domes, buildings and dalan to north of Begumpur | In village Kalusarai (Sarvapriya Vihar), part of historic Jahanpanah | | Delhi | 28°32′27″N 77°12′20″E | Bijay Mandal, neighbouring domes, buildings and dalan to north of Begumpur More images |
| N-DL-72 | Old Lodhi Bridge (Athpula aka Khairpur ka Pul) with approaches. Built 1556 - 1605 A.D. | Near Tomb of Sikandar Lodi, Khairpur | Lodhi Gardens, Lodhi Road | Delhi | 28°35′47″N 77°13′22″E | Old Lodhi Bridge (Athpula aka Khairpur ka Pul) with approaches. Built 1556 - 1605 A.D. More images |
| N-DL-73 | Mosque with the dalans and courtyard and the Bara Gumbad (the domed entrance to the mosque) | Khairpur | Lodhi Gardens | Delhi | 28°35′35″N 77°13′13″E | Mosque with the dalans and courtyard and the Bara Gumbad (the domed entrance to the mosque) More images |
| N-DL-74 | The tomb of Mohammed Shah known as Mubarak Khan- Ka-Gumbaz | Khairpur | Lodhi Gardens | Delhi | 28°35′27″N 77°13′06″E | The tomb of Mohammed Shah known as Mubarak Khan- Ka-Gumbaz More images |
| N-DL-75 | Tomb of Sikandar Lodi with its enclosure wall and bastions, gates & compound. Built 1494 A.D. | Khairpur | Lodhi Gardens, Lodhi Road | Delhi | 28°35′47″N 77°13′18″E | Tomb of Sikandar Lodi with its enclosure wall and bastions, gates & compound. Built 1494 A.D. More images |
| N-DL-76 | Unknown tomb with blue tiles decoration known as Shisha Gumbad | Khairpur | Lodhi Gardens, Lodhi Road | Delhi | 28°35′37″N 77°13′13″E | Unknown tomb with blue tiles decoration known as Shisha Gumbad More images |
| N-DL-77 | Bandi or Poti ka Gumbad III-280 | Kharera village between Hauz Khas and Qutab road | | Delhi | 28°33′12″N 77°12′14″E | Bandi or Poti ka Gumbad III-280 More images |
| N-DL-78 | Biran-Ka-Gumbad-282 | Kharera village between Hauz Khas and Qutab road | Green Park, Delhi | Delhi | 28°33′20″N 77°12′10″E | Biran-Ka-Gumbad-282 More images |
| N-DL-79 | Biwi or Dadi-ka-Gumbad-281 | Kharera village between Hauz Khas and Qutab road | Green Park, Delhi | Delhi | 28°33′12″N 77°12′13″E | Biwi or Dadi-ka-Gumbad-281 More images |
| N-DL-80 | Chor Minar No. 289 Vol III | Kharehra (Hauz Khas Enclave) | | Delhi | 28°32′52″N 77°12′20″E | Chor Minar No. 289 Vol III More images |
| N-DL-81 | Choti Gunti | Kharehra village Green Park, Delhi | | Delhi | 28°33′12″N 77°12′05″E | Choti Gunti More images |
| N-DL-82 | Idgah of Kharehra No. 287, Vol III | Kharehra village, Hauz Khas Enclave | north west of Chor Minar | Delhi | 28°32′55″N 77°12′18″E | Idgah of Kharehra No. 287, Vol III More images |
| N-DL-83 | Nili Mosque (Neeli Masjid) | Kharehra village, Hauz Khas Enclave | | Delhi | 28°33′13″N 77°12′25″E | Nili Mosque (Neeli Masjid) More images |
| N-DL-84 | Sakri Gumti-284 | Kharehra village | Green Park, Delhi | Delhi | 28°33′12″N 77°12′07″E | Sakri Gumti-284 More images |
| N-DL-85 | Khirki Masjid (Khirkee Masjid) | Village Khirkee | Near Saket, Delhi | Delhi | 28°31′52″N 77°13′10″E | Khirki Masjid (Khirkee Masjid) More images |
| N-DL-86 | Satpula-III –216 | Village Khirkee | Opposite Select City Walk, Khirki Village | Delhi | 28°31′54″N 77°13′24″E | Satpula-III –216 More images |
| N-DL-87 | Tomb of Usuf-Quttal (Yusuf Qattaal's Tomb) | At Khirkee village in field no.81 min, Property of Shamlat deh. | | Delhi | 28°32′02″N 77°13′09″E | Tomb of Usuf-Quttal (Yusuf Qattaal's Tomb) More images |
| N-DL-88 | Jahaz Mahal | Mehrauli | | Delhi | 28°30′51″N 77°10′42″E | Jahaz Mahal More images |
| N-DL-89 | Hauz-i-Shamsi (Shamsid Tallab) together with platform entrance gates. | Mehrauli | | Delhi | 28°30′48″N 77°10′39″E | Hauz-i-Shamsi (Shamsid Tallab) together with platform entrance gates. More images |
| N-DL-90 | Moti Masjid | Mehrauli | With Qutbuddin Bakhtiar Kaki dargah complex | Delhi | 28°31′09″N 77°10′49″E | Moti Masjid More images |
| N-DL-91 | Old Palace (Zafar Mahal) of Bahadur Shah II alias Lal Mahal in Mehrauli | Mehrauli | | Delhi | 28°31′09″N 77°10′47″E | Old Palace (Zafar Mahal) of Bahadur Shah II alias Lal Mahal in Mehrauli More images |
| N-DL-92 | Bara Khamba -285 | Kherera village tombs between Hauz Khas, Qutab road | Green Park, Delhi | Delhi | 28°33′10″N 77°12′08″E | Bara Khamba -285 More images |
| N-DL-93 | The Qutab Archaeological area (Qutb complex) as now fenced in, including the Mosque, Iron Pillar, Minar of Qutab-din, unfinished Minar, all colonnads, screen arches, tomb of Altmash, college, buildings of Aluddin, Tomb of Imam Zamin and all carved stones in the above area with gardens, paths and water channels, and all gateways including the Alai-Darwaza, also all graves in the above area. Built 1193 - 1245 A.D. | Mehrauli | | Delhi | 28°31′28″N 77°11′08″E | The Qutab Archaeological area (Qutb complex) as now fenced in, including the Mosque, Iron Pillar, Minar of Qutab-din, unfinished Minar, all colonnads, screen arches, tomb of Altmash, college, buildings of Aluddin, Tomb of Imam Zamin and all carved stones in the above area with gardens, paths and water channels, and all gateways including the Alai-Darwaza, also all graves in the above area. Built 1193 - 1245 A.D. More images |
| N-DL-94 | Tomb of Adham Khan (Rest House), built 1561 A.D. | Mehrauli | Near Bus Depot, Mehrauli | Delhi | 28°31′23″N 77°10′55″E | Tomb of Adham Khan (Rest House), built 1561 A.D. More images |
| N-DL-95 | Jamali Kamali Mosque and Tomb of Maulana Jamali Kamali (Jamali Kamboh). Built ~1526 - 1535 A.D. | Mehrauli Archaeological Park | | Delhi | 28°31′09″N 77°11′13″E | Jamali Kamali Mosque and Tomb of Maulana Jamali Kamali (Jamali Kamboh). Built ~1526 - 1535 A.D. More images |
| N-DL-96 | Wall mosque | Mehrauli | Mehrauli Archaeological Park | Delhi | 28°31′12″N 77°10′59″E | Wall mosque More images |
| N-DL-97 | Walls of Lal Kot and Qila Rai Pithora's fort from Sohan Gate to Adam Khan's tomb including the ditch where there is an outer wall | Mehrauli Kh. No. 1783, 1765, 1766, 1767, 1770, 1772, 1773, 1798 & 1764 | | Delhi | 28°31′23″N 77°10′55″E | Walls of Lal Kot and Qila Rai Pithora's fort from Sohan Gate to Adam Khan's tomb including the ditch where there is an outer wall |
| N-DL-98 | Walls of Lal Kot and Rai Pithora's fort at the point where they meet together | Near Jamali Kamali's Mosque Mehrauli Kh. No. 1754, Loddho Sarai Kh.No. 86,87 | | Delhi | | Walls of Lal Kot and Rai Pithora's fort at the point where they meet together |
| N-DL-99 | Wall of Rai Pithora's fort including gateways and bastions | Mehrauli | Lado Sarai | Delhi | 28°31′10″N 77°11′37″E | Wall of Rai Pithora's fort including gateways and bastions |
| N-DL-100 | Gates and walls of Mubarakpur, Kotla in village Mubarakpur | village Mubarakpur, Kotla | | Delhi | | Gates and walls of Mubarakpur, Kotla in village Mubarakpur More images |
| N-DL-101 | Moti-ki-Masjid (Moth Ki Masjid) | Behind South Extension Part II. | | Delhi | 28°33′45″N 77°13′04″E | Moti-ki-Masjid (Moth Ki Masjid) More images |
| N-DL-102 | Inchla Wali Gunti (Delisted) | village Mubarakpur, Kotla | | Delhi | 28°37′56″N 77°13′10″E | Upload Photo |
| N-DL-103 | Kala Gumbad | village Mubarakpur, Kotla | | Delhi | 28°34′12″N 77°13′08″E | Kala Gumbad More images |
| N-DL-104 | Tombs of Bade-Khan, and Mubarakpur Kotla, Kotla | village Mubarakpur, Kotla | | Delhi | 28°34′23″N 77°13′12″E | Tombs of Bade-Khan, and Mubarakpur Kotla, Kotla More images |
| N-DL-105 | Tombs of Chote Khan, Mubarakpur | Kotla | | Delhi | 28°34′23″N 77°13′14″E | Tombs of Chote Khan, Mubarakpur More images |
| N-DL-106 | Tomb of Mubarak Shah in Mubarakpur, Kotla. Built 1434 A.D. | village Mubarakpur, Kotla | Kotla Mubarakpur Complex, near South Ex I | Delhi | 28°34′22″N 77°13′22″E | Tomb of Mubarak Shah in Mubarakpur, Kotla. Built 1434 A.D. More images |
| N-DL-107 | Mosque attached to Mubarak shah Tomb | village Mubarakpur, Kotla | Kotla Mubarakpur, South Ex (Part 1) | Delhi | 28°34′20″N 77°13′20″E | Mosque attached to Mubarak shah Tomb More images |
| N-DL-108 | Tomb of Bhura Khan | village Mubarakpur, Kotla | Kotla Mubarakpur, South Ex (Part 1) | Delhi | 28°34′20″N 77°13′15″E | Tomb of Bhura Khan More images |
| N-DL-109 | Tin Burji Walla Gumbad | Mohammed pur village II, 304 | Near Bhikaji Cama Place | Delhi | 28°33′58″N 77°11′18″E | Tin Burji Walla Gumbad More images |
| N-DL-110 | Unnamed tomb | Mohammed pur village, 305 | | Delhi | | Unnamed tomb More images |
| N-DL-111 | Baoli. Built 1451 - 1526 A.D. | Munirka II. 318. | In front of Wazirpur ka Gumbad | Delhi | 28°33′44″N 77°10′30″E | Baoli. Built 1451 - 1526 A.D. More images |
| N-DL-112 | Munda Gumbad | Munirka | sector 4 R K Puram | Delhi | 28°33′40″N 77°10′44″E | Munda Gumbad More images |
| N-DL-113 | Unnamed Mosque from 15th century A.D. | Munirka 314. | | Delhi | 28°33′46″N 77°10′29″E | Unnamed Mosque from 15th century A.D. More images |
| N-DL-114 | Unnamed Tomb (At the center of image) | Munirka 313. | Sector 5 R. K. Puram | Delhi | 28°33′46″N 77°10′31″E | Unnamed Tomb (At the center of image) |
| N-DL-115 | Unnamed Tomb | Munirka 315. | R. K. Puram | Delhi | 28°33′46″N 77°10′29″E | Unnamed Tomb |
| N-DL-116 | Unnamed Tomb (At the right of Image) | Munirka 316. | | Delhi | 28°33′46″N 77°10′31″E | Unnamed Tomb (At the right of Image) |
| N-DL-117 | Unnamed Tomb (Small tomb on right) | Munirka 317. | | Delhi | 28°33′46″N 77°10′31″E | Unnamed Tomb (Small tomb on right) |
| N-DL-118 | i Unnamed Mosque ii Unnamed Tomb (At the left of Image) | Munirka 321& Munirka 322 | | Delhi | 28°33′44″N 77°10′30″E | i Unnamed Mosque ii Unnamed Tomb (At the left of Image) |
| N-DL-119 | Wajirpur ka Gumbad | Munirka 312. | R. K. Puram, Sector 5 | Delhi | 28°33′46″N 77°10′30″E | Wajirpur ka Gumbad More images |
| N-DL-120 | The Afsah-walla-ki-Masjid (Assarwala mosque) situated outside the west gate of Humayun's tomb with its dalans and paved court bounded on the east by Humayun's tomb on the west by Abadi Arab Sarai on the north by road and Khasra No. 252 and on the south by Abadi Arab Sarai | Nizammudin | | Delhi | 28°35′34″N 77°14′52″E | The Afsah-walla-ki-Masjid (Assarwala mosque) situated outside the west gate of Humayun's tomb with its dalans and paved court bounded on the east by Humayun's tomb on the west by Abadi Arab Sarai on the north by road and Khasra No. 252 and on the south by Abadi Arab Sarai More images |
| N-DL-121 | Bara Khamba (Barakhamba) outside north entrance to shrine | Nizammudin | | Delhi | 28°35′33″N 77°14′33″E | Bara Khamba (Barakhamba) outside north entrance to shrine More images |
| N-DL-122 | Bara Pulah bridge near Nizammudin. Built 1621-1622 A.D. | South of Nizammudin | | Delhi | 28°35′02″N 77°15′12″E | Bara Pulah bridge near Nizammudin. Built 1621-1622 A.D. More images |
| N-DL-123 | Chausath Khamba and tomb of Mirza Nizammudin Aziz-ka-Kokaltash (son of Ataga Khan) | Nizammudin | | Delhi | 28°35′28″N 77°14′35″E | Chausath Khamba and tomb of Mirza Nizammudin Aziz-ka-Kokaltash (son of Ataga Khan) More images |
| N-DL-124 | Grave of Jahanara Begum | Nizammudin | Nizamuddin Dargah Complex | Delhi | 28°35′28″N 77°14′31″E | Grave of Jahanara Begum More images |
| N-DL-125 | Grave of Mohammed Shah | Nizammudin | | Delhi | 28°35′29″N 77°14′31″E | Grave of Mohammed Shah More images |
| N-DL-126 | Grave of Mirza Jahangir | Nizammudin | | Delhi | 28°35′29″N 77°14′31″E | Grave of Mirza Jahangir More images |
| N-DL-127 | Humayun's tomb, its platforms, garden, enclosure walls and gateways Khasra No. 258 bounded on the east by Khasra No.180&181&244 of Miri Singh and on west by Kh. No. 268&253 on the north by Khasra No. 266, on the south by Kh No. 245 of Miri Singh & Kh. No. 248 & 249 of Sayyed Mohummad | Nizammudin | | Delhi | 28°35′36″N 77°15′02″E | Humayun's tomb, its platforms, garden, enclosure walls and gateways Khasra No. 258 bounded on the east by Khasra No.180&181&244 of Miri Singh and on west by Kh. No. 268&253 on the north by Khasra No. 266, on the south by Kh No. 245 of Miri Singh & Kh. No. 248 & 249 of Sayyed Mohummad More images |
| N-DL-128 | Nila Gumbad outside the south corner of the enclosure of Humayun's tomb (Kh. No. 243) bounded on the east by Kh. No. 182, on the west by Humayun's tomb, on the north by Kh. No. 181 & on the south by Kh. No. 244 of Miri Singh | Nizammudin | Near Nizamuddin Railway Station | Delhi | 28°35′31″N 77°15′11″E | Nila Gumbad outside the south corner of the enclosure of Humayun's tomb (Kh. No. 243) bounded on the east by Kh. No. 182, on the west by Humayun's tomb, on the north by Kh. No. 181 & on the south by Kh. No. 244 of Miri Singh More images |
| N-DL-129 | Nili Chhatri or Subz Burz. | Nizammudin East | Traffic circle | Delhi | 28°35′35″N 77°14′37″E | Nili Chhatri or Subz Burz. More images |
| N-DL-130 | Tomb of Afsar-wala immediately near to the south of Afsar-wala-ki-Masjid | Nizammudin | | Delhi | 28°35′33″N 77°14′52″E | Tomb of Afsar-wala immediately near to the south of Afsar-wala-ki-Masjid More images |
| N-DL-131 | Tomb of Ataga Khan | Nizamuddin West | | Delhi | 28°35′29″N 77°14′32″E | Tomb of Ataga Khan More images |
| N-DL-132 | The tomb of Isa Khan Niyazi with its surrounding enclosure walls and turrest garden gateways and mosque (Kh. No. 281 ) bounded on the east by Arab Sarai Kh. No.236 on the west by Kh. No. 283 graveyard of Piare Lal and K.No. 283 of Bddon on the north by Kh. No. 236 of Pandit Brij Vallabh and on the south by Arab Sarai Kh. No. 238. | Nizammudin | Humayun's Tomb Complex | Delhi | 28°35′32″N 77°14′46″E | The tomb of Isa Khan Niyazi with its surrounding enclosure walls and turrest garden gateways and mosque (Kh. No. 281 ) bounded on the east by Arab Sarai Kh. No.236 on the west by Kh. No. 283 graveyard of Piare Lal and K.No. 283 of Bddon on the north by Kh. No. 236 of Pandit Brij Vallabh and on the south by Arab Sarai Kh. No. 238. More images |
| N-DL-133 | Tomb of Khan-i-Khana | Nizammudin | Near Humayun's Tomb | Delhi | 28°35′17″N 77°14′52″E | Tomb of Khan-i-Khana More images |
| N-DL-134 | Tomb with three domes near Rly. Station. Missing. | Nizammudin | | Delhi | | Upload Photo |
| N-DL-135 | Sikargah Kushak-II -327, built by Feroze Shah Tughlaq between 1321 - 1414 A.D. | Old Kushak Village | Within Teen Murti Bhavan complex, adjacent to Nehru Planetarium | Delhi | 28°36′12″N 77°11′53″E | Sikargah Kushak-II -327, built by Feroze Shah Tughlaq between 1321 - 1414 A.D. More images |
| N-DL-136 | Gateways of Badli-Ki-Sarai | Village Pipalthala | Grand Trunk Road towards Karnal, near Adarsh Nagar | Delhi | 28°43′09″N 77°10′04″E | Gateways of Badli-Ki-Sarai More images |
| N-DL-137 | Tomb of Sheikh Kaburuddin also known as Rakabwala Gumbad (Lal Gumbad) in field no.84 min. situated at Sarai Shah 31 property of Thoks Shahpur and Adhchini | Malaviya Nagar | | Delhi | 28°32′24″N 77°12′49″E | Tomb of Sheikh Kaburuddin also known as Rakabwala Gumbad (Lal Gumbad) in field no.84 min. situated at Sarai Shah 31 property of Thoks Shahpur and Adhchini More images |
| N-DL-138 | Ruined line of walls, bastions & gateways of Siri Fort, Kh. No. 88, 265 &447 at village Shahpur Jat | Shahpur Jat | Asiad Village, Panchsheel Park | Delhi | 28°33′13″N 77°12′56″E | Ruined line of walls, bastions & gateways of Siri Fort, Kh. No. 88, 265 &447 at village Shahpur Jat More images |
| N-DL-139 | Thana wala Shahpur Jat: Internal buildings of Siri Mehammadi wali-Kh. No. 14 Shahpur Jat Bul-Bul-Ki-Kh. No. 256 Shahpur Jat Makhdum ki Kh. No. 255 Shahpur Jat Baradari Shahpur Jat, Motiyan wala dome Shahpur Jat | Shahpur Jat | Opposite Siri Fort Road, Hauz Khas | Delhi | 28°32′49″N 77°12′31″E | Thana wala Shahpur Jat: Internal buildings of Siri Mehammadi wali-Kh. No. 14 Shahpur Jat Bul-Bul-Ki-Kh. No. 256 Shahpur Jat Makhdum ki Kh. No. 255 Shahpur Jat Baradari Shahpur Jat, Motiyan wala dome Shahpur Jat |
| N-DL-140 | Nai-ka-kot. | Tughlaqabad Kotla | 2 km beyond Tughlaqabad Fort on Mehrauli-Badarpur Road | Delhi | 28°30′16″N 77°16′33″E | Nai-ka-kot. More images |
| N-DL-141 | Tomb of Ghiyasuddin Tughlaq. walls and bastions, gates and cause way including the tomb of Daud Khan. | M.B. Road, Tughlaqabad. | | Delhi | 28°30′33″N 77°15′41″E | Tomb of Ghiyasuddin Tughlaq. walls and bastions, gates and cause way including the tomb of Daud Khan. More images |
| N-DL-142 | Tomb of Mohammed Tughlaq Shah at Tughlaqabad | Badarpur Zail | | Delhi | 28°30′33″N 77°15′41″E | Tomb of Mohammed Tughlaq Shah at Tughlaqabad More images |
| N-DL-143 | Walls of old city of Tughlaqabad. | Badarpur Zail | | Delhi | 28°30′28″N 77°16′22″E | Walls of old city of Tughlaqabad. More images |
| N-DL-144 | Walls, gateways bastions and internal buildings of both inner and outer citadels of Tughlaqabad Fort | Tughlaqabad. | M.B. Road | Delhi | 28°30′53″N 77°15′38″E | Walls, gateways bastions and internal buildings of both inner and outer citadels of Tughlaqabad Fort More images |
| N-DL-145 | Walls, gate and bastions of Adilabad (Mohammadbad) and causeway leading to there from Tughlaqabad. | Tughlaqabad. | | Delhi | 28°30′19″N 77°16′04″E | Walls, gate and bastions of Adilabad (Mohammadbad) and causeway leading to there from Tughlaqabad. More images |
| N-DL-146 | Wazirabad Tomb, (Tomb of Shah Alam I) | Wazirabad | | Delhi | 28°42′42″N 77°13′41″E | Wazirabad Tomb, (Tomb of Shah Alam I) More images |
| N-DL-147 | Wazirabad mosque | Wazirabad | | Delhi | 28°42′42″N 77°13′41″E | Wazirabad mosque More images |
| N-DL-148 | Wazirabad Bridge | Wazirabad | | Delhi | 28°42′44″N 77°13′41″E | Wazirabad Bridge More images |
| N-DL-149 | Mound known as Jaga Bai comprise in part of surve plot no. 167. Missing. | Jamia nagar | | Delhi | | Upload Photo |
| N-DL-150 | Ashoka rock Edict | Kailash Hill, East of Kailash colony | | Delhi | 28°33′31″N 77°15′24″E | Ashoka rock Edict More images |
| N-DL-151 | Madhi Masjid | Ladho Sarai, near Mehrauli | Near Jain Dada Badi, Mehrauli | Delhi | 28°30′53″N 77°11′05″E | Madhi Masjid More images |
| N-DL-152 | Rajon-ki-Bain (Rajon Ki Baoli) with Mosque and Chhatri | Ladho Sarai | Mehrauli Archaeological Park | Delhi | 28°31′13″N 77°11′00″E | Rajon-ki-Bain (Rajon Ki Baoli) with Mosque and Chhatri More images |
| N-DL-153 | Badun Gate | Ladho Sarai, Mehrauli | | Delhi | 28°31′26″N 77°12′06″E | Badun Gate More images |
| N-DL-154 | Gateways of Lal kot | Ladho Sarai | | Delhi | 28°31′48″N 77°10′47″E | Gateways of Lal kot More images |
| N-DL-155 | Gateway of Rai Pithoria's fort | Ladho Sarai | | Delhi | | Gateway of Rai Pithoria's fort |
| N-DL-156 | Walls of Rai Pithora's fort and Jahan Panah at the point where they meet together | Hauz Rani abd Lado Sarai | Adchini | Delhi | 28°32′19″N 77°12′48″E | Upload Photo |
| N-DL-157 | Tomb of Sultan Ghari | Nalikpur Kohi | near Vasant Kunj | Delhi | 28°32′00″N 77°08′13″E | Tomb of Sultan Ghari More images |
| N-DL-158 | Baoli known as diving well locally known as (Candak-ki-baoli or Gandhak-ki-baoli) | Behind Mehrauli Archaeological Park, Mehrauli | | Delhi | 28°31′15″N 77°10′53″E | Baoli known as diving well locally known as (Candak-ki-baoli or Gandhak-ki-baoli) More images |
| N-DL-159 | Enclosure containing the tomb of Shah Alam Bahadur Shah, Shah Alam II and Akbar Shah II | Mehrauli / Wazirabad | within Sufi saint, Qutbuddin Bakhtiar Kaki dargah complex | Delhi | 28°31′08″N 77°10′49″E | Enclosure containing the tomb of Shah Alam Bahadur Shah, Shah Alam II and Akbar Shah II More images |
| N-DL-160 | Hauz-i-Shamsi with central red stone pavilion situated at Mehrauli in field No. 157-81, 1586-97, 1614 &1624 | Adjacent to Jahaz Mahal, Mehrauli | | Delhi | 28°30′48″N 77°10′37″E | Hauz-i-Shamsi with central red stone pavilion situated at Mehrauli in field No. 157-81, 1586-97, 1614 &1624 More images |
| N-DL-161 | Iron Pillar Hindu | Mehrauli | In the forecourt of Quwwat-ul-Islam mosque, Qutb complex | Delhi | 28°31′29″N 77°11′06″E | Iron Pillar Hindu More images |
| N-DL-162 | Ancient Mosque (Babur’s Period) together with adjacent area comprised in part of Survey plot No. 177 | Palam | | Delhi | 28°35′34″N 77°04′41″E | Upload Photo |
| N-DL-163 | Sheesh Mahal. Built 1653 A.D. | Village Hyderpur | Shalimar Garden (Shalimar Bagh) | Delhi | 28°43′12″N 77°09′15″E | Sheesh Mahal. Built 1653 A.D. More images |
| N-DL-164 | Ashokan Pillar | On the Delhi ridge near Hindu Rao Hospital | | Delhi | 28°40′26″N 77°12′42″E | Ashokan Pillar More images |
| N-DL-165 | Sarai Shahji | Malaviya Nagar | | Delhi | 28°32′30″N 77°12′22″E | Sarai Shahji More images |
| N-DL-166 | Azim Khan Tomb | Lado Sarai, across Mehrauli Archaeological Park | Delhi-Gurgaon Road | Delhi | 28°31′18″N 77°11′26″E | Azim Khan Tomb More images |
| N-DL-167 | Mazar of Sheikh Mohammad Ibrahim Zauq | ChindBagh,Kadam Sharif, Paharganj, Delhi | Chinyot Basti | Delhi | 28°38′54″N 77°12′50″E | Mazar of Sheikh Mohammad Ibrahim Zauq More images |
| N-DL-168 | Fortification Wall Asad Burj, Water gate, Delhi Gate, Lahori Gate, Jahangiri Gate, Chhatta Bazar, Baoli | Red Fort, Delhi | | Delhi | | Fortification Wall Asad Burj, Water gate, Delhi Gate, Lahori Gate, Jahangiri Gate, Chhatta Bazar, Baoli |
| N-DL-169 | Fortification walls, Gates, Bastions and Ancient Buildings of Salimgarh Fort | | Bela Road | Delhi | 28°39′38″N 77°14′37″E | Fortification walls, Gates, Bastions and Ancient Buildings of Salimgarh Fort More images |
| N-DL-170 | Portion of the City Wall of Shahjahanabad | Daryaganj | Ansari Road near Kashmere Gate, Old Delhi | Delhi | 28°38′28″N 77°14′40″E | Portion of the City Wall of Shahjahanabad |
| N-DL-171 | Sat Narain Bhawan | Delhi Sadhora Khurd, Dina Nath Marg, Roshanara Road, New Delhi. | | Delhi | | Sat Narain Bhawan |
| N-DL-172 | Balban Khan's Tomb & Jamali Kamali mosque | Lado Sarai, Mehrauli, Delhi | Mehrauli Archaeological Park Trail near Anuvrat Marg | Delhi | 28°31′11″N 77°11′19″E | Balban Khan's Tomb & Jamali Kamali mosque |
| N-DL-173 | Unknown Tomb in the vicinity of Jawaharlal Nehru Stadium | Pragati Vihar, New Delhi | | Delhi | | Unknown Tomb in the vicinity of Jawaharlal Nehru Stadium |
| N-DL-174 | Mazar (tomb) of Mirza Ghalib | Nizamuddin West | Near Chausath Khamba | Delhi | 28°35′29″N 77°14′35″E | Mazar (tomb) of Mirza Ghalib |

== See also ==
- List of Monuments of National Importance in India for other Monuments of National Importance in India
- List of State Protected Monuments in Delhi
