= Rang Mahal =

Rang Mahal (lit. 'Colour Palace') may refer to:

- Rang Mahal, Sri Ganganagar, a collection of Kushan-era archaeological cultural sites of India
- Rang Mahal (Red Fort) or Palace of Colour, located in the Red Fort at Delhi in India
- Rangmahal, a village in North Guwahati, Kamrup rural district of Assam state in India
- Rang Mahal (TV series), a 2021 Pakistani romantic drama serial
