= List of State Protected Monuments in Delhi =

This is a list of New Delhi State Protected Monuments as officially reported by and available through the website of the government of NCT Delhi. The monument identifier is a combination of the abbreviation of the subdivision of the list (state, ASI circle) and the numbering as published on the website of the ASI. The Delhi government has recognized 33 State Protected Monuments till date - the number is expected to rise until 92. Besides the State Protected Monuments, also the Monuments of National Importance in this state might be relevant.

See also:

- List of State Protected Monuments in India for other State Protected Monuments in India
- List of Monuments of National Importance in Delhi

SL. No.	Description	Location	Address	District	Coordinates	Image
S-DL-1	Tomb of Muhammad Quli Khan	Mehrauli	Ladha Sarai, Archaeological Park			Tomb of Muhammad Quli Khan
S-DL-2	Horse Stable	Mehrauli	Ladha Sarai, Archaeological Park			Upload Photo
S-DL-3	Mosque	Mehrauli	Ladha Sarai, Archaeological Park			Upload Photo
S-DL-4	Tomb	Mehrauli	Ladha Sarai, Archaeological Park			Tomb
S-DL-5	Tomb	Mehrauli	Ladha Sarai, Archaeological Park			Tomb
S-DL-6	Mosque	Mehrauli	Ladha Sarai, Archaeological Park			Upload Photo
S-DL-7	Tomb	Mehrauli	Ladha Sarai, Archaeological Park			Upload Photo
S-DL-8	Tomb	Mehrauli	Ladha Sarai, Archaeological Park			Upload Photo
S-DL-9	Enclosure	Mehrauli	Ladha Sarai, Archaeological Park			Enclosure
S-DL-10	Baghichi ki Masjid, Ladha Sarai	Mehrauli	Ladha Sarai			Upload Photo
S-DL-11	Chaumachi Khan’s Tomb	Mehrauli				Upload Photo
S-DL-12	Tomb		Lado Sarai, DDA Park			Upload Photo
S-DL-13	Mosque	Lado Sarai Village				Upload Photo
S-DL-14	Tomb	Lado Sarai Village				Upload Photo
S-DL-15	Haji Langa's Tomb	RK Puram				Upload Photo
S-DL-16	Domed building	RK Puram	Sector IV			Domed building
S-DL-17	Tomb of Shaikh Ziyauddin					Upload Photo
S-DL-18	Kalu Sarai near Azad Apartment;		near Azad Apartment			Upload Photo
S-DL-19	Tomb (Gumti)	Humayunpur Village				Tomb (Gumti)
S-DL-20	Baradari Mosque	Sadhna Enclave				Upload Photo
S-DL-21	Tomb	Sadhna Enclave				Upload Photo
S-DL-22	Munda Gumbad			Park Hauz Khas		Upload Photo
S-DL-23	Tomb of Shaikh Usman Saiyah	Khirki Village				Tomb of Shaikh Usman Saiyah
S-DL-24	Tomb, Greater Kailash I					Upload Photo
S-DL-25	Tomb of Sheikh Salahuddin Darwes	Sheikh Sarai Village				Upload Photo
S-DL-26	Tomb	Sheikh Sarai Village				Tomb
S-DL-27	Tomb and Majilis Khana	Sheikh Sarai Village				Upload Photo
S-DL-28	Northern Gateway	Badarpur				Upload Photo
S-DL-29	Central Gateway	Badarpur				Upload Photo
S-DL-30	Southern Gateway and enclosure remains	Badarpur				Upload Photo
S-DL-31	Kos Minar	Badarpur				Upload Photo
S-DL-32	Kos Minar, Badarpur Border (Village Tajpul)	Badarpur				Upload Photo
S-DL-33	Kos Minar	Village Kotla Mahigirim	Near Apollo Hospital			Upload Photo
