= Azim Khan's Tomb =

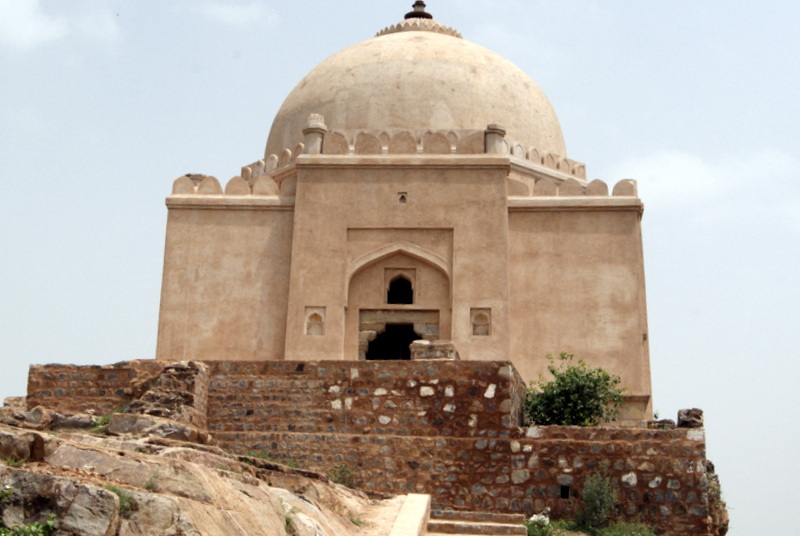

- Location of Azim Khan's Tomb in Delhi

General information
- Type: Tomb
- Architectural style: Mughal
- Location: Anuvrat Marg, Delhi-Gurgaon Road, Delhi, India
- Coordinates: 28.5218039°N 77.1904368°E
- Construction started: 17th century
- Completed: 17th century
- Renovated: 2010

Azim Khan's Tomb (aka Azim Khan) is the tomb of Azim Khan, who was a general of the Mughal Army, located on a small hillock at Anuvrat Marg, Delhi-Gurgaon Road, in Delhi, India. The tomb was commissioned in 17th century. It is built in the typical square-shaped structure with a crowned dome coated with plaster and decorated with carvings. After the Mughal period, during the British rule, the tomb was used as a recreational place by British soldiers. The tomb is included into the lists of Indian Monuments of National Importance.

== History ==
There are not enough historic records about the general Azim Khan. He was a general in the Mughal Army, was established by the empire's third emperor, Akbar. He was awarded the title "Akbar" (meaning "magnificent") by Akbar himself.

== Gallery ==
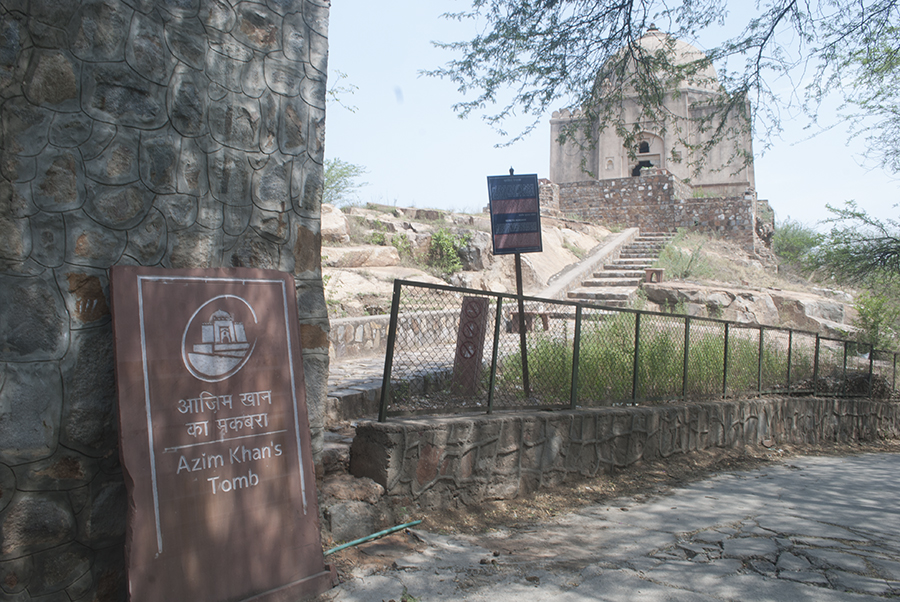
Entrance

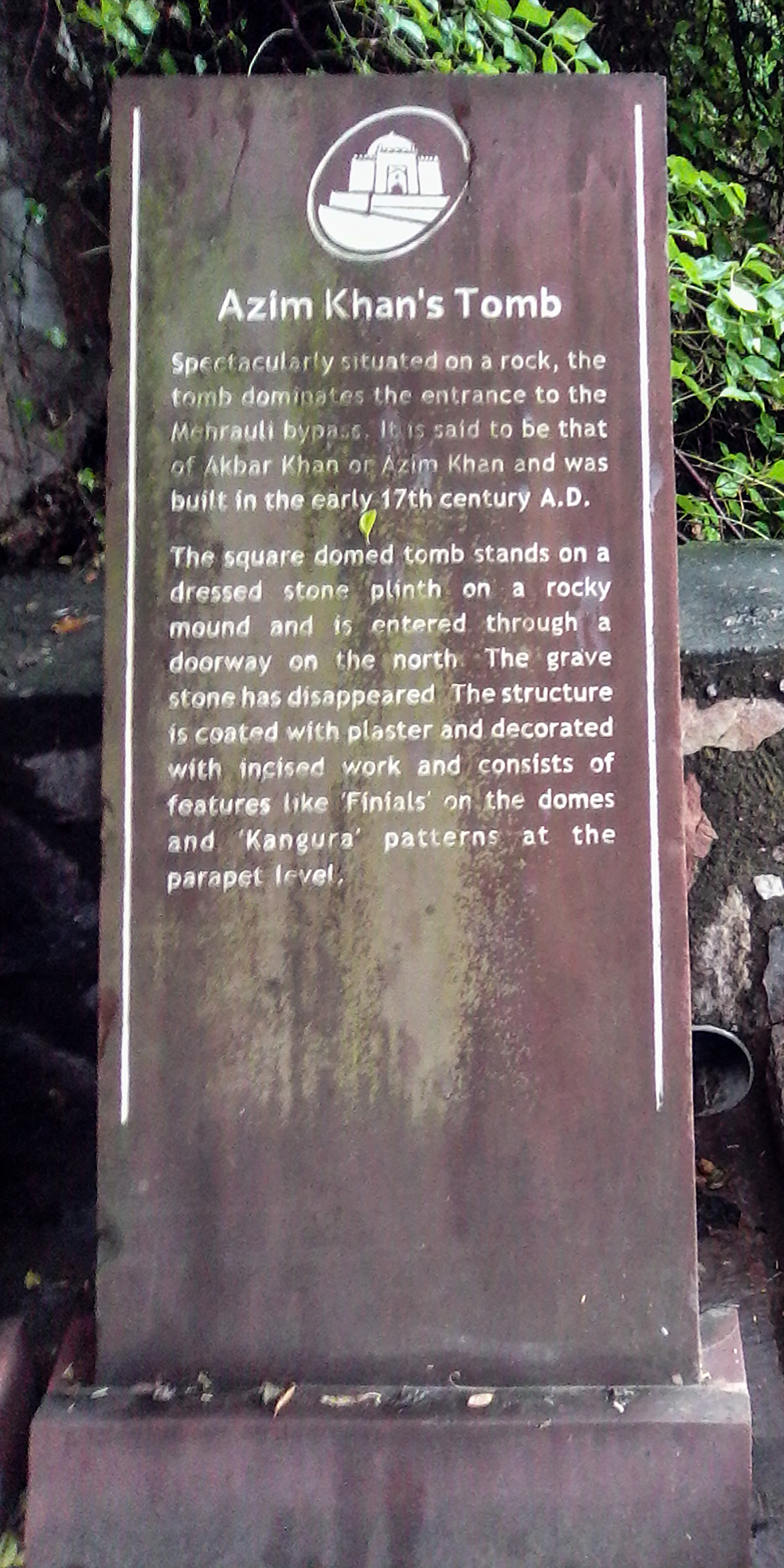
Sandstone plaque of the Azim Khan's Tomb

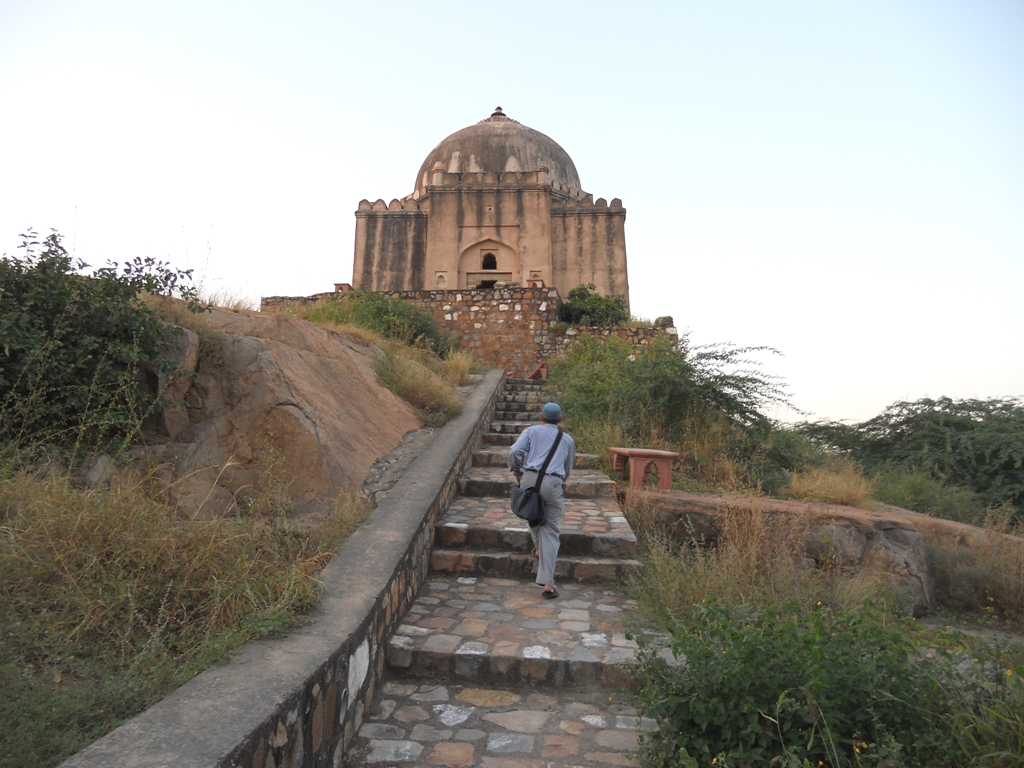
