= Qudsia Bagh =

Mughal garden and palace, Old Delhi, India

Coordinates: 28.670901°N 77.229032°E

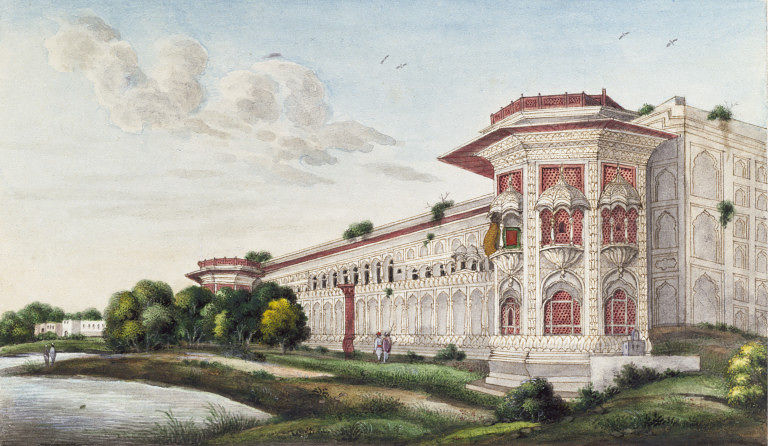
A drawing of Qudsia Palace on the banks of the River Yamuna, circa 1836

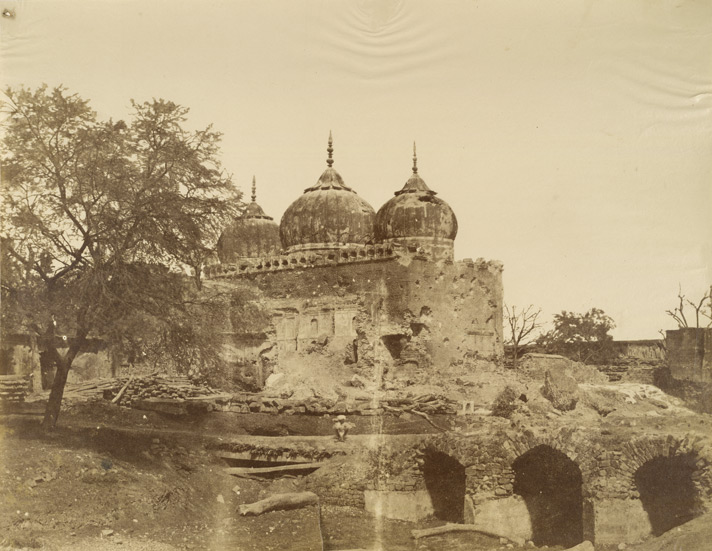
The heavily damaged Shahi Mosque of the Qudsia Palace after the 1857 Rebellion

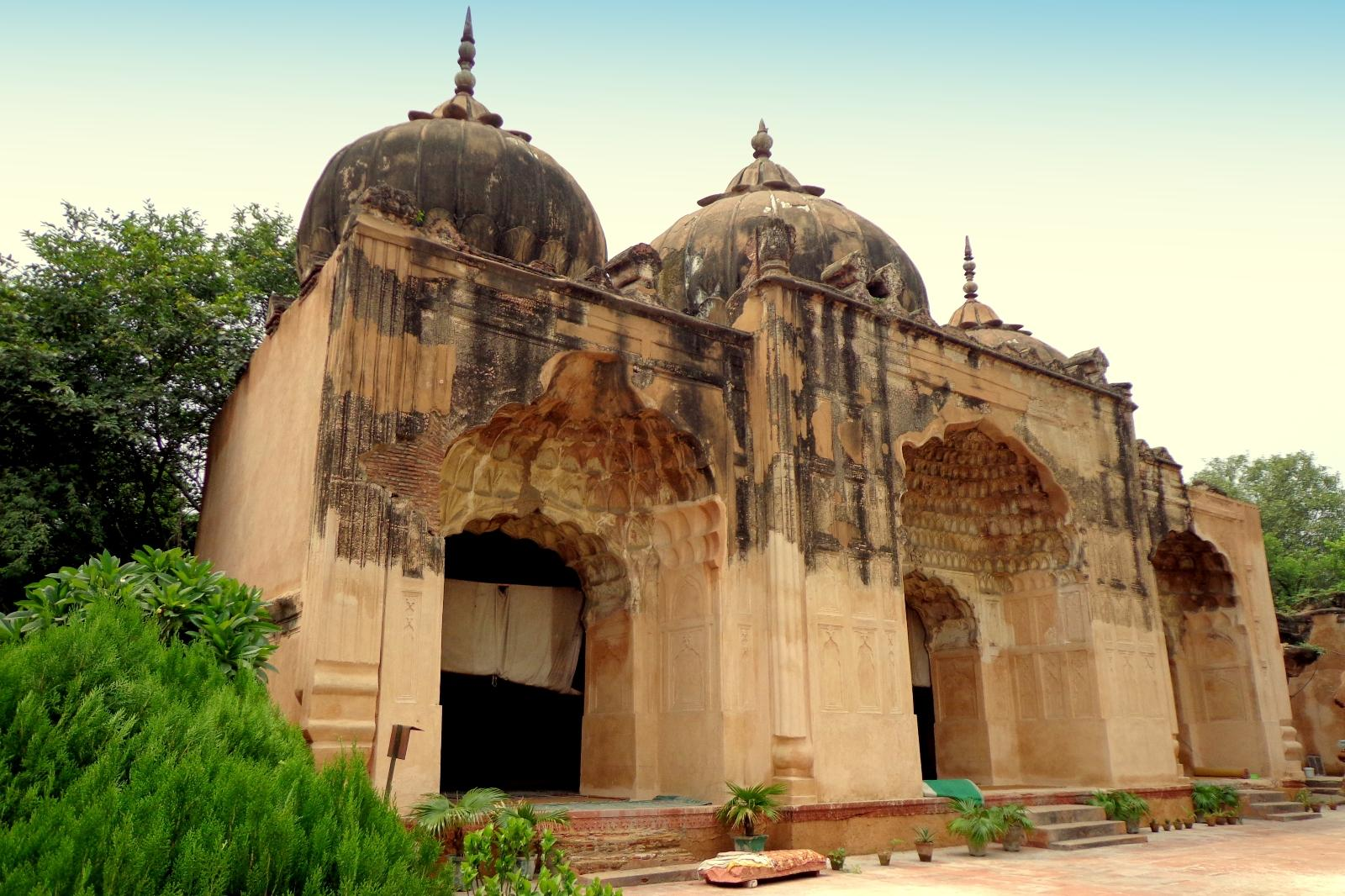
The Shahi mosque in 2012

Qudsia Bagh (English: Qudsia Garden) is an 18th-century Mughal garden complex and palace located in Civil Lines, Delhi, just outside the Walled City of Old Delhi, India.

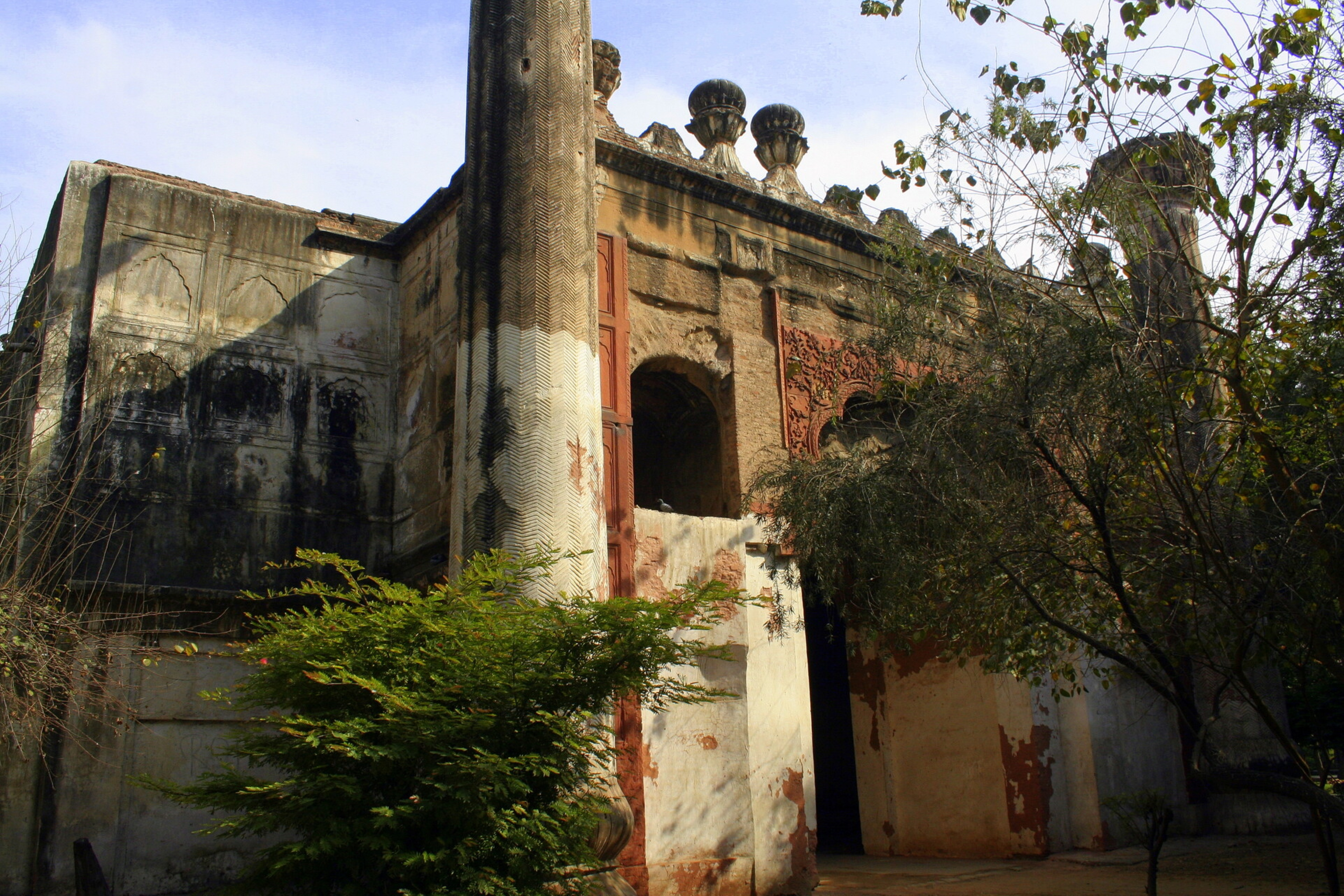
Gateway Qudasia. Bagh

== History ==
The complex was constructed in 1748 for Qudsia Begum, the mother of Mughal emperor Ahmad Shah Bahadur. It is situated north of the old city of Delhi. Formerly a splendid palace, it constituted a possession of the heir apparent before falling into disrepair and obscurity. Large parts of it were destroyed during the Indian Rebellion of 1857.

Today, only an entrance gate, the Shahi (Emperor's) mosque, and the stables remain. Historian Hasan Zafar notes that the garden has been recorded as a protected monument in the Archaeological Survey of India records.

== See also ==
- Sunehri Masjid (Golden Mosque)
- Lal Bangla are two imperial late-Mughal mausoleums located in New Delhi, in Delhi, India, that are under the custodianship of the Archaeological Survey of India.
- Khairul Manazil or Khair-ul-Manazil (lit. 'the most auspicious of houses') is a historical mosque built in 1561 in New Delhi, India.
