= Khairul Manazil =

Mosque and madrassa in Delhi, India

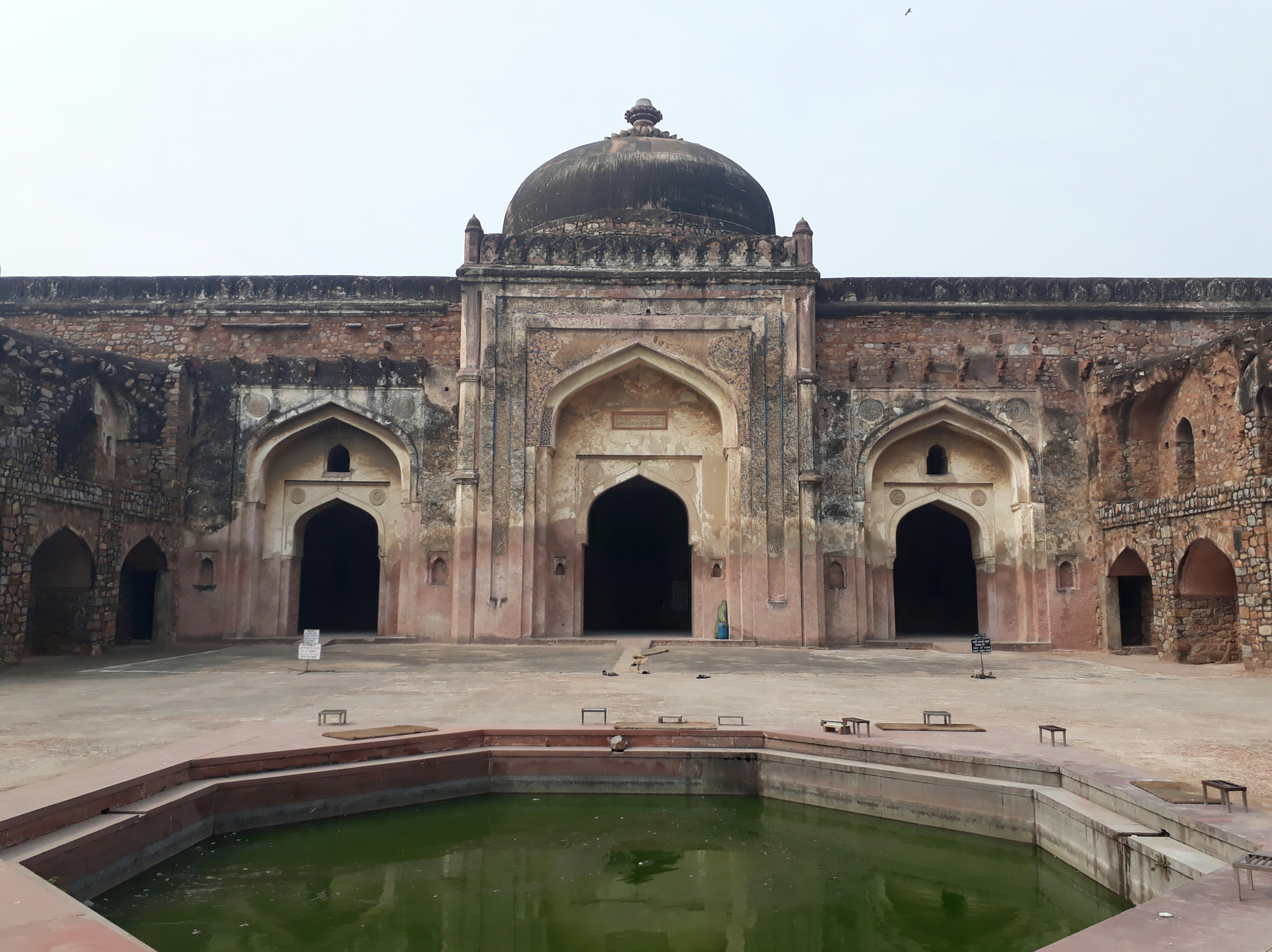
- The mosque in 2017

- Location of the mosque in Central Delhi

Religion
- Affiliation: Islam
- Ecclesiastical or organisational status: Mosque and madrassa
- Status: Active

Location
- Location: Mathura Road, Central Delhi, Delhi NCT
- Country: India
- Administration: Archaeological Survey of India
- Coordinates: 28°36′27″N 77°14′22″E

Architecture
- Type: Mosque architecture
- Style: Mughal
- Founder: Maham Anga
- Completed: 969 AH (1561/1562 CE)

Specifications
- Dome: One (maybe more)
- Inscriptions: One (maybe more)
- Materials: Red sandstone

Monument of National Importance
- Official name: Khair-ul-Manzil
- Reference no.: N-DL-5

The Khairul Manazil or Khair-ul-Manazil (lit. 'the most auspicious of houses') is a historical mosque and madrasa built in 1561 in New Delhi, India. The mosque is located opposite Purana Qila on Mathura Road, southeast of Sher Shah Gate. The mosque's gateway is constructed of red sandstone, following the Mughal architectural style, while the interior structure reflects the foibles of the Delhi Sultanate architecture.

The mosque is a Monument of National Importance, administered and maintained by the Archaeological Survey of India.

== History ==
This structure was built by one of the most influential and powerful women in Akbar's court, Maham Anga, who was the Emperor's wet nurse and foster mother. It is said that in 1564, Akbar was attacked near the mosque by an assassin while returning from the Nizamuddin Dargah. Later, the building was used as a madrasa.

== Epigraph ==
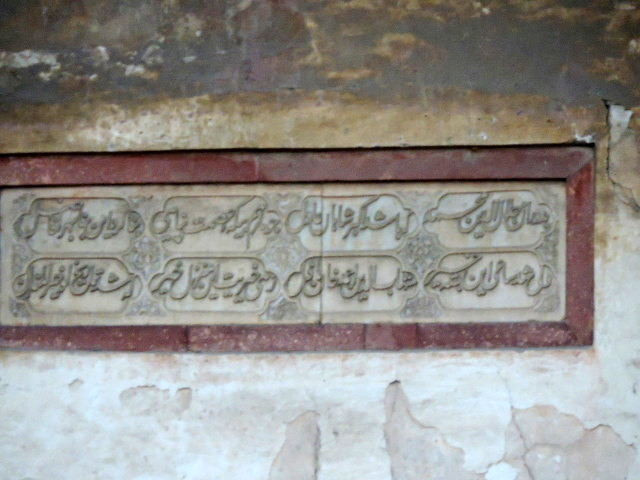
Part of the inscription

The Persian epigraphy carved on the marble plaque above the arch of the central gate is a chronogram written by Emperor Akbar's court historian and poet, Maulana Shihabuddin Ahmad Khan (pen name: Baazil). He is also credited with composing the eulogy on the tombstone of Amir Khusrau at the Hazrat Nizamuddin Dargah, some two hundred and ten years after Khusrau's death.

The Arabic letters forming the words Khair ul Manazil are translated into their numerical equivalents using the rule of ٲٻڄݚ, which sums up to the numerals of 969 AH (1561/1562 CE).

Arabic: کتبہ ٕ تاریخ خیرالمنازل مسجد دہلی
بدورانِ جلالالدّین مُحمّد
کہ او شُد اکبرِ شاہانِ عادِل
چو ماہم بیگمِ عِصمت پناہی
بِنا کرد این بِنا بہرِ افاضِل
ولے شُد ساعی ٕاین لمعہ ٕخیر
شِہاب الدّین احمد خان 'باذِل'
زہی خیریّتِ این منزِلِ خیر
کہ شُد تاریخ او خیر المنازِل
سنہٕ ٩٦٩ ھجری

Transliteration:

BADAURAAN E JALAALUDDIN MUHAMMAD
KEH OU SHUD AKBAR E SHAAHAAN AADIL
CHU MAAHAM BEGUM E ISMAT PANAAHEY
BINAA KARD EIN BINAA BAHR E AFAAZIL
WALEY SHUD SAAYI E EIN LAM'A E KHAIR
SHIHAABUDDIN AHMAD KHAN 'BAAZIL'
ZAHEY KHAIRIYYAT E EIN MANZIL E KHAIR
KEH SHUD TAAREEKH E OU 'KHAIR UL MANAAZIL'

Translation:

During the reign of Jalaluddin Muhammad
The one who became the greatest of the Mughal emperors.
When Maham Begam the most exalted among chaste noblewomen
Ordered the making of this monument for public benefit.
And thus this event of goodness came to be recorded
By Shihabuddin Ahmad Khan 'Baazil' (Note: pen name, meaning storyteller.)
Felicitated be this monument and its makers
And thus it came to be called the abode of goodness.

== See also ==
- Islam in India
- List of mosques in India
- List of Monuments of National Importance in Delhi
