= Mutiny Memorial =

Military memorial in India

Coordinates: 28°40′16″N 77°12′38″E

The Mutiny Memorial in Jan 2019

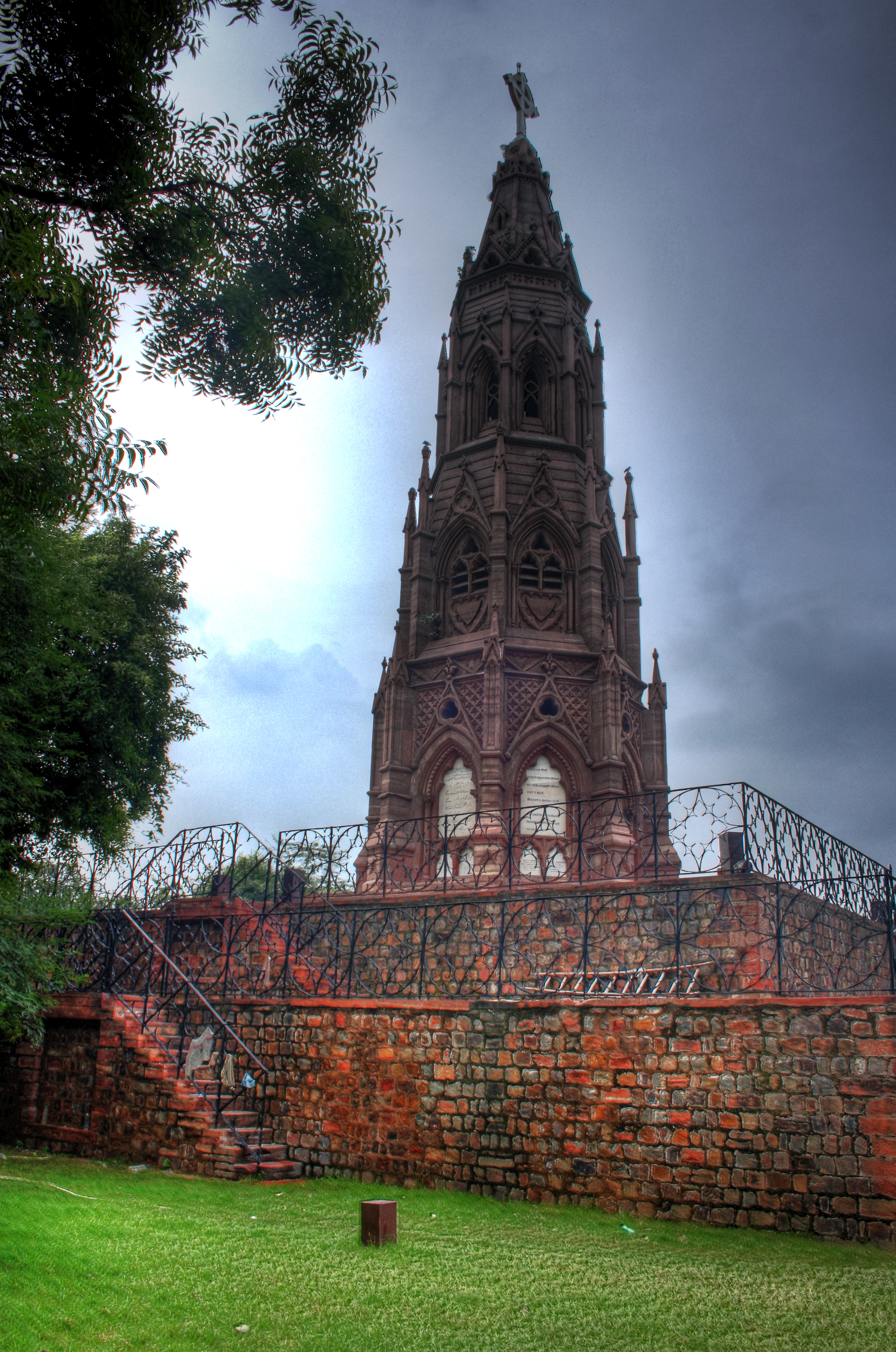
Mutiny Memorial in 2012

The Mutiny Memorial, now known as Ajitgarh, is a memorial situated on the Ridge Delhi. It was built to commemorate the Delhi Field Force during the Indian Revolt of 1857 and bears the names of some of the British officers and men who were killed.

== History ==
Erected by the Public Works Department of the British Raj in 1863, the memorial was hastily designed and constructed. It received much public criticism on completion. In 1972, the 25th anniversary of India's independence, the Indian government renamed the monument 'Ajitgarh' ('Place of the Unvanquished') and erected a plaque stating:

The 'enemy' of the inscriptions on this monument were those who rose against colonial rule and fought bravely for national liberation in 1857, In memory of the heroism of these immortal martyrs for Indian freedom.

== Architecture ==
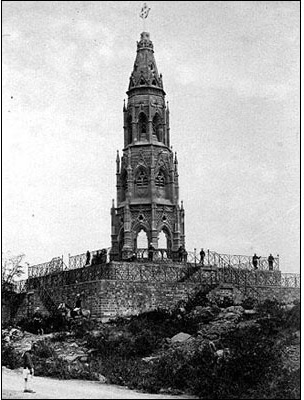
The Mutiny Memorial in 1870

The memorial was built in the Gothic style in red sandstone, with four tiers rising from an octagonal base. The lowest tier consists of seven faces containing memorial plaques and one face holding the stairs to the upper tiers.

The memorial was built to be just taller than the Ashoka Pillar, which is situated 200 metres (660 ft) away.

== Location ==
The Mutiny Memorial is located in front of Old Telegraph Building, Kashmiri Gate. You can enter into the memorial by the entrance gate opposite to Bara Hindu Rao Hospital, near to Delhi University campus in Civil Lines, Delhi.
