= Humayunpur =

Neighborhood of Delhi, India

Coordinates: 28.5610°N 77.1940°E

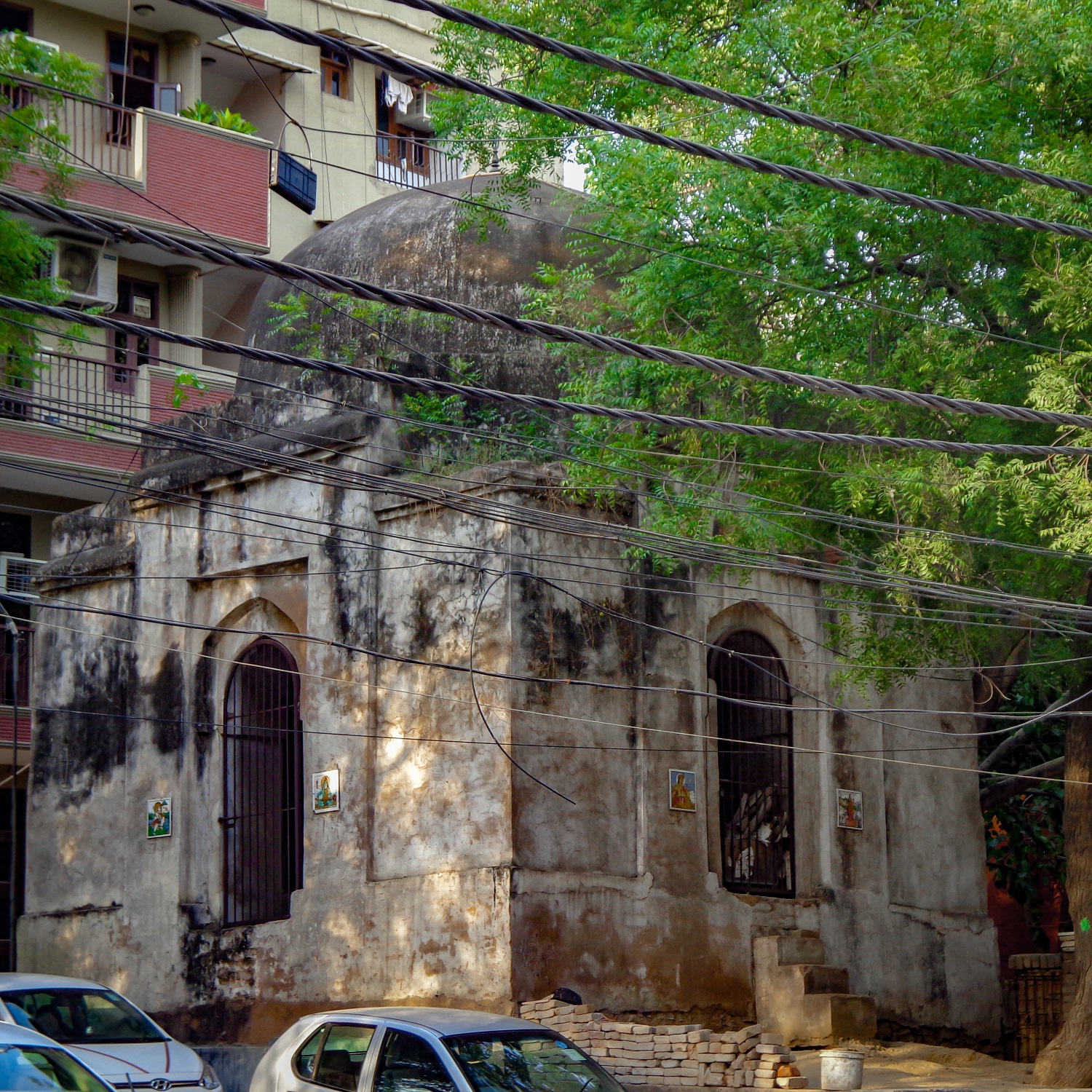
A gumti, an historic monument in Humayunpur

Humayunpur (Hindi: हुमायूंपुर) is a neighborhood located in the South Delhi District of the Indian state of Delhi. It is part of Safdarjung Enclave, and has a substantial Jat population. The settlement has existed since its origins as a village in the 17th century known as Hanumanpur.

The area is known for its restaurants. It is a popular area for migrants to Delhi from other parts of India.

Deer Park lies to the south.
