= Arab Serai =

16th century caravanserai in Delhi, India

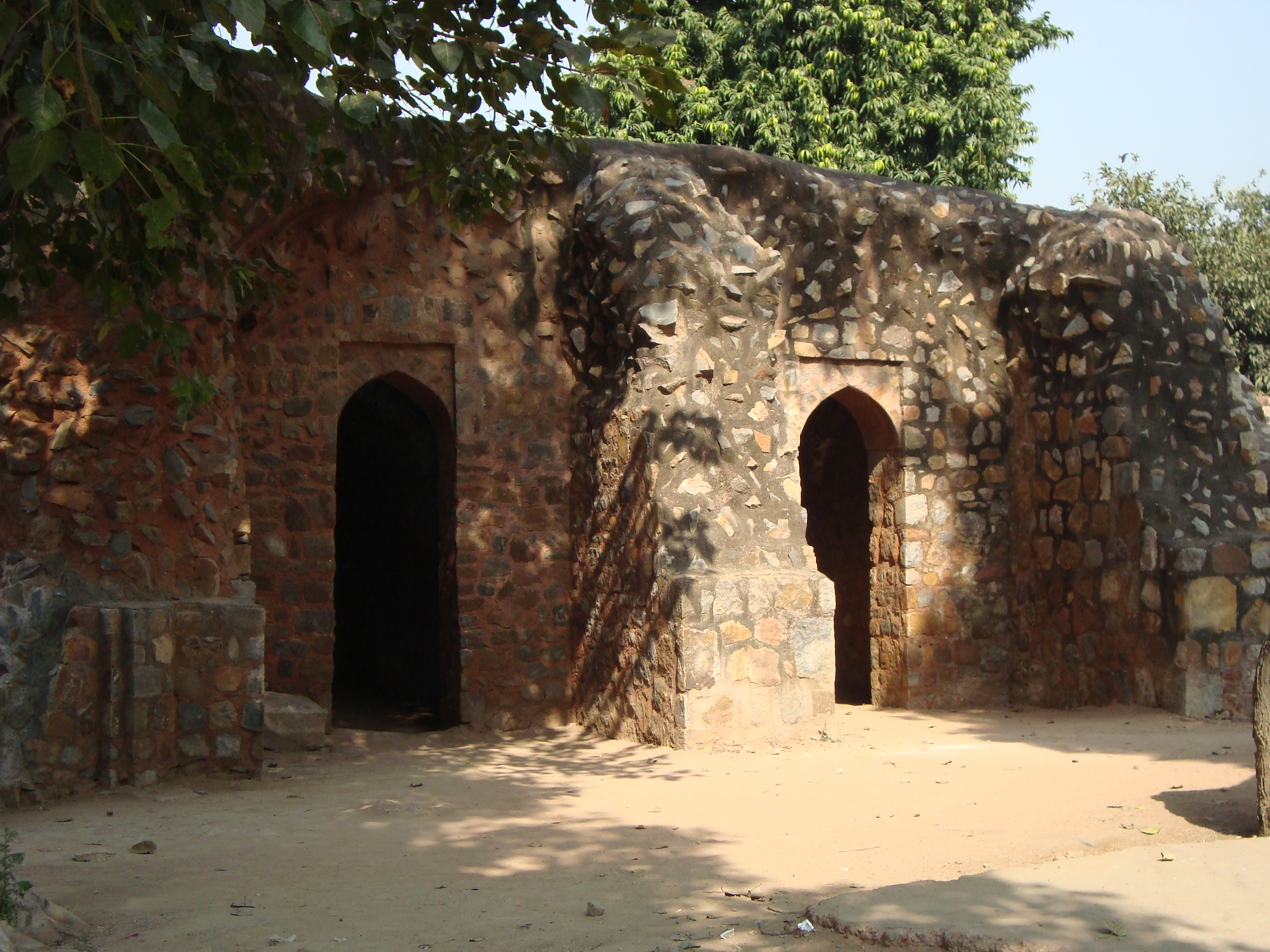
- Inside the Arab Serai
- Interactive map of Arab Serai
- 28°35′29″N 77°14′54″E
- Location: Humayun's tomb, Delhi

UNESCO World Heritage Site
- Type: Cultural
- Criteria: (ii), (iv)
- Designated: 1993 (17th session)
- Part of: Humayun's Tomb
- Region: India

Arab Serai is a 16th century caravanserai within the Humayun's tomb complex at Delhi, India. It is said to have been built by Mughal emperor Humayun's widow Haji Begum. In recent times, it has been conserved by Aga Khan Trust for Culture.

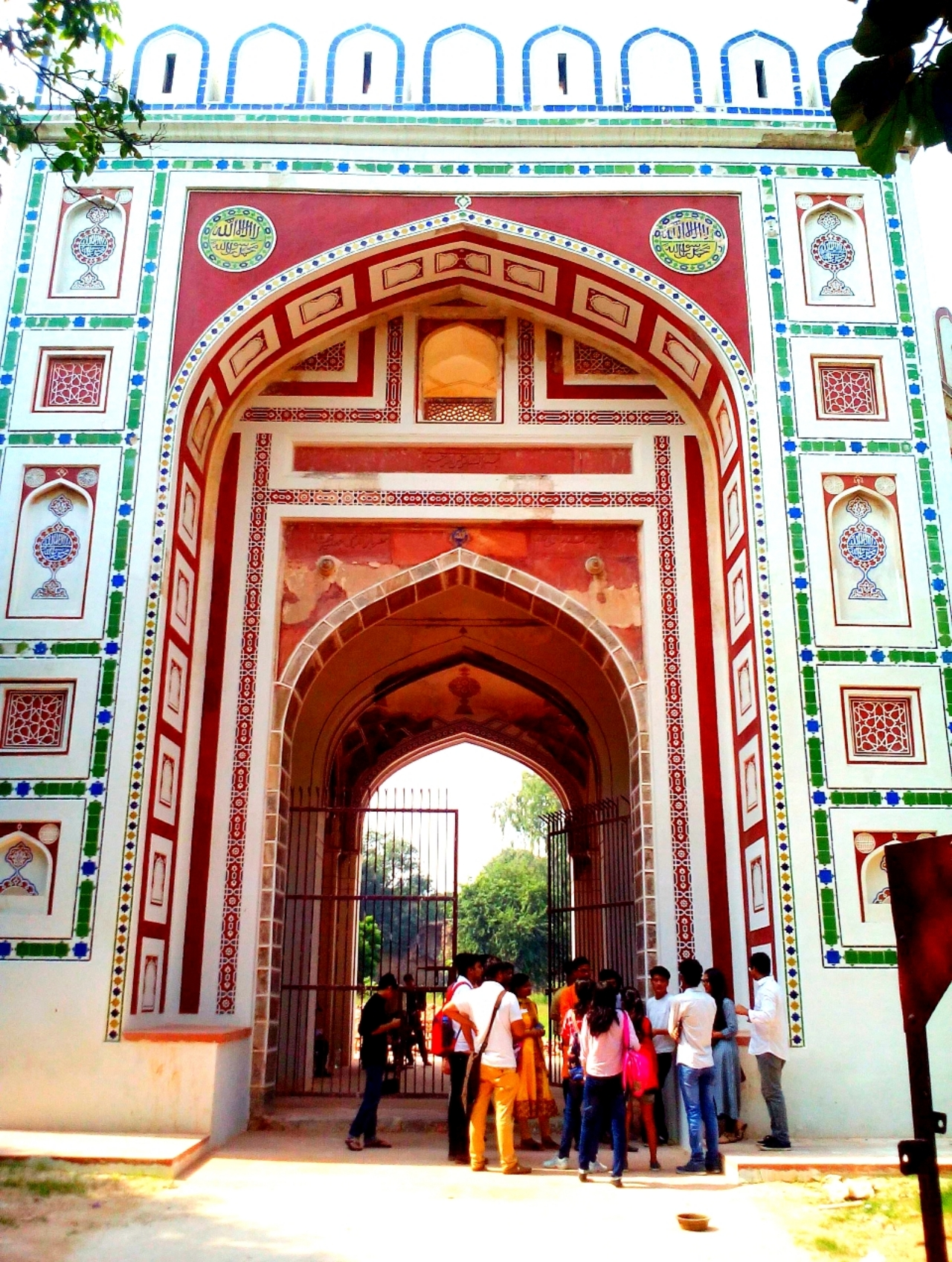
East Gate Arab Ki Sarai

== History ==
According to S.A.A. Naqvi, the Mughal emperor Humayun's widow Haji Begum, built this serai in 1560 to shelter three hundred Arab mullahs whom she was taking with her during her Hajj to Mecca. On her return, she brought with her around 300 Hadhrami Sayyids, sheikhs, and attendants to India as royal guests. They were invited to recite the Qur’an at the Tomb of Emperor Humayun. This marked the establishment of the Arab Ki Sarai, a lodge in Delhi constructed by Haji Begum to host the Hadhrami visitors. A modern guide to New Delhi notes its location near Humayun’s tomb and describes its gateway leading to a walled enclosure.

In January 2017, the Aga Khan Trust for Culture started a project to conserve the serai. The restoration was completed in November 2018. In March 2019, the trust announced a planned project to conserve the baoli (stepwell) of the serai with the help of funds from the embassy of Germany. This building along with other buildings form the UNESCO World Heritage Site of Humayun's Tomb complex.

=== Legacy ===
The Sarai became a center for Islamic observance in Delhi. The Mawlid, marking the Prophet’s birthday, was celebrated annually with Qur’an recitations, naats, and Sufi gatherings. Contemporary accounts describe an atmosphere of devotion, with residents known for their mastery of tajwīd. Visitors were welcomed with dates, traditional dishes, and qahwa (coffee).

== Name ==
The name Arab Ki Sarai literally translates to "Arab Palace" in Hindustani. In this case, the designation "Arab" refers to the Hadhrami Sayyids and scholars from the Arabian Peninsula who were hosted there by Haji Begum after her return from the Hajj in 1560. The compound thus served as both a residential enclave for these Arab guests and a religious space linked to Humayun’s tomb.

== Community and Lineages ==
The settlement housed several Hadhrami Sayyid families, including the Ba Faqih, Ba Hasan, Ba Taha, Jamal al-Layl, and Saqqaf lineages. Other groups included the Ba Abbud, Ba Kathir, and the Baqqan. The community maintained a strong religious identity, with Qur’an recitation and Islamic scholarship forming central aspects of daily life.

== Notable residents ==
Among its residents was Sayyid Abdullah Ba Faqih (d. 1912), who served as Mir Munshi (chief scribe) in the Punjab Hill States. During his pilgrimage to Mecca and Medina in 1872–73, he had his genealogical lineage authenticated, tracing descent from the Prophet Muhammad through Ahmad bin Isa al-Muhajir, the progenitor of the Hadrami Ba Alawi sayyids.

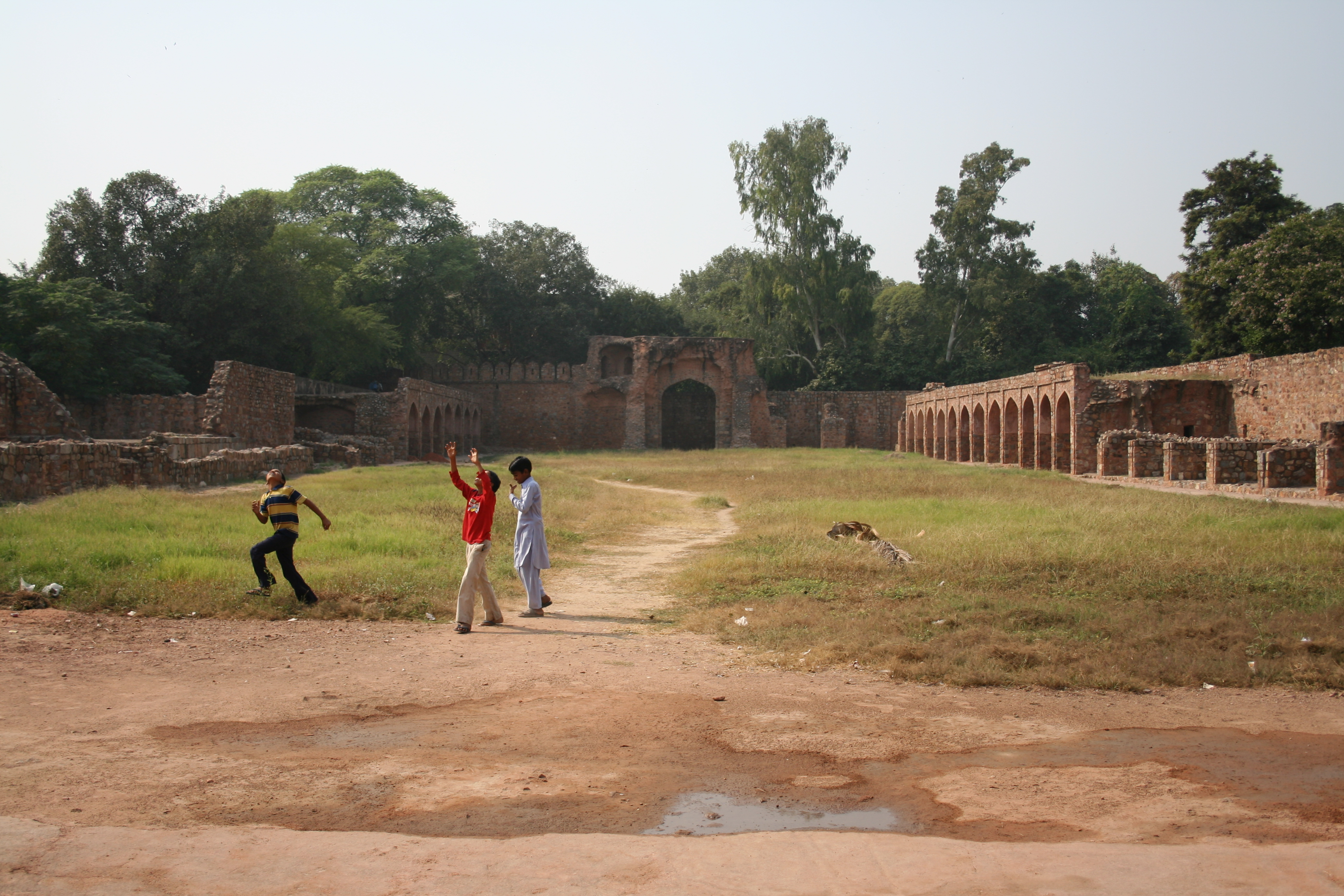
Arab Ki Sarai Abadi Area

== Architecture ==
This building contains arched cells against its enclosure walls. Presently, the cells are in ruins. The northern gate is the only structure of the building which is intact. The gate measures 12.2 metres (40 ft) in height and is made of quartzite with red sandstone and is inlaid by marble. The octagonal shaped gate chamber was crowned by a dome at the time of its construction, but since then the dome has collapsed. A balcony window is present over the arch of the main gateway and is supported by six brackets. On each side of the gateway at the same level, more balcony windows crowned by a pyramidal dome are present. The domes are covered with yellow and blue tiles.

The sarai houses two more gateways - one on the east side and another on the west. According to an inscription at the eastern gateway, the eastern gateway actually served as an entrance to a market and was built by a man named Mihr Banu during the reign of Jahangir. The market also contains arched rooms which are presently in ruins.

== Gallery ==
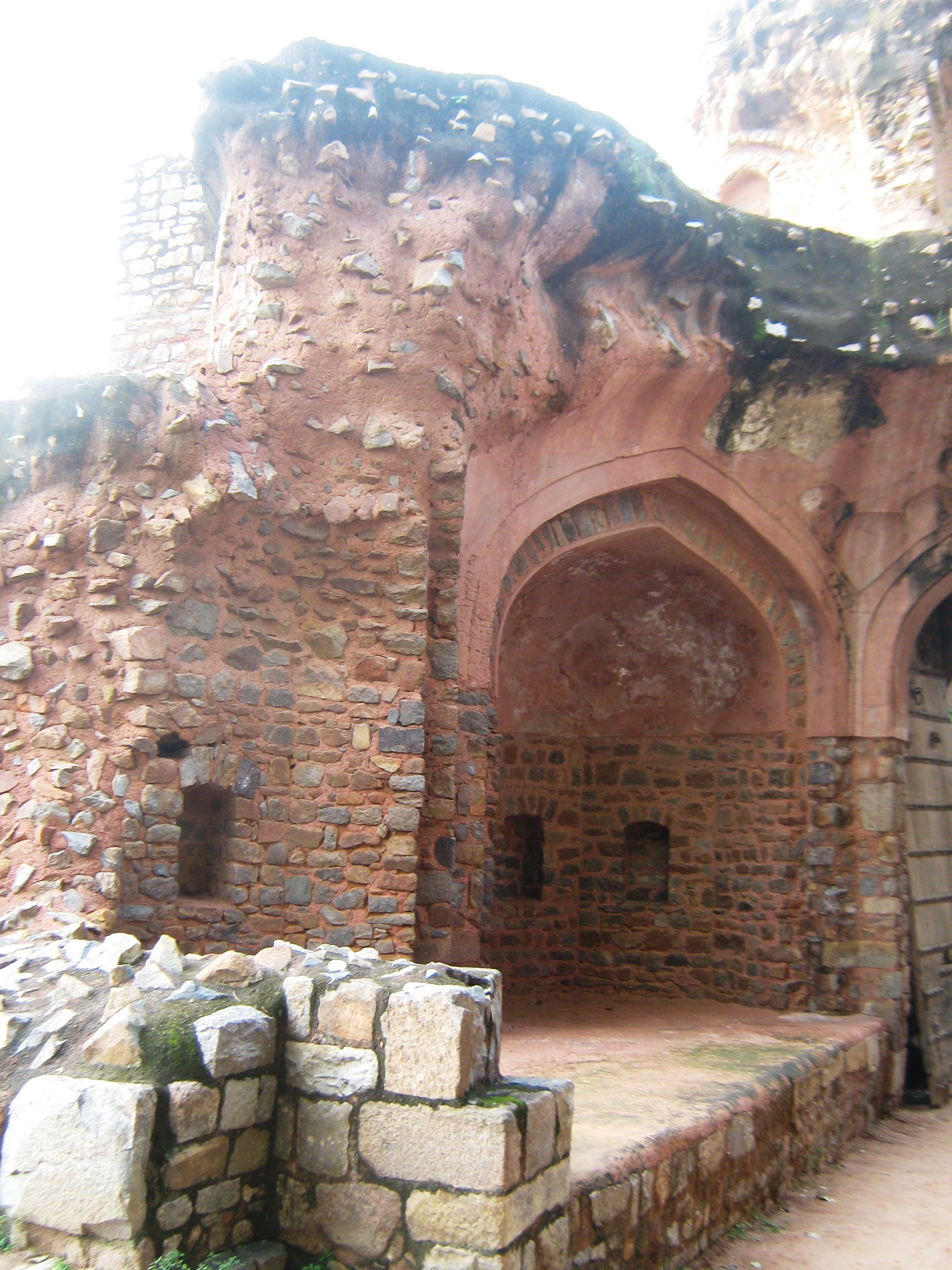
The walls of the serai

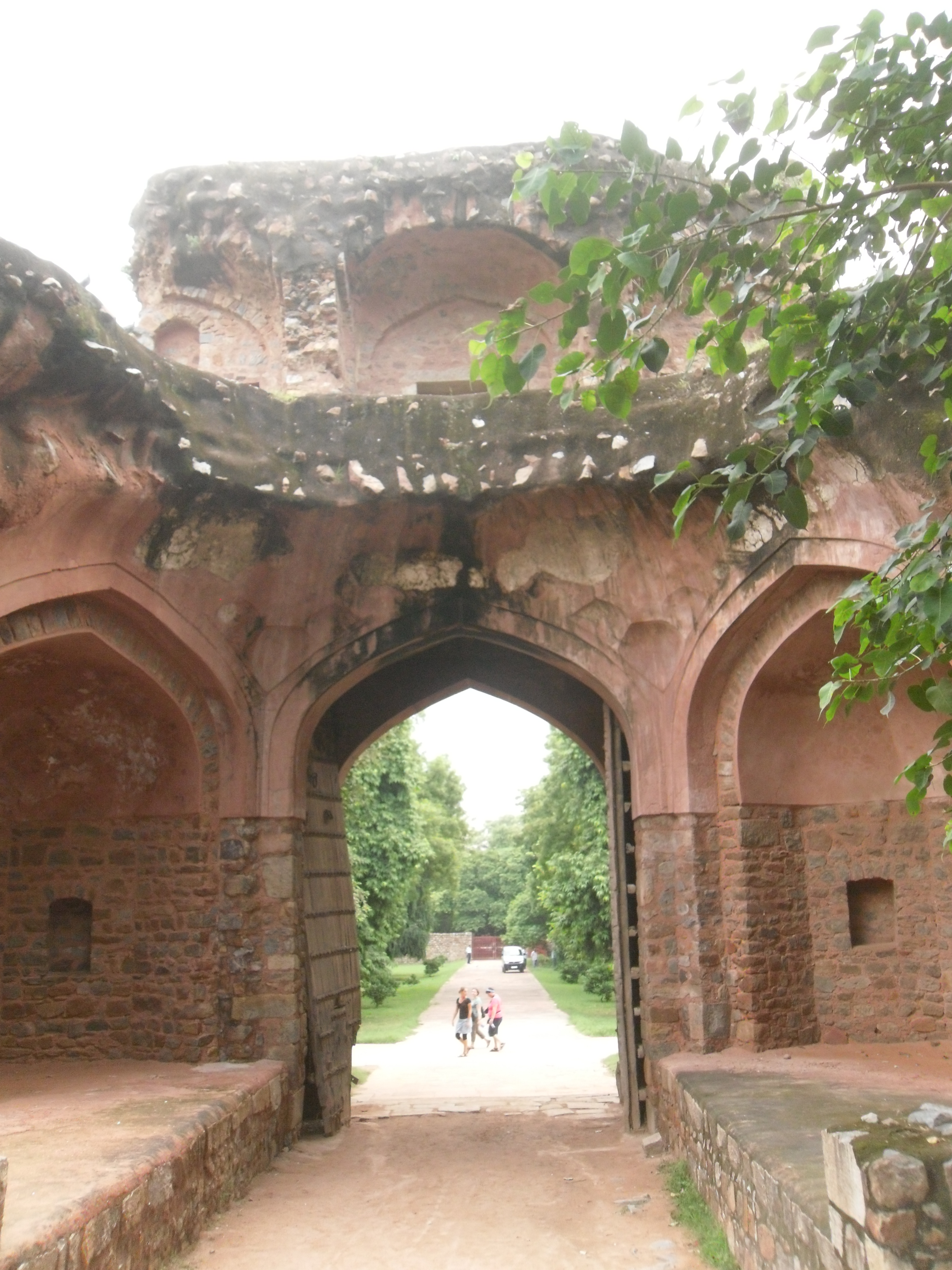
Doorway of the serai
