= Shahi Burj (Red Fort) =

Coordinates: 28.658566°N 77.243834°E

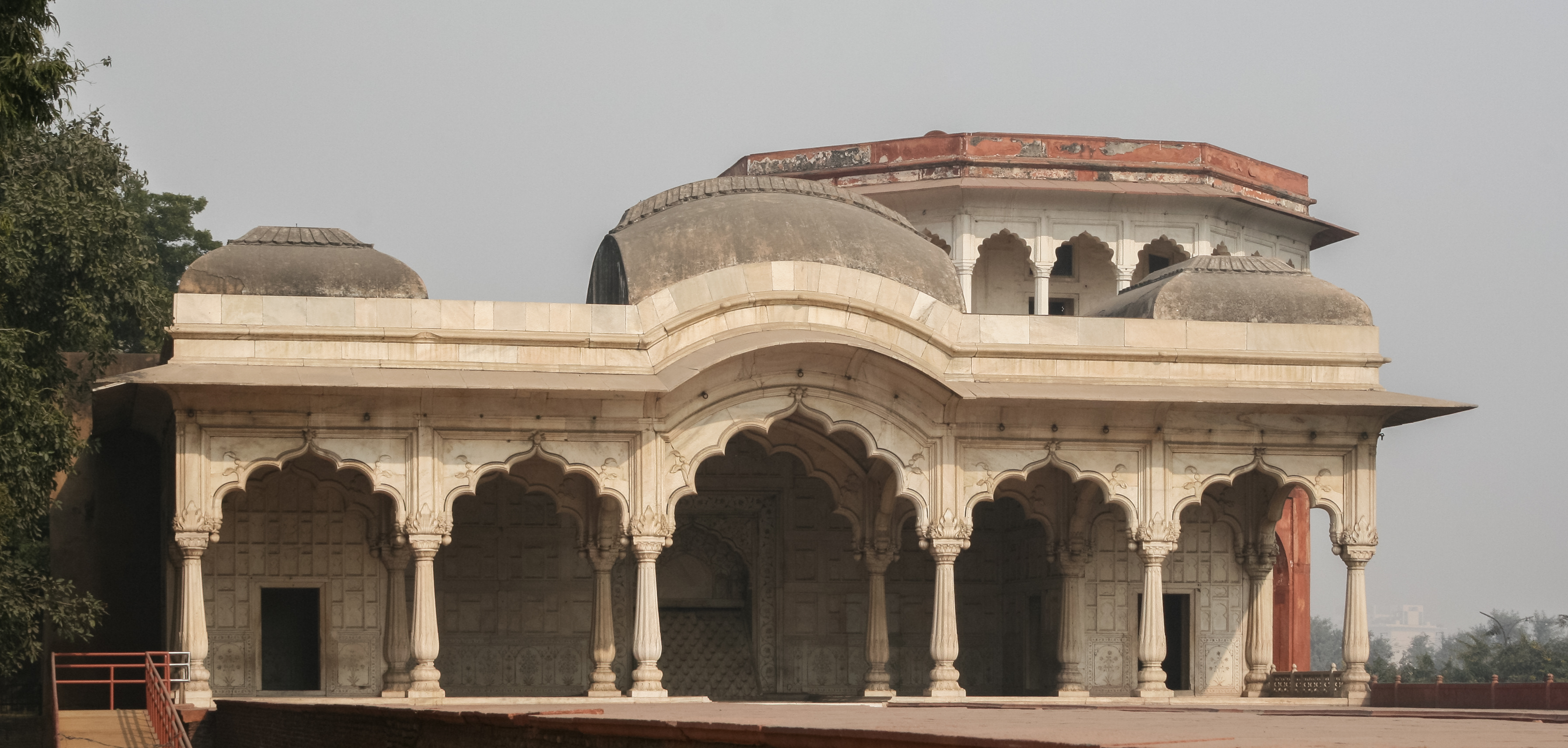
Shahi Burj and its pavilion, in the Red Fort

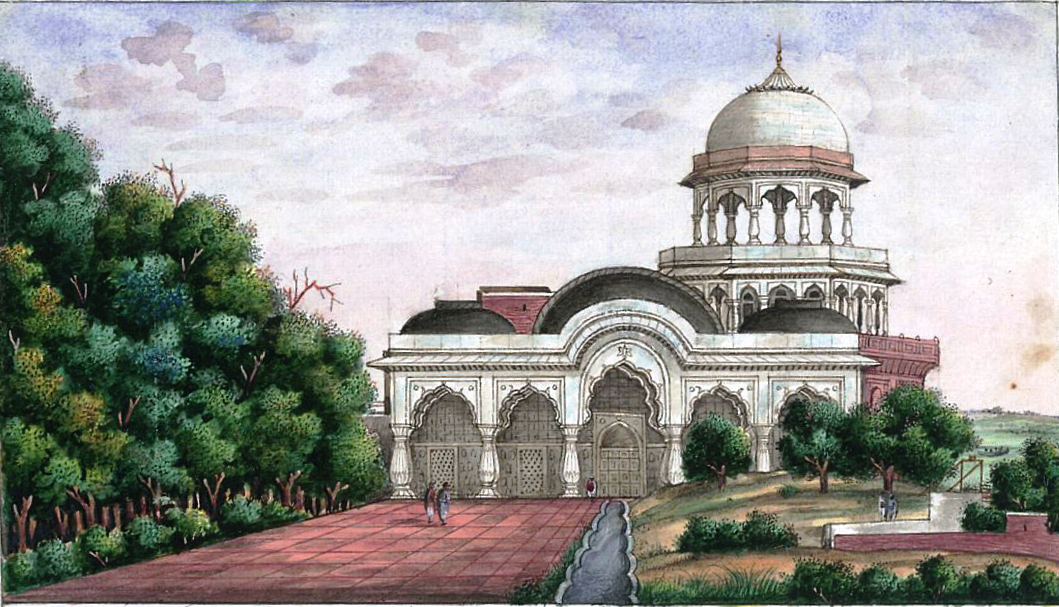
Painting of the Shahi Burj with the now missing chhatri (1843)

The Shahi Burj (Urdu: Emperor's Tower) is a three-storey octagonal tower of the Red Fort in Old Delhi.

The tower is located at the northeastern corner of the imperial enclosure. The water feeding, the Nahr-i-Bihisht, is channeled up from the river with a hydraulic system through the tower and then carried by channels into various other buildings of the fort. Adjacent to the south of the tower is a white marble pavilion that was constructed during Aurangzeb's rule. The pavilion features five arches supported on fluted columns and with low whale back roofs. In the centre of the north wall is a marble cascade sloping into a scalloped basin.

The tower was damaged during the Indian Rebellion of 1857 and again during a heavy earthquake in 1904. Originally there was a chhatri that is now missing. The tower and pavilion have been undergoing renovation work for many years and are closed to the public.

On the south-eastern corner is the Asad Burj, which is a similar tower.
