= Rang Mahal (Red Fort) =

Building in the Red Fort, Delhi, India

Coordinates: 28.655671°N 77.243544°E

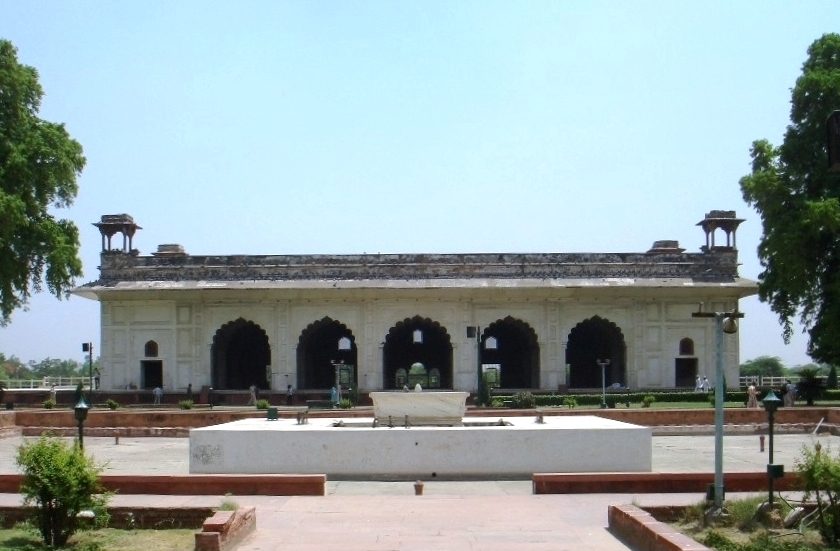
The Rang Mahal in the Red Fort (2008)

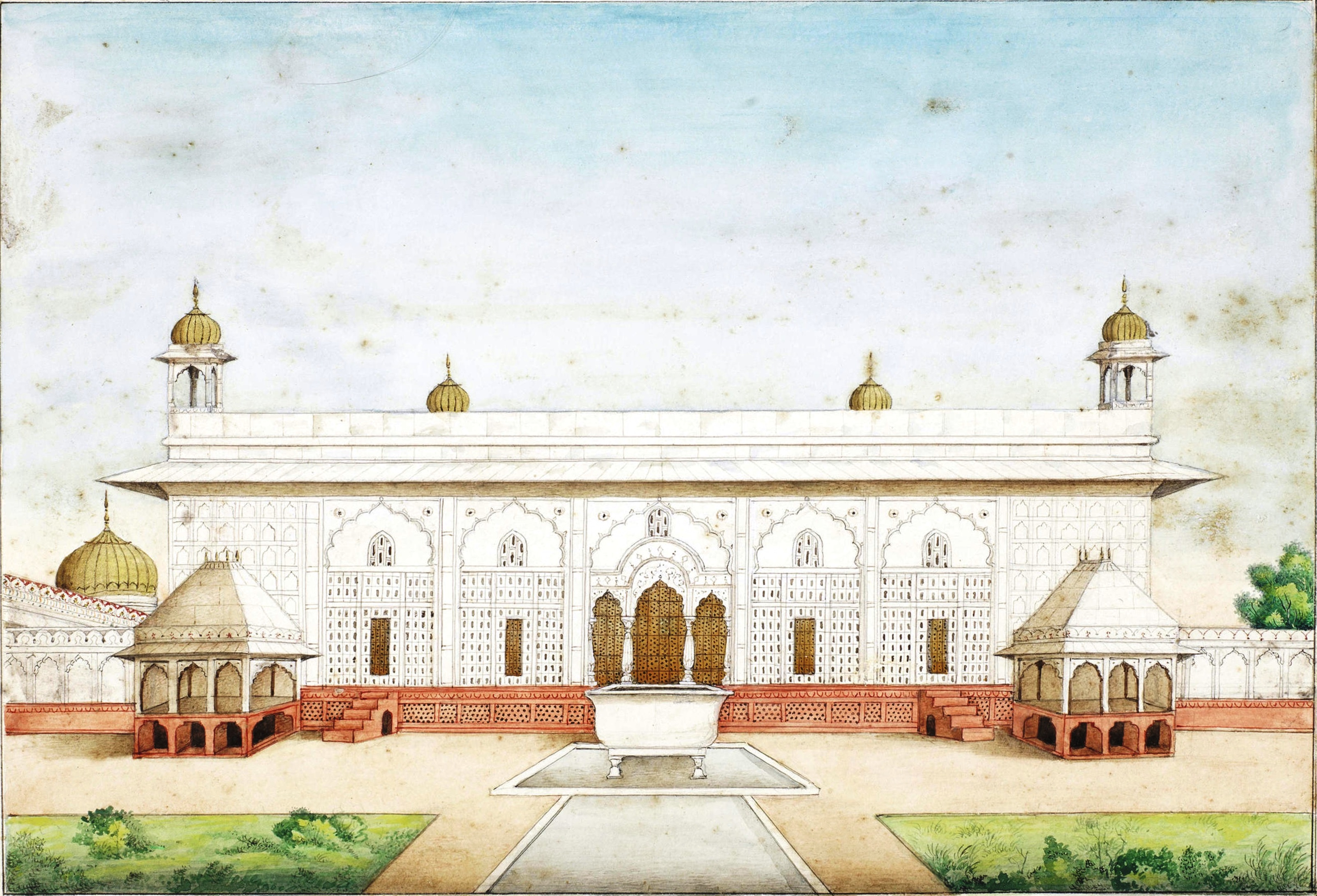
Drawing of the Rang Mahal in the early 1850s, by Ghulam Ali Khan

The Rang Mahal or Palace of Colour is located in the Red Fort, Old Delhi.

It originally served as a part of the imperial harem. It was the part of the palace in which female members of the royal family could rest at. It was known as the Palace of Distinction (Imtiaz Mahal) during the rule of Shah Jahan. After the British occupied the fort in 1857, Rang Mahal was used as a mess hall for a brief time.

The building's interior was once richly painted and decorated. Some apartments of this building are called Shish Mahal due to tiny pieces of mirrors that cover the ceilings.

Through the center of the marble palace, a shallow canal called the Stream of Paradise (Nahr-i-Bihist) flowed into a marble basin carved into the floor. Under the Rang Mahal was a basement (tehkhana), which women would use on hot summer days.

== Gallery ==
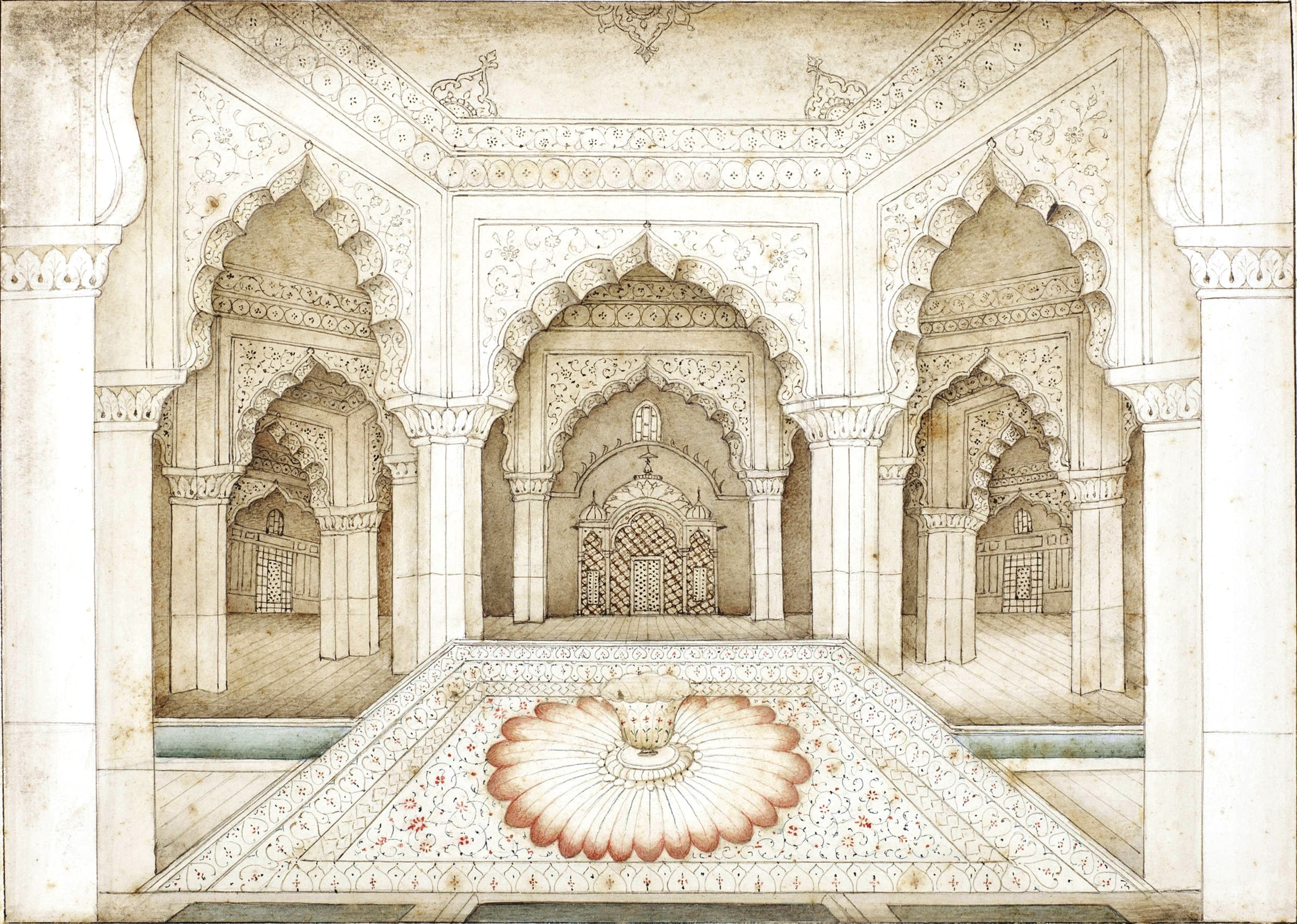
Drawing of the interior with the Stream of Paradise in the 1850s

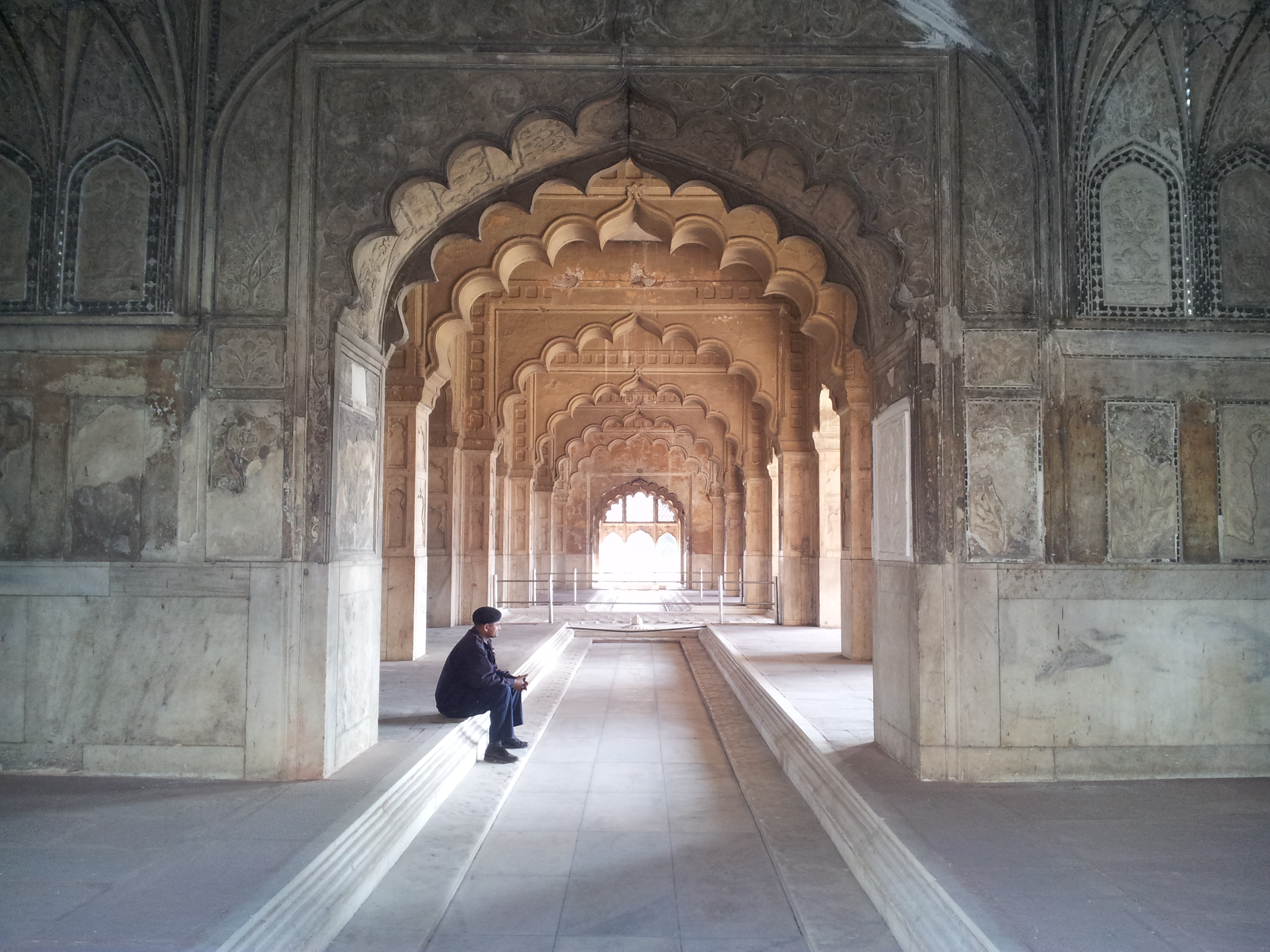
Interior with the Stream of Paradise in 2012

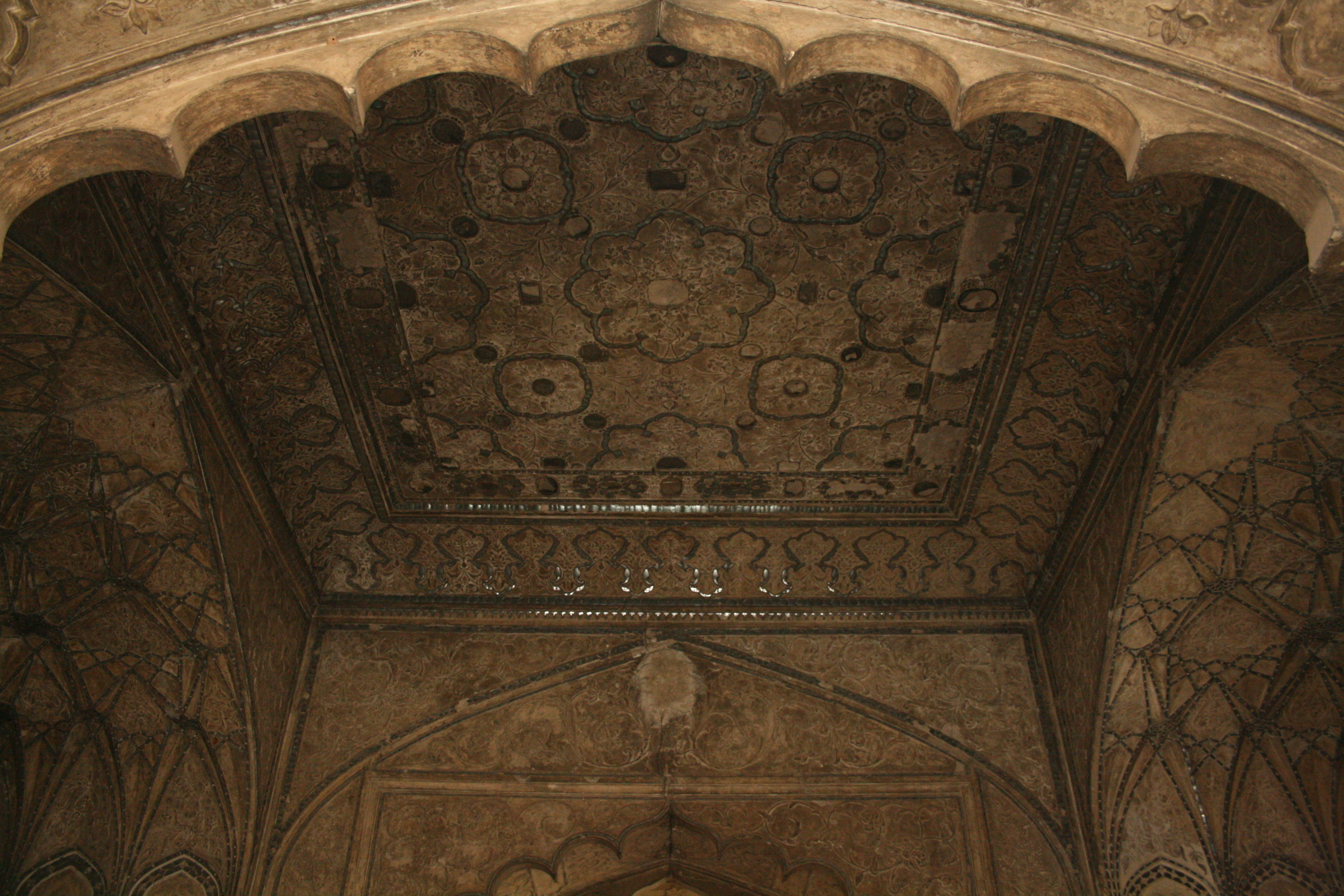
The mirrored ceiling

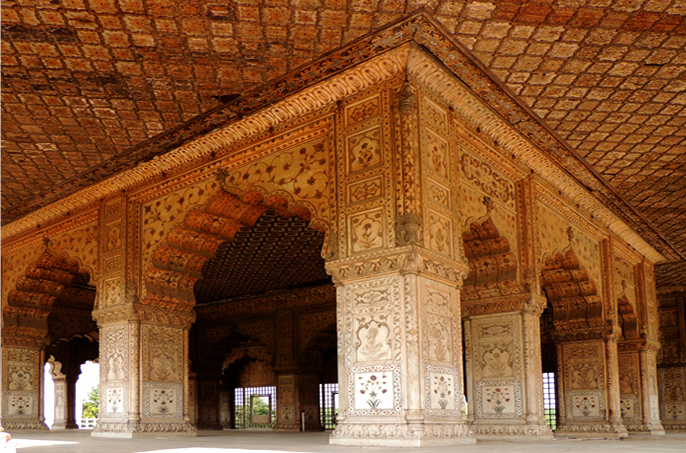
The Corner View

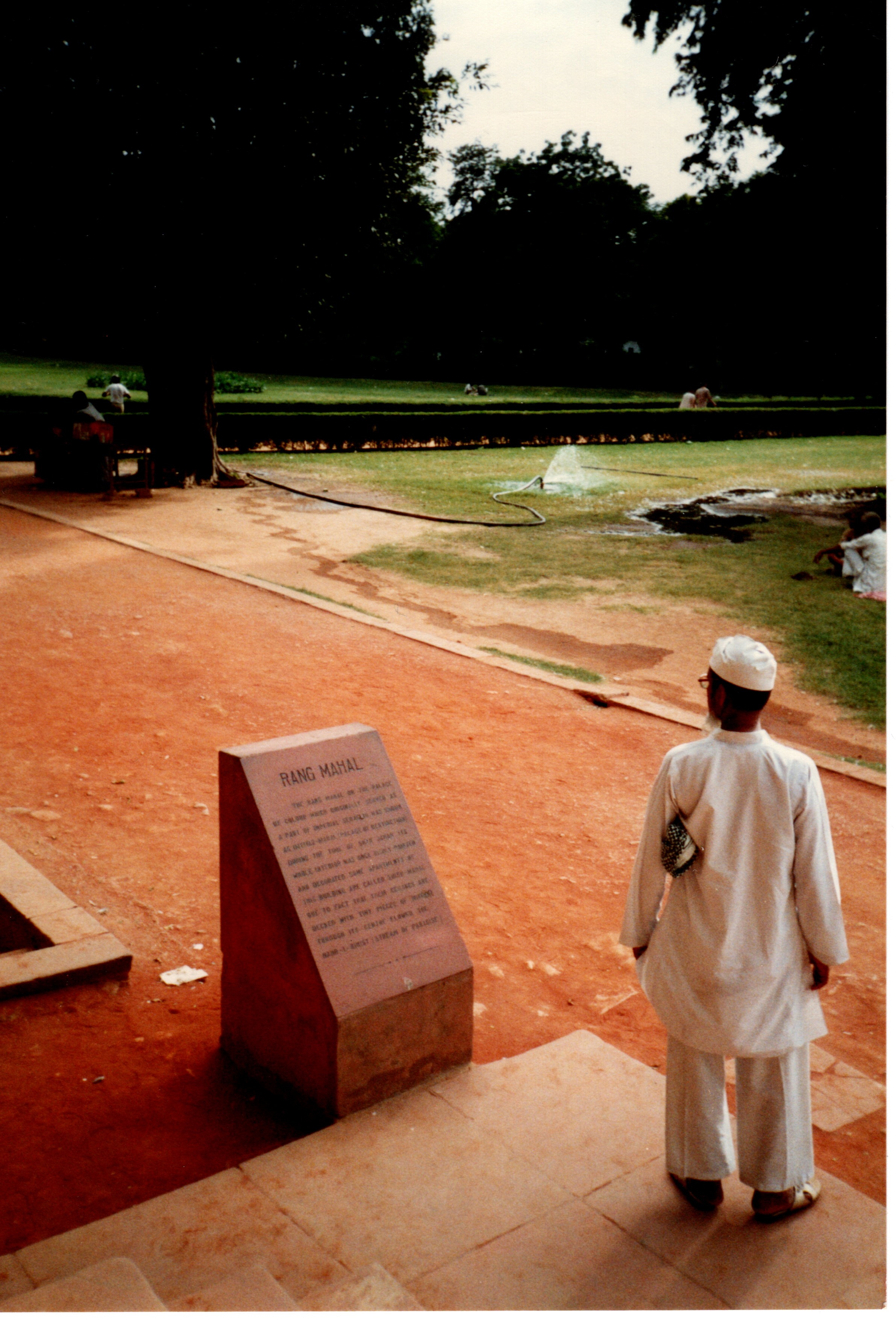
Rang Mahal Description
