= Golden Mosque (Red Fort) =

Mosque in Old Delhi, India

- Hindi: सुनहरी मस्जिद
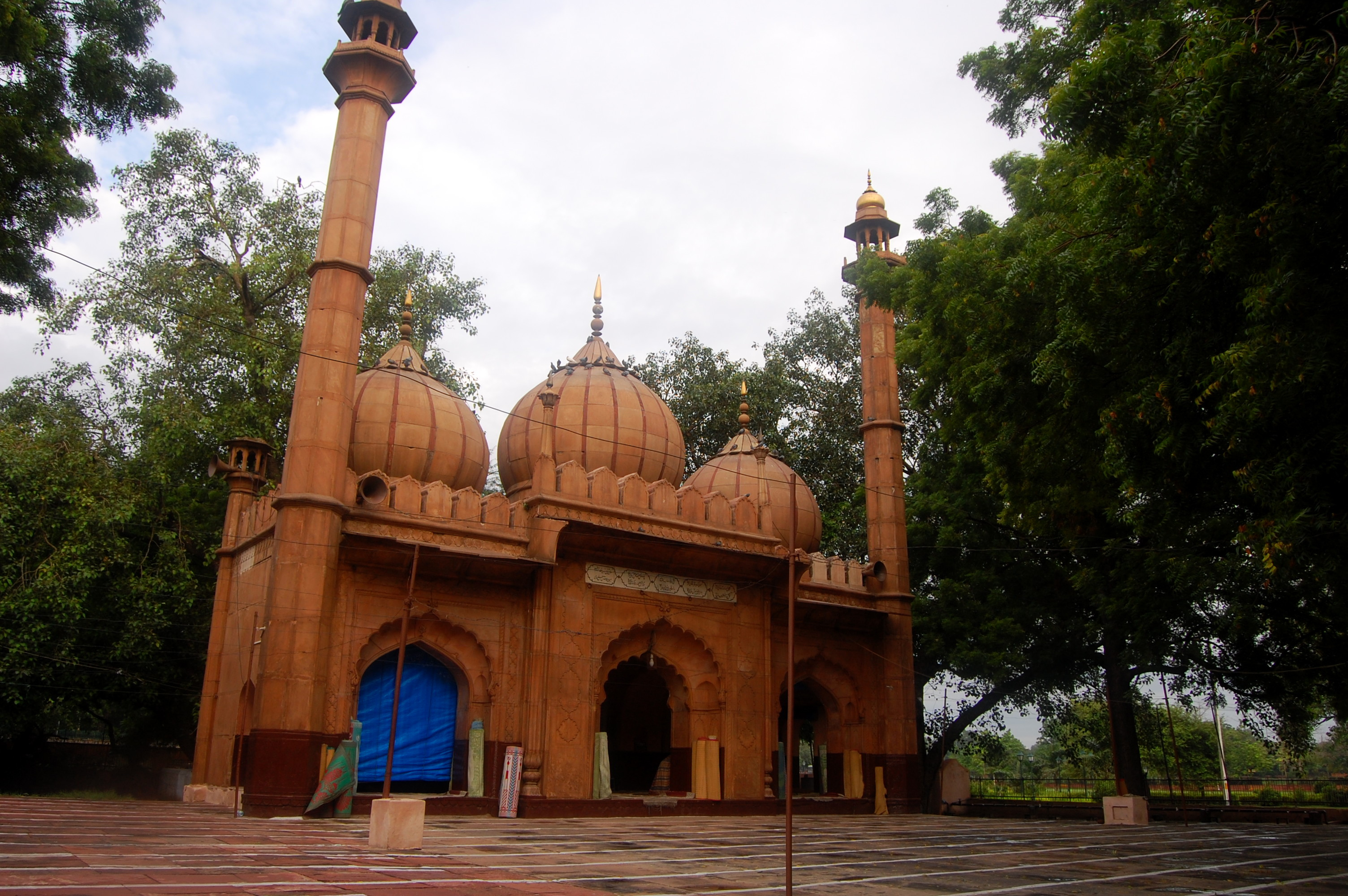
- The mosque exterior in 2009

- Location of the mosque in Central Delhi

Religion
- Affiliation: Islam
- Ecclesiastical or organisational status: Mosque
- Status: Active

Location
- Location: Delhi Gate, Red Fort, Old Delhi, Central Delhi
- Country: India
- Administration: Archaeological Survey of India
- Coordinates: 28°39′02″N 77°14′22″E

Architecture
- Type: Mosque architecture
- Style: Indo-Islamic; Mughal
- Founder: Qudsia Begum
- Completed: 1751

Specifications
- Dome: Three (maybe more)
- Minaret: Two
- Materials: Stone; red sandstone; copper; white marble

Monument of National Importance
- Official name: Sunehri Masjid (Red Fort)
- Reference no.: N-DL-45

The Golden Mosque (Hindi: सुनहरी मस्जिद), or Sunehri Masjid, is a mosque in the Chandni Chowk neighbourhood of Old Delhi, in Central Delhi, India. The mosque is located outside the southwestern corner of the Delhi Gate of the Red Fort, opposite the Netaji Subhash Park.

The mosque is a Monument of National Importance, administered by the Archaeological Survey of India.

== History ==
The mosque was constructed between 1747 and 1751 by the order of Qudsia Begum for Nawab Bahadur Javed Khan, a nobleman during the reign of the Emperor Ahmad Shah Bahadur. Qudsia Begum was the mother of Emperor Ahmad Shah Bahadur. Javed Khan was the supervisor of the harem and was in great favour with the begum and therefore was very influential. He was later assassinated.

Nawab Ahmad Bakhsh Khan, father of the Nawab of Firozpur, repaired the mosque to benefit the neighbourhood. Not long after its renovation, Nawab Ahmad Bakhsh Khan was attacked by an infuriated elephant while out with his son. His horse was killed in the attack, and his vehicle was destroyed. The Nawab and his son were only saved from death by taking refuge inside this mosque.

== Architecture ==
The Sunehri Masjid is made of bassee jung, a light salmon-coloured stone not usually used for building mosques, which gives the building a singular and picturesque appearance.

The mosque is surmounted by three domes, which were originally gilt with copper from which it derives its name. The mosque has a main prayer hall and two minarets. The central arch of the mosque bears an inscription about the builder of the mosque and the date of its construction. In 1852, Bahadur Shah II had the mosque repaired and replaced the copper plates of the domes with sandstone facing.

== Gallery ==
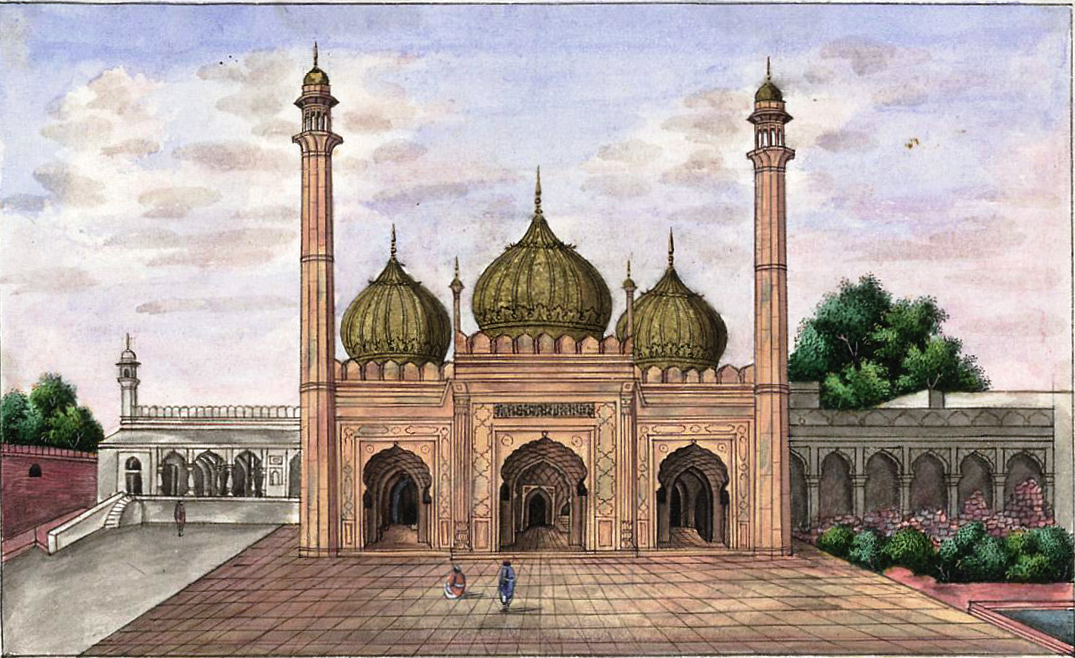
Painting of the mosque, published in Reminiscences of Imperial Delhi, 1843

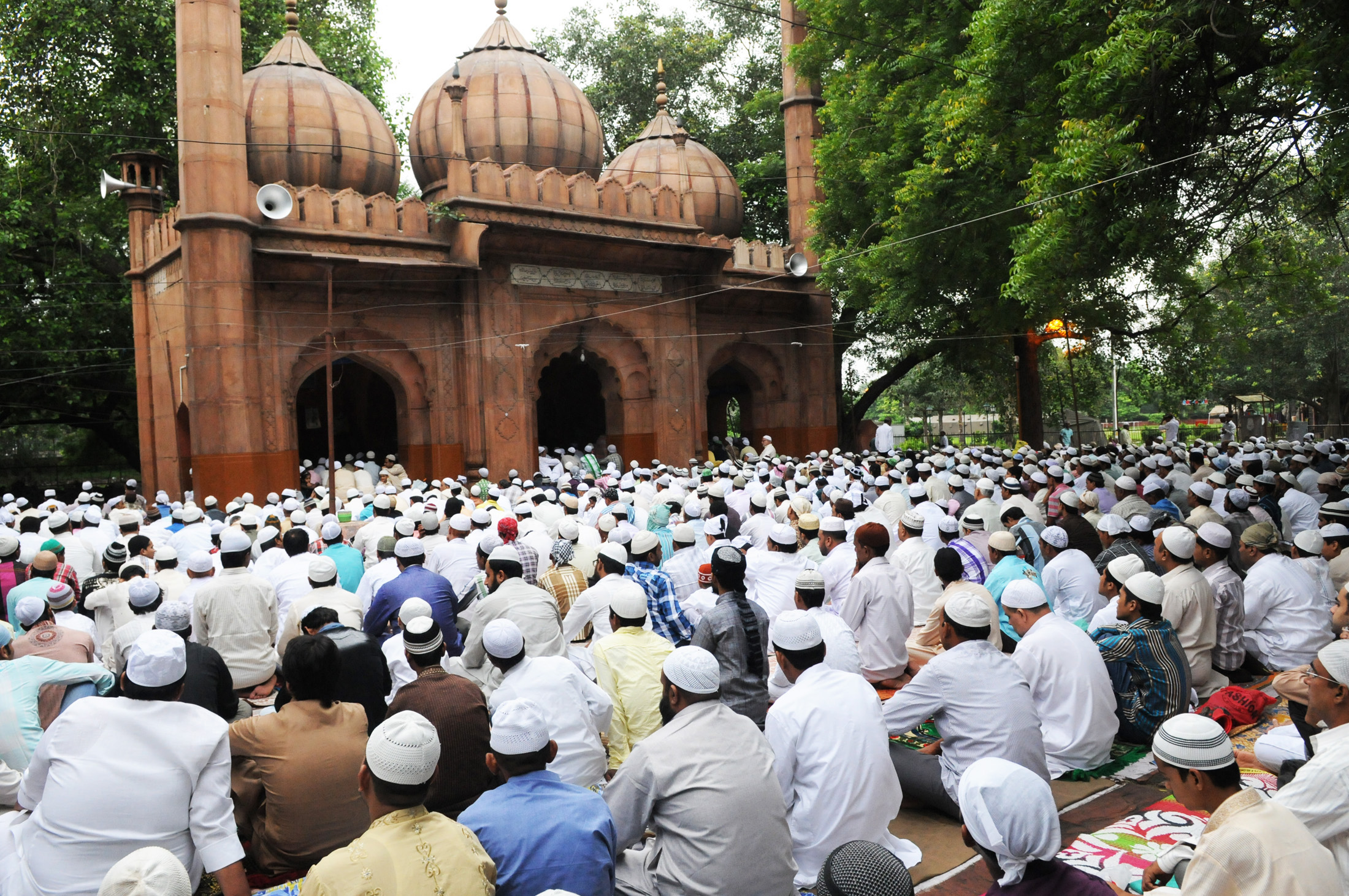
Worshippers offering namaz during Idu’l Fitr, 1434 AH (2012/2013 CE)

== See also ==
- Islam in India
- List of mosques in India
- List of Monuments of National Importance in Delhi
