= Chhatta Chowk =

Marketplace in the Red Fort of Delhi, India

Coordinates: 28.655847°N 77.239261°E

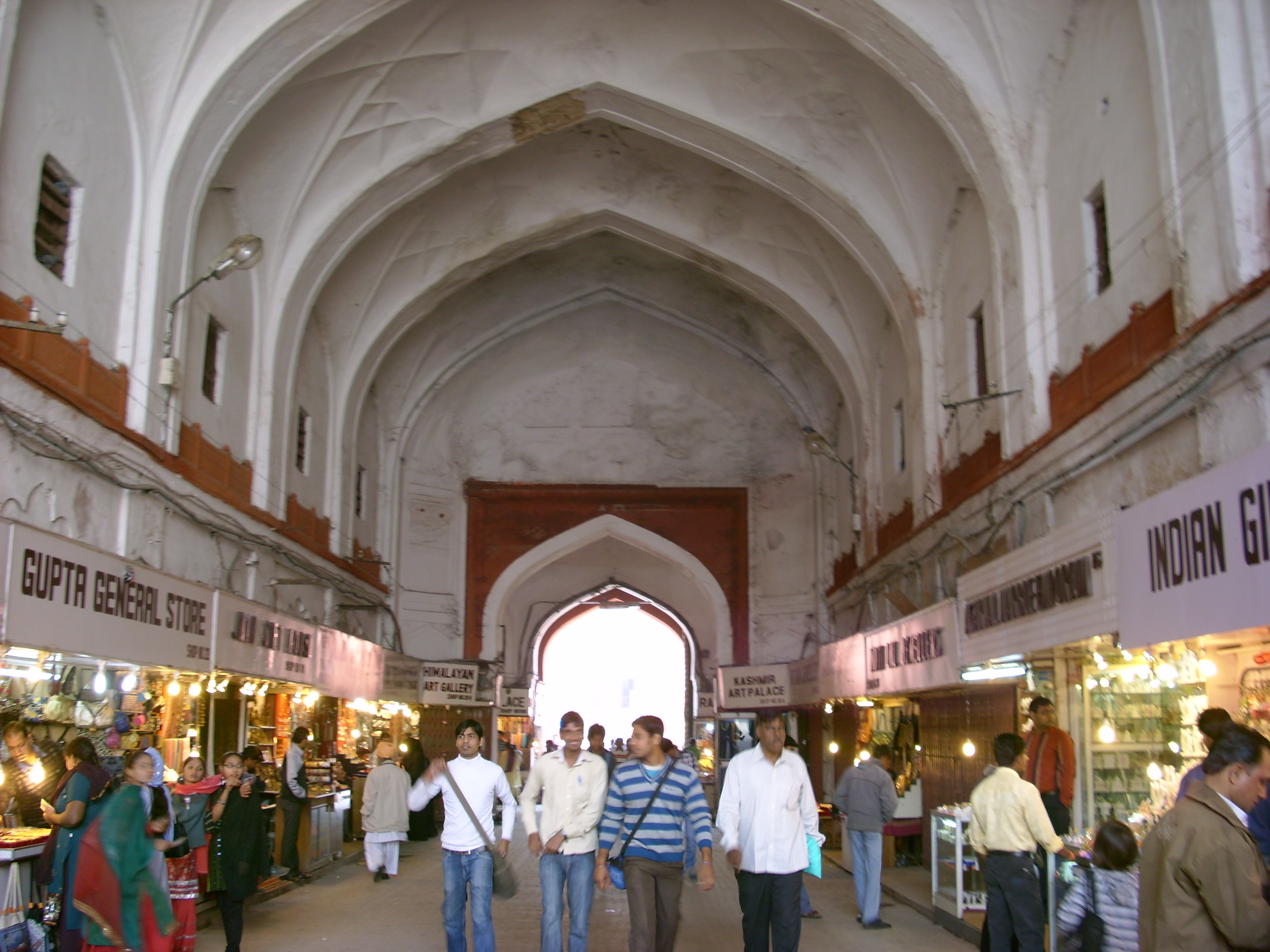
Chhatta Chowk

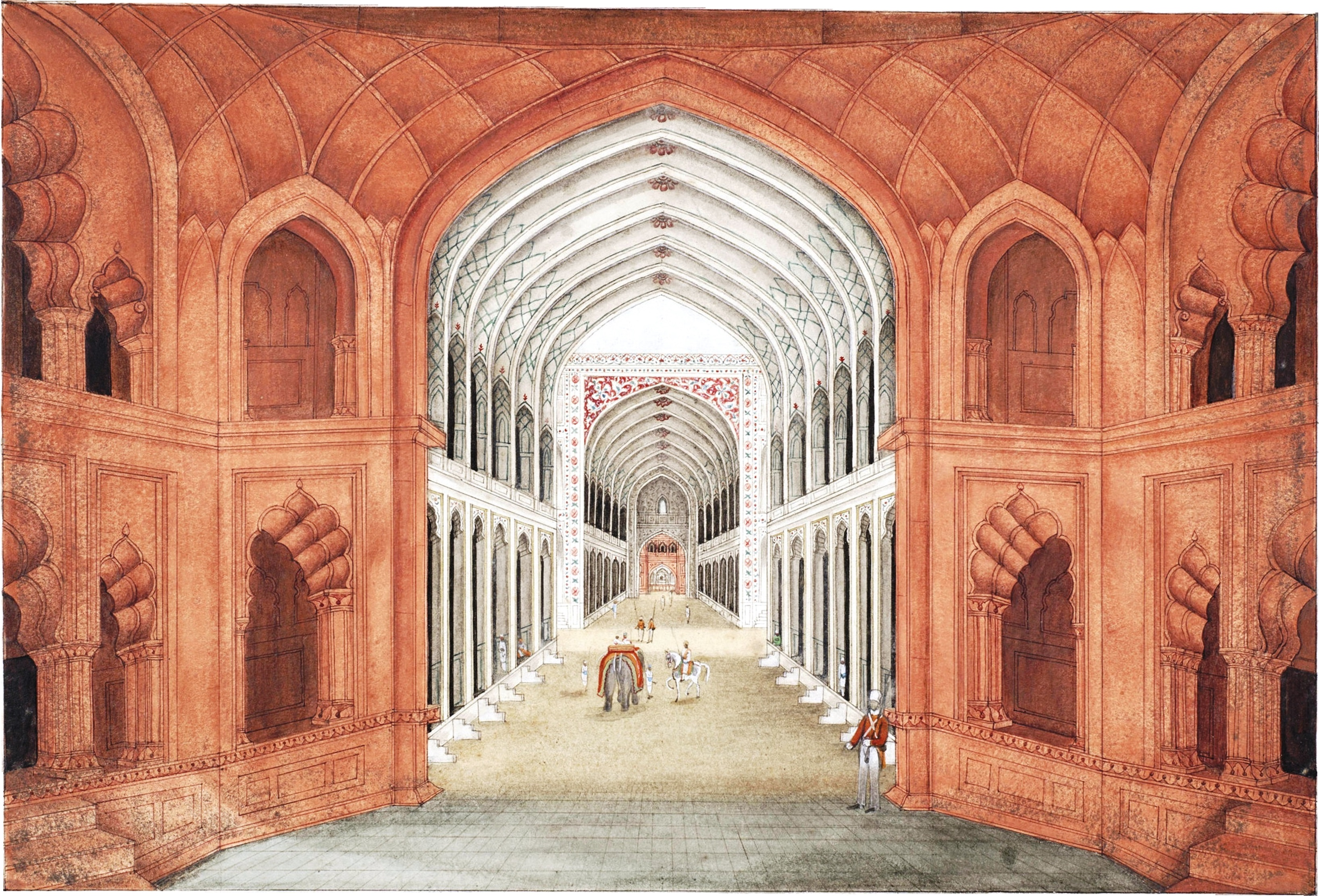
Drawing of the Chhatta Chowk in the early 1850s, by Ghulam Ali Khan

The Chhatta Chowk (transl. Covered Bazaar) is a long passage way that contains a bazaar, or market, located in the Red Fort of Old Delhi, India.

The Chhatta Chowk is located behind the Lahori Gate and is set within an arched passage. It is lined with two-story flats that contain 32 arched bays serving as shops. During Shah Jahan's reign, the Chhatta Chowk was very exclusive, specializing in trading goods such as silk, brocades, velvet, gold, silverware, jewellery, gems and precious stones, catering to the luxurious tastes of imperial households.

Its history dates back to the 17th century. It was inspired by another covered bazaar in Peshawar, built by leading noble Ali Mardan Khan, which Shah Jahan had seen in 1646; the emperor subsequently instructed that the plans of the bazaar be sent to Makramat Khan, supervisor of the fort's construction, to build a similar bazaar in the fort.

It is a unique example of Mughal architecture in which bazaars were typically open-air. As such, the bazaar was formerly known as Bazaar-i-Musaqaf, with a saqaf, meaning "roof".

The arches were walled up in the 20th century and the passage thus lost its original appearance. The ceiling was also originally painted in colours. There are plans to restore the bazaar.
