= Lahori Gate, Red Fort, Delhi =

Entrance of the Red Fort, Delhi, India

Coordinates: 28.655918°N 77.238459°E

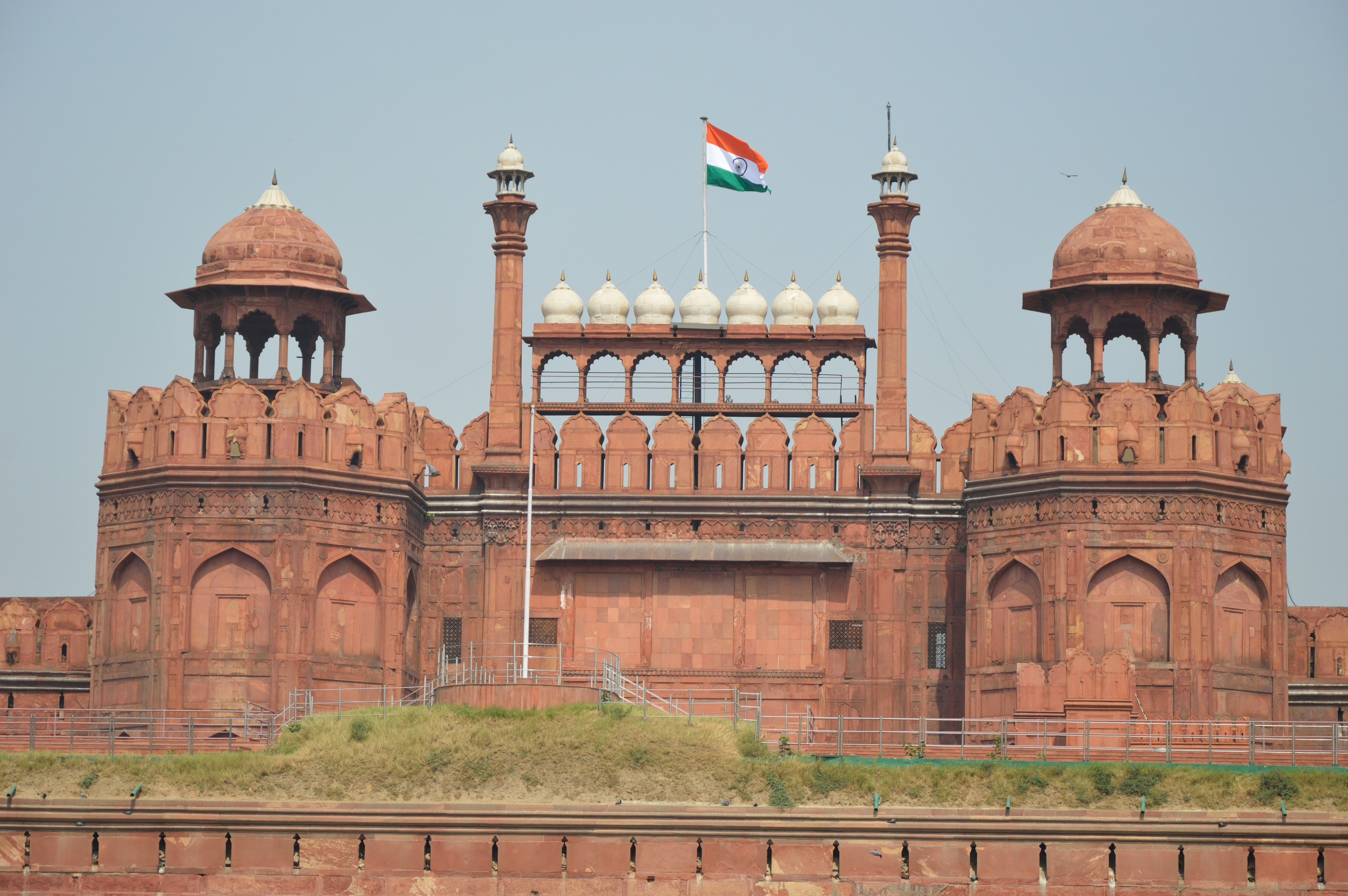
Lahori Gate faces the direction of Lahore, Pakistan

The Lahori Gate is the main entrance to the Red Fort in Old Delhi. The fort is approached through a covered street flanked by arcaded apartments called the Chhatta Chowk. Situated on the western wall of the fort, the gate received its name because it led to the city of Lahore, (present day Pakistan). The secondary entrance is the Delhi Gate.

The gateway consists of three stories, each decorated with square, rectangular and cusped arched panels. These are flanked by semi-octagonal towers crowned by two open octagonal pavilions. The whole gate is clad in red sandstone, except the roofs of the pavilions, where white stone is used. Between the two pavilions is a screen of miniature chhatris having seven miniature marble domes. Continuing around the whole wall are flame-shaped battlements.

The gate was provided with a 10.5 high metre barbican by Aurangzeb (1658-1707), with its entrance to the north. It is said that Shah Jahan, while under house arrest, wrote to Aurangzeb and criticized his decision: "You have made a fort a bride, and set a veil on it."

Every year since Indian Independence Day in 1947, the national flag has been raised and the Prime Minister has made a speech from the ramparts at the gate. In the 1980s, the security of the area was increased by blocking the tower windows as a security measure against sniper attacks. A lift was also added to the gate.

== Gallery ==
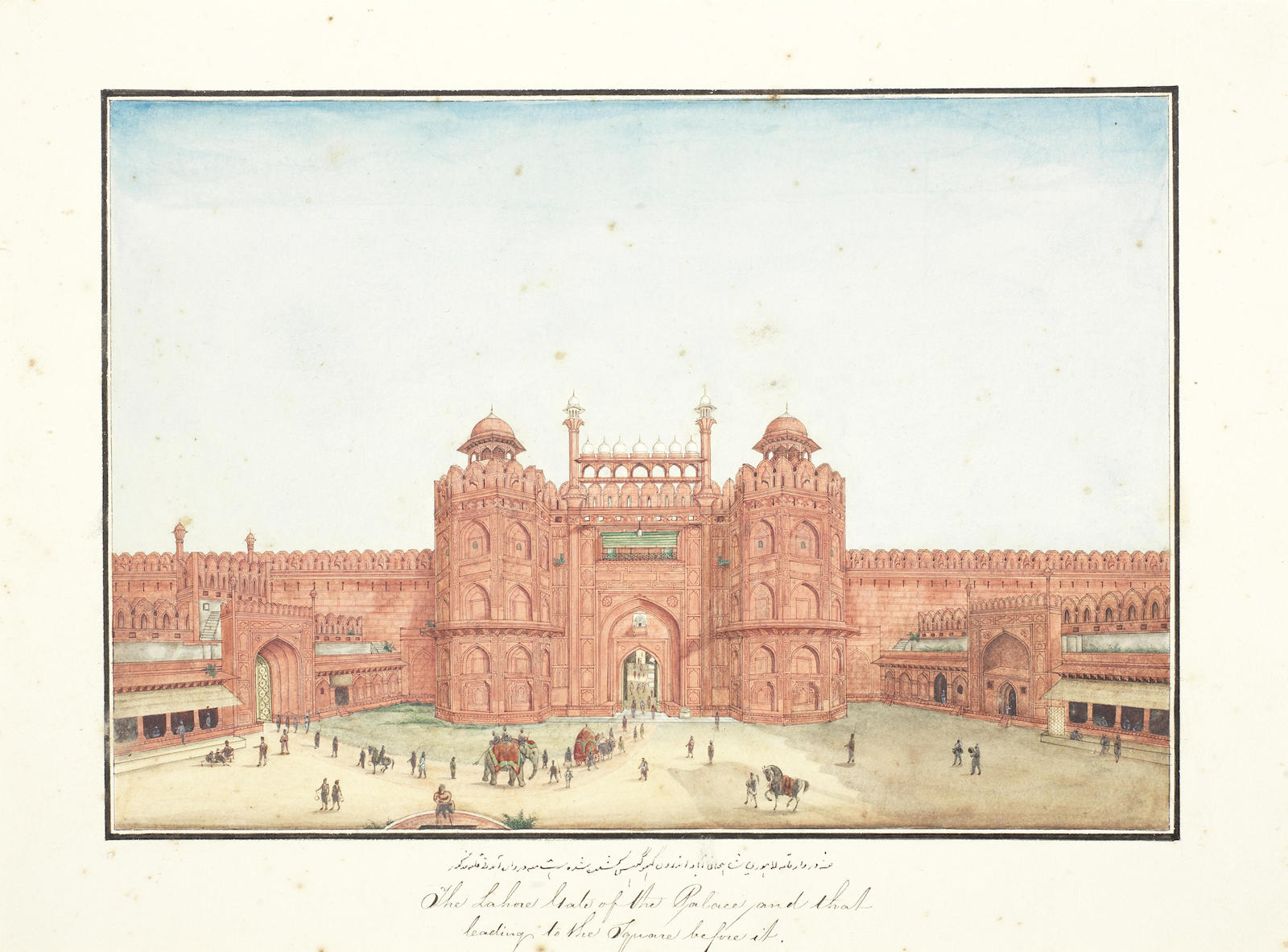
Painting of Lahori gate by Ghulam Ali Khan, Mughal period, 1852-4

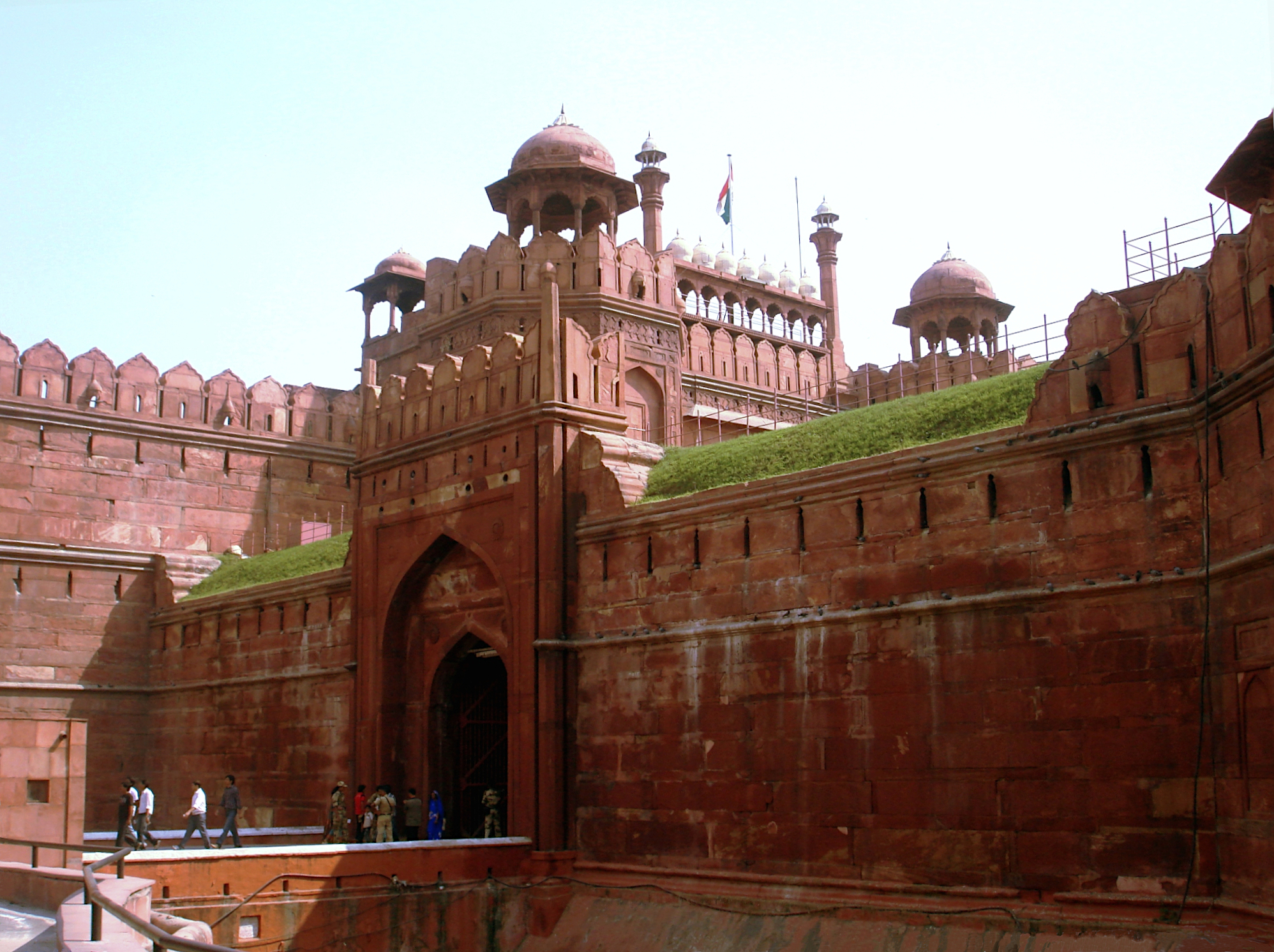
Lahori gate in 2013

The Lahori gate of the Red fort

== See also ==
- Gates of Delhi
- List of Gates in Aurangabad, Maharashtra
