= Delhi Gate, Red Fort =

Coordinates: 28.651985°N 77.240105°E

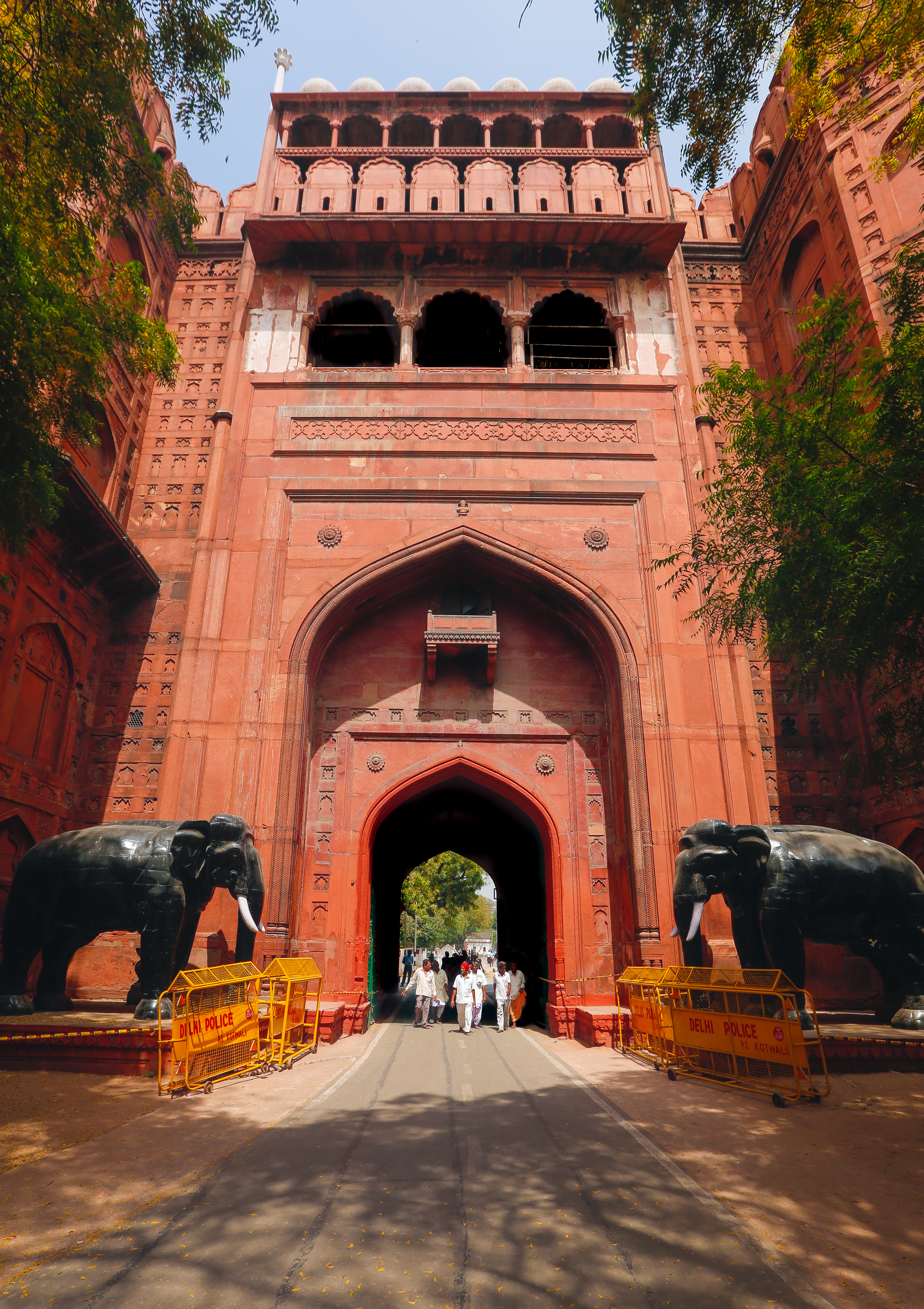
Delhi Gate, the second entrance to the Red Fort

The Delhi Gate is an entrance to the Red Fort in Old Delhi and is on the Fort's southern wall. The gate received its name from the Fort's city. The primary gate is the Lahori Gate, which is very similar in appearance.

The gate was constructed under Shah Jahan. It was provided with a 10.5 high metre barbican by Aurangzeb, facing west.

The gateway consists of three stories and is decorated with square, rectangular, and cusped arched panels. These panels are flanked by semi-octagonal towers crowned by two open octagonal pavilions. Red sandstone adorns the gate while the pavilion roofs are in white stone. Between the two pavilions is a screen of miniature chhatris with seven miniature marble domes. Flame-shaped battlements encompass the wall.

Near it on the right the last emperor was imprisoned after September 1857. Between the inner and outer gates stand two large stone elephants without riders. They were replaced here by the gift of Lord Curzon. Beyond the southern glacis of the fort, on which a cross marks the site of the old cemetery, are the gardens and cantonment of Darya-ganj. The latter is bounded on the west by the Faiz Bazar leading to the Delhi Gate.

== History ==
The Delhi Gate was commissioned by Mughal emperor Shah Jahan as part of his new capital Shahjahanabad (Old Delhi) in the 17th century. The Red Fort’s walls were laid out on an octagonal plan, with the western Lahori Gate and southern Delhi Gate as the two main gateways. Shah Jahan’s chief architect, Ustad Ahmad Lahori, designed the Fort’s gates in the ornate Shahjahani idiom. The Delhi Gate was built of brick faced with red sandstone, rising in three stories with an arched central passage.

In its early use the Delhi Gate served a functional role. As the UNESCO World Heritage dossier notes, the Lahori Gate was the ceremonial entrance used by visitors and the emperor himself, whereas the Delhi Gate was "used mainly by soldiers and all other people working in the fort". Two large marble elephants, which were originally positioned between the outer and inner gate arche had been part of the gateway’s ensemble. According to Alexander Cunningham’s Archaeological Survey of India reports (1860s), these black marble elephants (each bearing a red sandstone rider carved as Rajput hero Jaimal and Patta) were brought from Agra and stood at Delhi Gate. They were removed during or after the rebellion and displayed elsewhere, but around 1900 Lord Curzon, the British Viceroy, ordered the elephants reinstalled at the gate.

Through the 20th century, the Delhi Gate remained government property. After Indian independence in 1947, the Red Fort became a symbol of sovereignty and the Prime Minister now hoists the flag at the Lahori Gate every Independence Day. In 2025 Hindustan Times reported that gates are ruining due to negligence in maintenance.

== Architecture ==
The Delhi Gate embodies the classic Mughal gateway form of the Shahjahanabad period. Its façade is built of deep red sandstone, typical of Shah Jahan’s buildings, with its two taller octagonal towers flanking a three-story central bay. Panels of carved stone and painted plaster once adorned the facade, many of them featuring floral and geometric patterns. Although many decorations have worn or been lost, the surviving workmanship reflects the fusion of Persianate motifs with Indian craft. In general, the Red Fort’s architecture is noted for its cusped arches, inlaid marble and pietra dura panels, and intricate jali (latticed) screens.

A set of two life-sized black marble elephants were originally placed between the outer and inner arches of the gateway. Each elephant bore a rider statue on its back, carved from red sandstone. The riders were not random figures but portrayed the legendary Rajput chieftains Jaimal and Patta, heroes of Chittorgarh who had resisted the Mughal emperor Akbar in the 16th century.

== Conservation ==
The Delhi Gate today is protected as a cultural monument. It falls under the guardianship of India’s Archaeological Survey (ASI) by virtue of being a part of the Red Fort, which is a designated National Monument and UNESCO World Heritage site. In 2003, contractors from Archaeological Survey of India removed the gilded metal finials (pinnacles) from the Delhi Gate’s domes for cleaning. At the time, critics alleged that even some historic elements were being inappropriately altered. ASI responded that the finials were to be reinstalled after cleaning. In the same period, a 19th-century water tank behind the gate was demolished, ASI justified this by saying the tank was a later (British-era) addition not original to Shah Jahan’s design
