= Red Fort =

Historical Mughal fort in Delhi, India

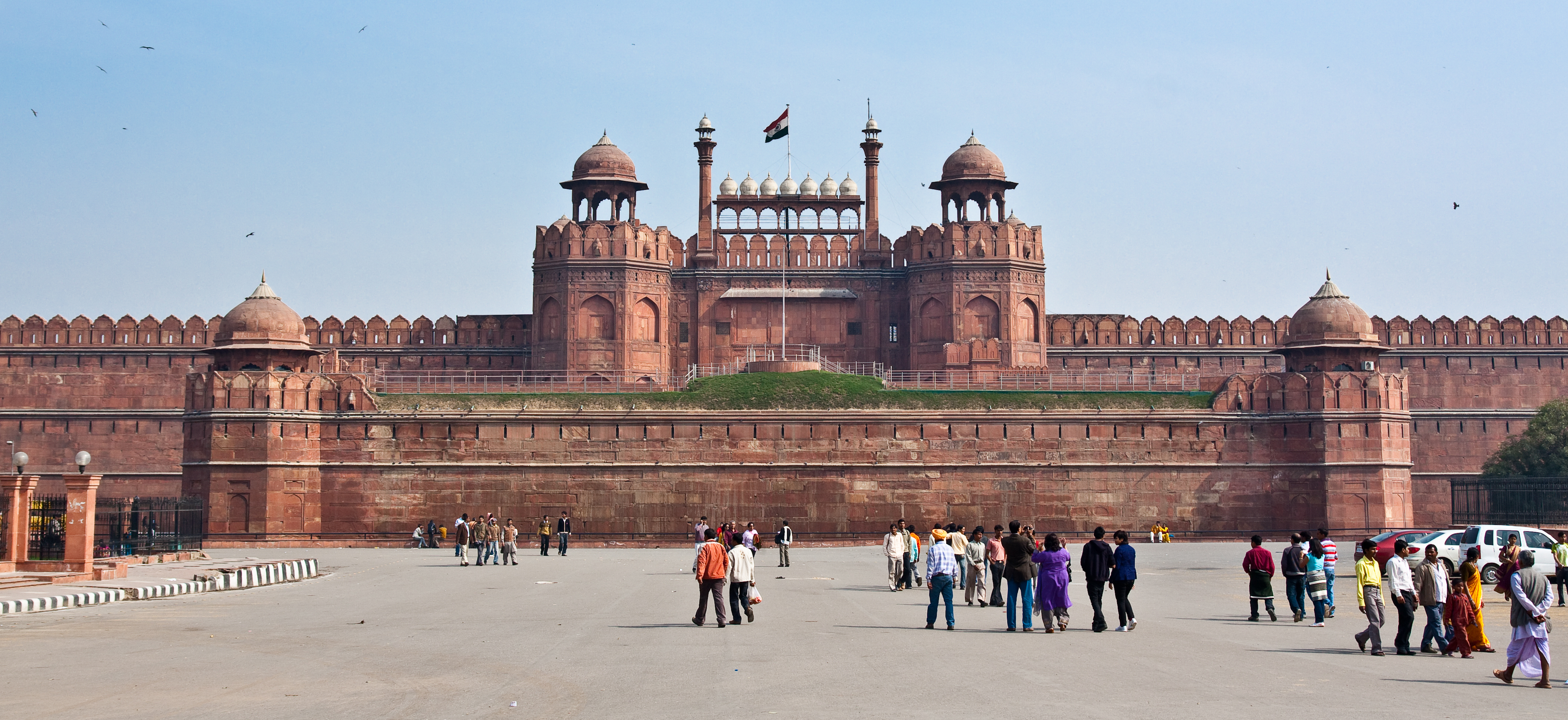
- A view of the Red Fort's Lahori Gate

- Location in Delhi, India
- 28°39′21″N 77°14′27″E
- Location: Old Delhi, Delhi, India

History
- Built: 12 May 1639 – 6 April 1648; 378 years ago
- Built for: Mughal Empire

Site notes
- Height: 18–33 m (59–108 ft)
- Architect: Ustad Ahmad Lahori
- Architectural style: Indo-Islamic architecture
- Owner: Mughal Empire (1648–1857); Sikh Confederacy (1783-1787); Maratha Empire (1788–1803); Government of British India (1857–1947); Government of India (1947–present)

UNESCO World Heritage Site
- Official name: Red Fort Complex
- Type: Cultural
- Criteria: II, III, VI
- Designated: 2007 (31st session)
- Reference no.: 231rev
- Region: Indo-Pacific

The Red Fort (Lal Qila in Hindi; Hindi pronunciation: [laːl 'qɪlaː]) is a historic Mughal fort located in the Old Delhi area of Delhi, India. Serving as the main residence of the Mughal emperors, it was commissioned by Emperor Shah Jahan on the 12th of May 1639; the fort was constructed following his decision to shift the Mughal capital from Agra to Delhi. Originally adorned in red and white, the fort's design is attributed to Ustad Ahmad Lahori, the architect of the Taj Mahal. The Red Fort is a prominent example of Mughal architecture from Shah Jahan's reign, combining Persian and Indian architectural styles.

During the invasion by Nadir Shah of the Afsharid Empire in 1739, the fort was plundered and stripped of its artwork and jewels. Following the Indian Rebellion of 1857, many of its marble structures were demolished by the British, although the defensive walls remained largely intact. The fort was later repurposed as a military garrison.

On 15 August 1947, the first Prime Minister of India, Jawaharlal Nehru, hoisted the Indian flag above the Lahori Gate, the main entrance of the Red Fort. Since then, the Prime Minister of India has ceremonially raised the national tricolour at the main gate each year on Independence Day, then delivering a nationally broadcast address from its ramparts.

The Red Fort, as part of the Red Fort Complex, was recognised as a UNESCO World Heritage Site in 2007.

== Etymology ==
The name Red Fort is a translation of the Hindustani Lāl Qila (Hindi: लाल क़िला, Urdu: لال قلعہ), derived from the fort's red sandstone walls. Lal means "red" in Hindi, while Qila comes from Arabic, meaning "fortress." Originally known as the "Blessed Fort" (Qila-i-Mubārak), it served as the residence of the imperial family. The term Lāl Qila is also used to refer to the Agra Fort.

== History ==
=== Mughal ===
Emperor Shah Jahan commissioned the construction of the Red Fort on 12 May 1638, following his decision to shift his capital from Agra to Delhi. The design of the Red Fort is attributed to the architect Ustad Ahmad Lahori, renowned for his work on the Taj Mahal. It straddles the Yamuna River, which once fed the moats surrounding most of the walls. Construction began in the sacred Islamic month of Muharram, on 13 May 1638. Supervised by Shah Jahan, it was completed on 6 April 1648. The fort was originally adorned in red and white. Unlike other Mughal forts, the Red Fort's boundary walls are asymmetrical to contain and subsume the older Salimgarh Fort. The fortress-palace served as the centrepiece of Shahjahanabad, the city now known as Old Delhi. Shah Jahan's successor, Emperor Aurangzeb, enhanced the Red Fort by adding the Moti Masjid (Pearl Mosque) to the emperor's private quarters. He also constructed barbicans in front of the two main gates to create a more circuitous approach to the palace.

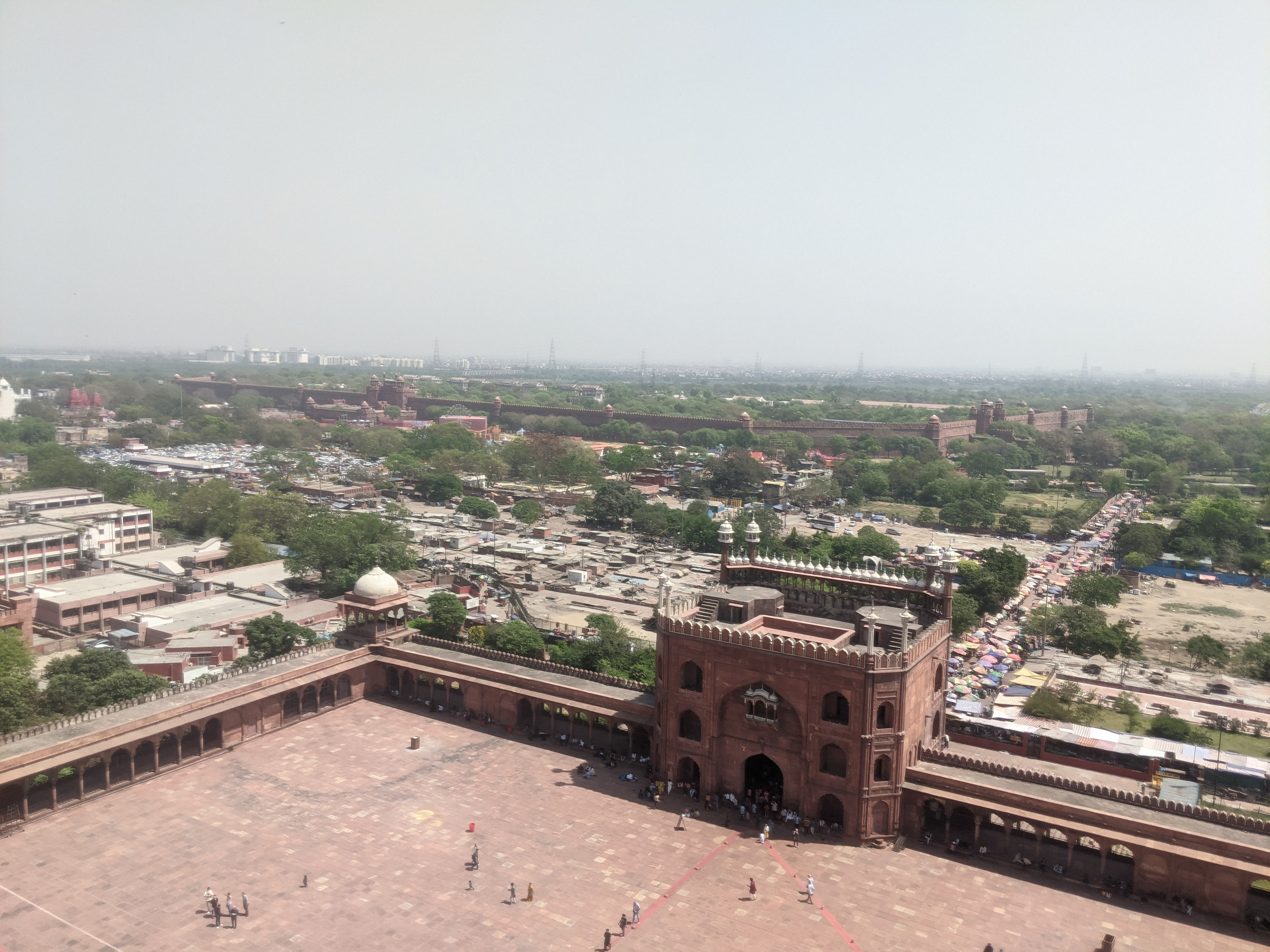
The Red Fort walls in the background, viewed from the top of Jama Masjid's tower

=== Maratha ===
Following the death of Emperor Aurangzeb, the administrative and fiscal structure of the Mughal dynasty experienced decline, leading to the degeneration of the palace during the 18th century. In 1712, Jahandar Shah was crowned the Mughal Emperor. Within a year of beginning his rule, Shah was murdered and replaced by Farrukhsiyar. In 1739, the Persian emperor Nadir Shah decisively defeated the Mughal army, despite its considerable strength of approximately 200,000 soldiers. Following his victory, he plundered the Red Fort, seizing its treasures, including the legendary Peacock Throne. After three months, Nadir Shah returned to Persia. His invasion left the city significantly damaged, and the Mughal Empire, under the next Mughal emperor Muhammad Shah's reign, was severely weakened. The internal weaknesses of the Mughal Empire reduced the Mughals to titular rulers of Delhi. A treaty signed in 1752 established the Marathas as the protectors of the throne in Delhi. The 1758 Maratha victory over the Afghans at Sirhind, followed by their defeat at Panipat, catapulted them into further conflict with Ahmad Shah Durrani.

In 1760, the Marathas stripped and melted the silver ceiling of the Diwan-i-Khas to raise funds for the defence of Delhi from the armies of Ahmed Shah Durrani. In 1761, after the Marathas lost the third battle of Panipat, Delhi was raided by Durrani. Ten years later, the Marathas, acting at the behest of the exiled Emperor Shah Alam II, recaptured Delhi from the Rohilla Afghans. Mahadaji Shinde, the commander of the Maratha Army, restored Shah Alam II to the throne.

In 1764, the Jat ruler of Bharatpur, Maharaja Jawahar Singh, attacked Delhi, and eventually captured the Red Fort of Delhi on 5 February 1765. Two days later, after exacting tribute from the Mughals, the Jats withdrew their forces from the Red Fort, seizing the Mughal throne. The throne now adorns the palace at Deeg, serving as a historical centrepiece. The doors of the fort are located in the Lohagarh Fort of Bharatpur.

In 1783, Sikh Misls led by Jassa Singh Ahluwalia, Jassa Singh Ramgarhia, and Baghel Singh conquered Delhi and the Red Fort. With a consolidated force consisting of 40,000 troops, they looted the area spanning from Awadh to Jodhpur. After negotiations, the Sikh forces agreed to withdraw from Delhi and reinstate the Mughal emperor Shah Alam II. As a condition of their retreat, the Jats stipulated the construction of seven Sikh gurdwaras in Delhi, including the Gurudwara Sis Ganj Sahib in Chandni Chowk.

In 1788, the grandson of Najib ad-Dawlah, Rohilla, Ghulam Kadir, looted Delhi and killed female members of the Mughal royal family. He also imprisoned Emperor Shah Alam II. Upon learning this, Mahadaji Shinde sent his men to free Shah Alam and pursue Kadir, who was hiding in Ghosgad in Rohilkhand. Kadir was eventually apprehended and beheaded. As a result of this, the Maratha flag was allowed to be hung from the Red Fort until 1803.

=== British ===
During the Second Anglo-Maratha War, British forces defeated a Maratha army led by Daulat Rao Sindhia in the Battle of Delhi, which marked the end of Maratha control over Delhi, including the Red Fort. Following the battle, the East India Company took over the administration of Mughal territories and installed a resident at the Red Fort. The last Mughal emperor to occupy the fort, Bahadur Shah Zafar, became a symbol of the Indian Rebellion of 1857 against Company rule in India, in which the residents of Shahjahanabad participated.

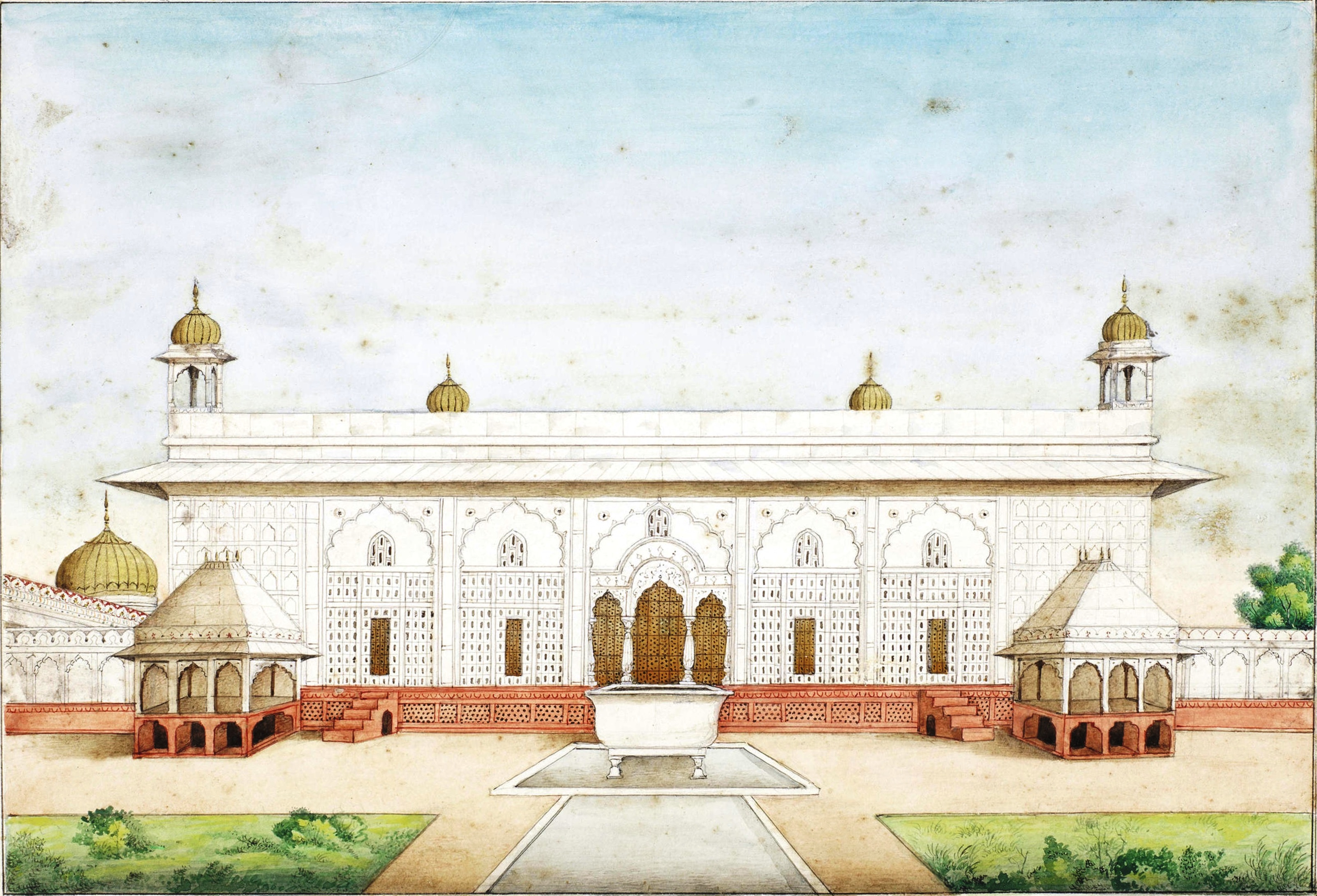
Rang Mahal in the mid-nineteenth century

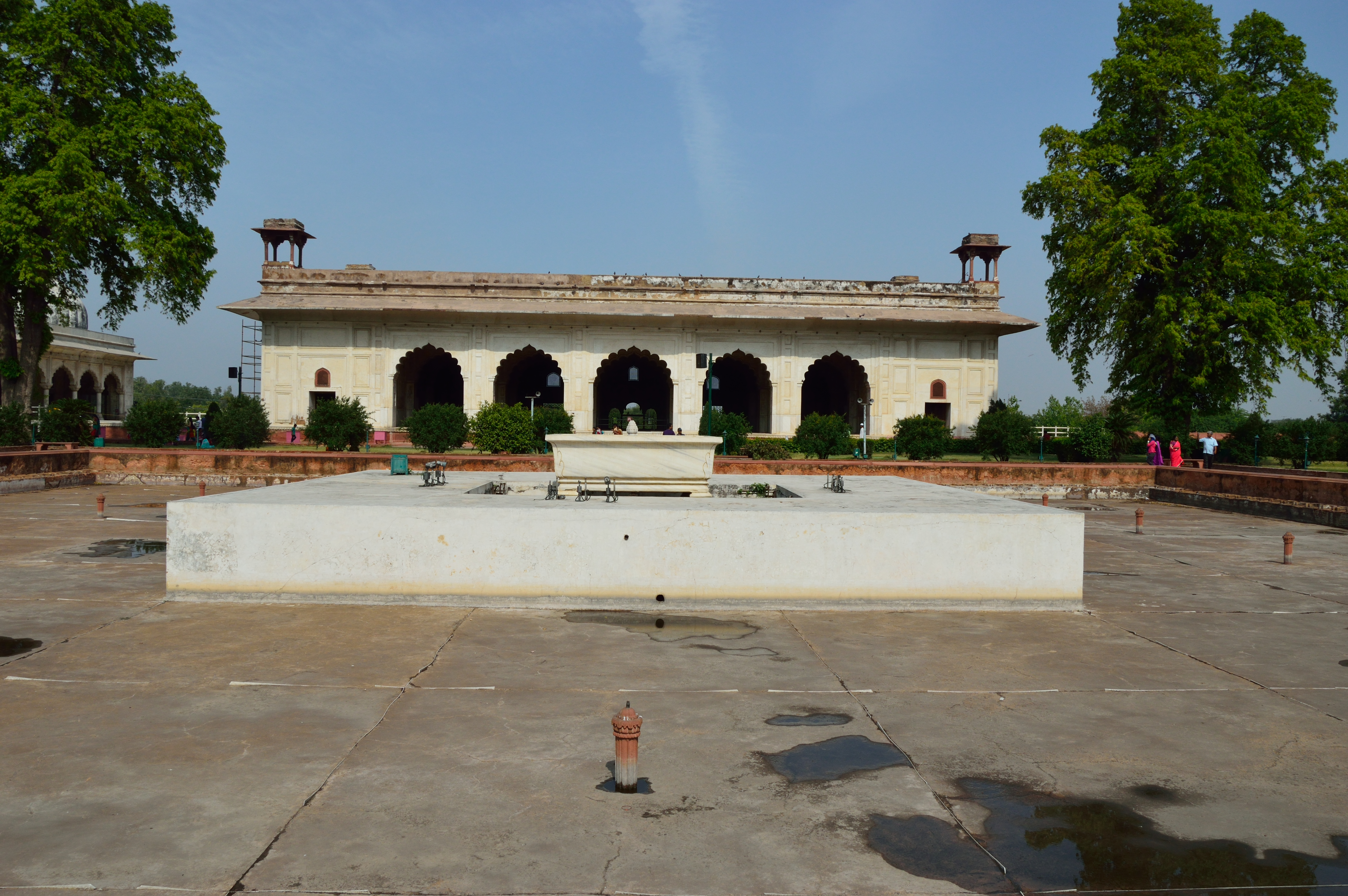
Rang Mahal today

Despite its position as the seat of Mughal power and its defensive capabilities, the Red Fort was not a site of any engagements during the 1857 rebellion. Bahadur left the fort on 17 September 1857 and was subsequently apprehended by British forces and returned to the Red Fort before being tried in 1858 and exiled to Rangoon in 7 October of that year.

Following the rebellion's suppression, British authorities ordered the systematic demolition of the Red Fort, during which 80% of the fort's structures were demolished, including the stone screen that once connected the pavilions along the river-facing façade of the fort. All the fort's furniture was either removed or destroyed; the harem apartments, servants' quarters, and gardens were demolished, and a line of stone barracks was erected atop them. Only the marble buildings on the east side of the imperial enclosure escaped complete destruction, although they were damaged while demolition was underway. While the defensive walls and towers were relatively unscathed, over two-thirds of the inner structures were demolished.

Lord Curzon, who served as the Viceroy of India from 1899 to 1905, initiated restoration efforts for the Red Fort. These included the reconstruction of its walls and the revival of its gardens, complete with an updated watering system.

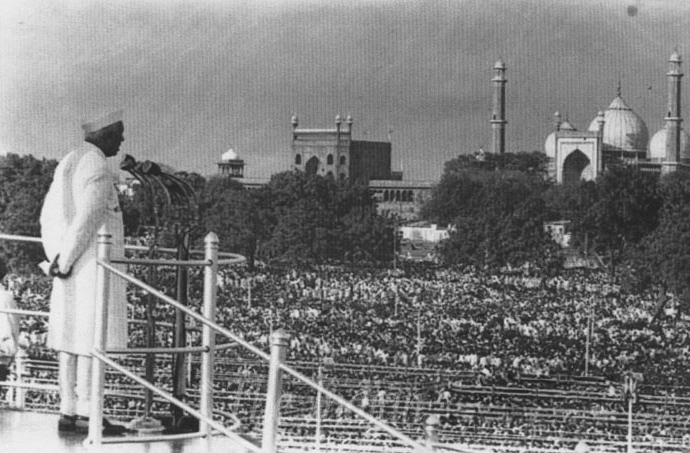
Prime Minister Nehru hoisting the tricolour on 15 August 1947, marking India's first Independence Day

The INA trials, also known as the Red Fort Trials, refer to the court-martial of a number of officers of the Indian National Army. The first trial was conducted at the Red Fort between November and December 1945. On 15 August 1947, the first prime minister of India, Jawaharlal Nehru, raised the Indian national flag above the Lahore Gate.

=== Indian ===
After Indian independence, the site experienced few changes, and the Red Fort continued to be used as a military cantonment. A significant portion of the Red Fort remained under the control of the Indian Army until 22 December 2003, when it was transferred to the Archaeological Survey of India for restoration and conservation. In 2009, the Comprehensive Conservation and Management Plan (CCMP), prepared by the Archaeological Survey of India under the auspices of a Supreme Court direction to revitalise the fort, was announced.

In the 21st century, several museums and galleries have been added to the Red Fort complex. Four of these museums, inaugurated in 2019, are housed in the colonial-era barracks within the complex. Barrack B1 is dedicated to the 1857 War of Independence, Barrack B2 commemorates the Jallianwala Bagh massacre, and Barrack B3 focuses on Subhas Chandra Bose and the Indian National Army movement. Barrack B4, known as Drishyakala, is a collaboration between the Archaeological Survey of India and the Delhi Art Gallery and showcases Indian art. The earlier museums, including the Indian Freedom Fighters' Museum, the Mumtaz Mahal Museum, and the Naubat Khana Museum, have been closed, with their exhibits relocated to these newly established museums.

== Archaeological finds ==
Archaeological excavations at the Red Fort have unearthed several Ochre Coloured Pottery culture artefacts dating from 2600 BCE to 1200 BCE.

== Modern era ==
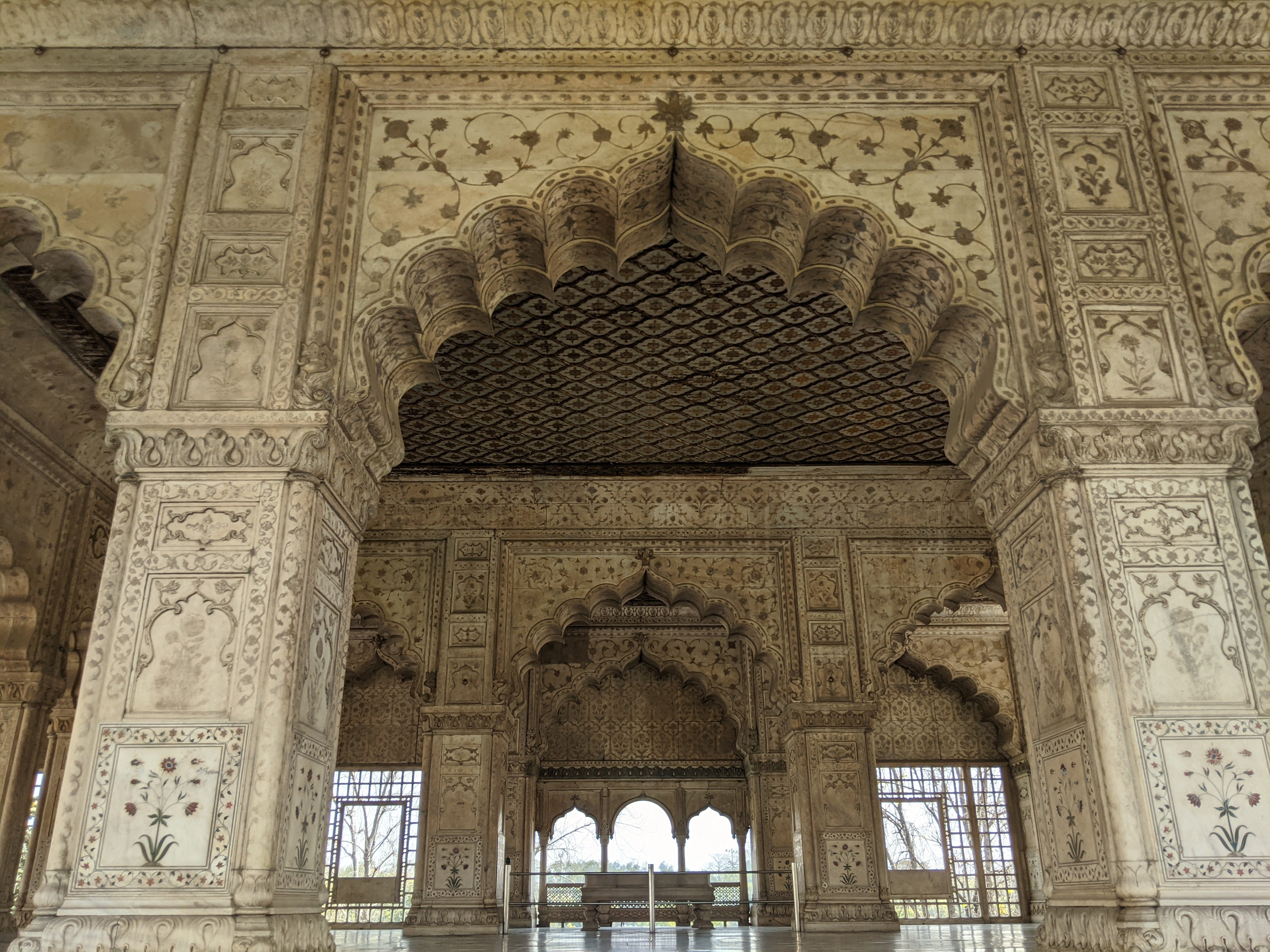
Inner walls and ceiling of the Diwan-e-Khas

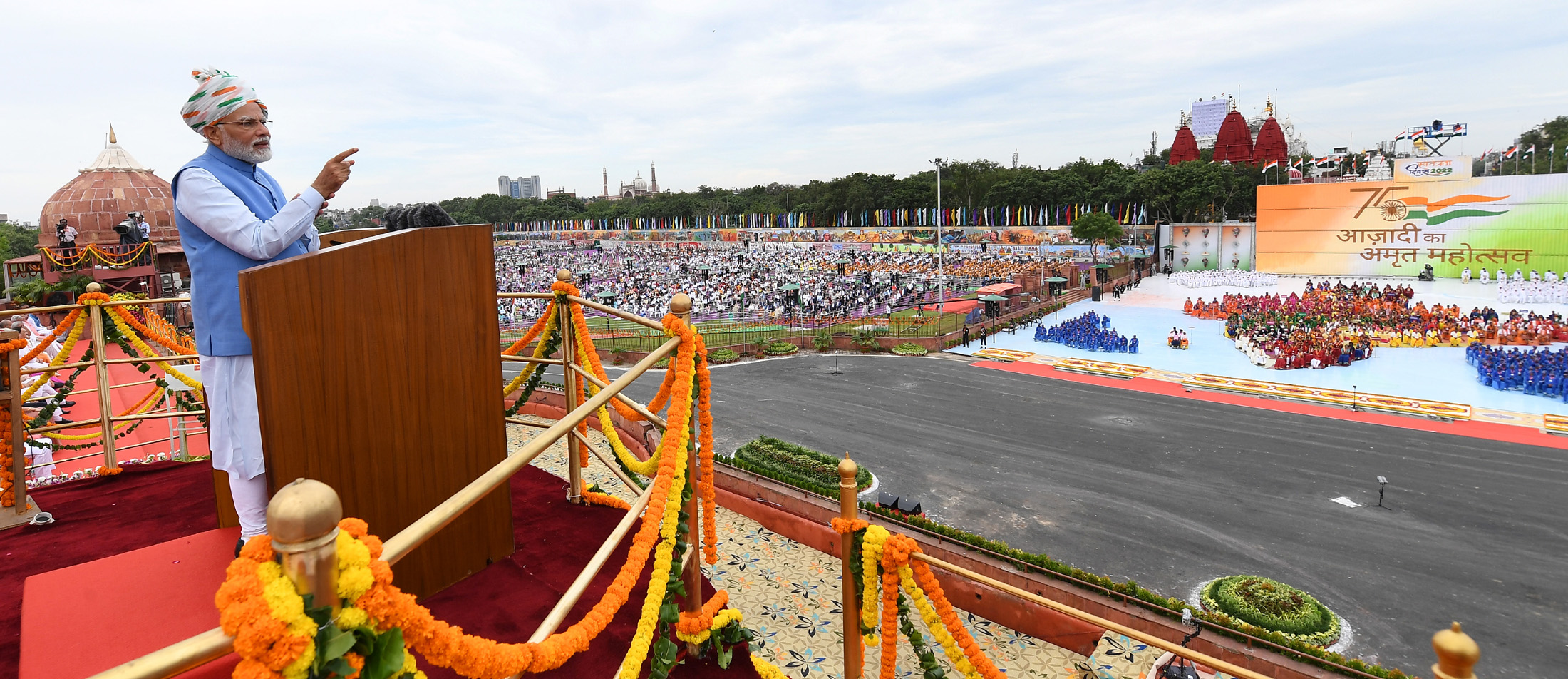
Prime Minister Narendra Modi delivers an address on August 15, 2022

The Red Fort, the largest monument in Old Delhi, is one of its most popular tourist destinations and attracts thousands of visitors every year. It is a monument of national significance; each year on India's independence day, observed on August 15, the Prime Minister hoists the national flag at the Red Fort and delivers a speech from its ramparts, which is broadcast nationwide. The fort also appears on the back of the ₹500 note of the Mahatma Gandhi New Series of the Indian rupee.

The Red Fort's architectural features are in varying states of preservation. While some structures remain relatively intact, retaining their original decorative elements, others have suffered significant damage, with inlaid marble floral designs removed by looters. The water features, once extensive, are now dry. The tea house, though not preserved in its historical form, functions as a working restaurant. The mosque and the hammam (public baths) are closed to visitors, who can only view them through glass windows or marble latticework. Walkways within the complex are deteriorating, and public toilets are available both at the entrance and inside the premises. The Lahori Gate serves as the main entrance, leading to a shopping area with jewelry and craft stores. The complex also houses a museum of "blood paintings," which narrate the stories of 20th-century Indian martyrs, alongside an archaeological museum and an Indian war-memorial museum.

=== 2000 terrorist attack ===
The Red Fort was the site of a terrorist attack on 22 December 2000, carried out by six Lashkar-e-Taiba operatives. Two soldiers and a civilian were murdered in what the news media described as an attempt to derail the then-ongoing India-Pakistan peace talks.

==== Security ====
To ensure security and prevent terrorist attacks, stringent measures are implemented around the Red Fort on the eve of the Indian Independence Day. Delhi Police and paramilitary forces maintain a vigilant presence in the neighbourhoods surrounding the fort, while National Security Guard sharpshooters are strategically stationed on high-rises near the site. The airspace around the fort is a designated no-fly zone during the celebration, and safe houses exist in the vicinity to which the prime minister and other dignitaries can be taken to in the event of an attack.

=== Adoption controversy ===
In April 2018, the Dalmia Group adopted the Red Fort for maintenance, development, and operations under the government's "Adopt A Heritage" scheme, through a contract worth ₹25 crores for a period of five years. A memorandum of understanding was signed with the ministries of Tourism and Culture and the Archaeological Survey of India. The adoption of the Red Fort by a private entity sparked outcry and widespread debate, drawing criticism from the public, historians, and political parties. The move also led to the trending of the hashtag #IndiaOnSale on Twitter. In May 2018, the Indian National Congress demanded the suspension of the agreement until an "impartial review" could be conducted by the Central Advisory Board of Archaeology or another recognized body of experts.

=== 2021 Indian farmers' Republic Day protest ===
On 26 January 2021, during the 2021 Indian farmers' Republic Day protest, a coterie of protesting farmers breached the fort, hoisted religious flags from its ramparts, and scaled the domes of the fort. One of the farmers was witnessed climbing a flagpole in front of the fort and hoisting the Nishan Sahib pennant on the flagpole. The fort sustained damage owing to clashes between the protestors and the police and was vacated following police announcements.

=== Discoloration of the Red Fort ===
Since the late 20th century, the monument has been affected by environmental pollution which has turned the Red Fort's color from red to black. According to recent Italo-Indian studies in September 2025, repeated events of air pollution has contributed to the formation of tarry black crusts forming on the Red Fort's walls. These black crusts are caused by pollutants, including particulate matter, nitrogen dioxide, sulfur dioxide, carbon monoxide, and toxic metals, such as lead, copper and zinc.

== Architecture ==
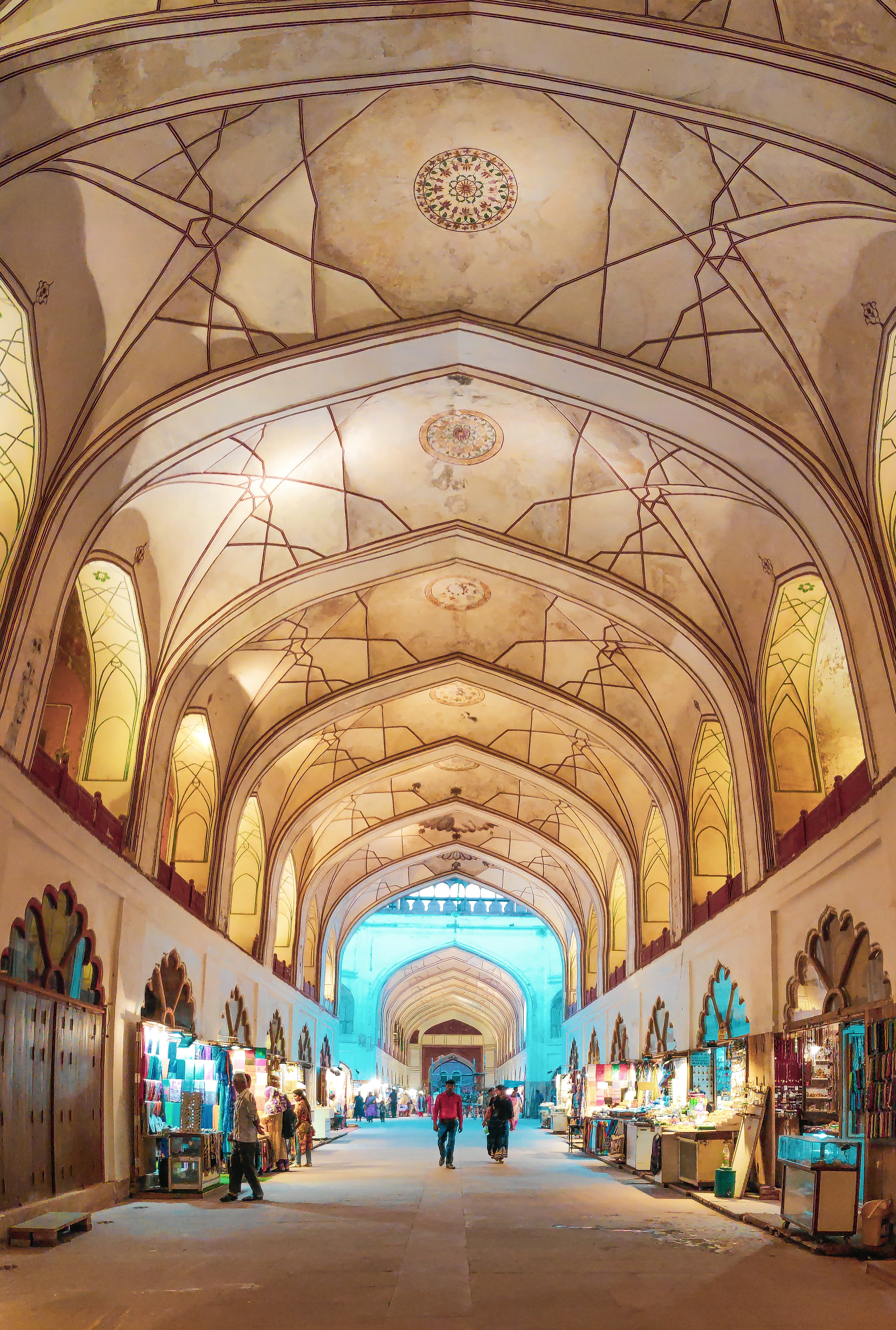
The barrel-vaulted structure located just beyond the Lahore Gate served as a market, originally to cater to high-ranking Mughal women residing within the fort

The World Heritage Convention characterises the Red Fort as embodying "the zenith of Mughal creativity". The fort synthesises Islamic palace structure with local traditions, resulting in a confluence of "Persian and Timurid architecture". The fort served as an inspiration for later buildings and gardens across the Indian subcontinent.

The Red Fort spans an area of 254.67 acres (103.06 hectares) and is enclosed by 2.41 kilometres (1.50 miles) of defensive walls. These walls, reinforced with turrets and bastions, vary in height from 18 meters (59 feet) on the river-facing side to 33 meters (108 feet) on the city-facing side. The fort is octagonal, with the north–south axis longer than the east–west axis. The marble, floral decorations and the fort's double domes exemplify later Mughal architecture.

The Red Fort showcases a high level of ornamentation, and the Kohinoor diamond was reportedly part of the furnishings. The artwork of the fort integrates Persian, European, and Indian artistic traditions, culminating in a distinctive Shahjahani style characterized by its richness in form, expression, and color. The Red Fort is one of India's most significant architectural complexes, encapsulating a rich history and diverse artistic traditions. Even prior to its designation as a monument of national importance in 1913, efforts were undertaken to ensure its preservation for posterity.

The Lahori and Delhi Gates were used by the public, whereas the Khizrabad Gate was reserved for the emperor. The Lahori Gate serves as the main entrance to the Red Fort, leading to the Chhatta Chowk, a domed shopping area often referred to as the covered bazaar.

== Major structures ==
The most significant surviving structures of the Red Fort include its walls and ramparts, the main gates, the audience halls, and the imperial apartments located along the eastern riverbank.

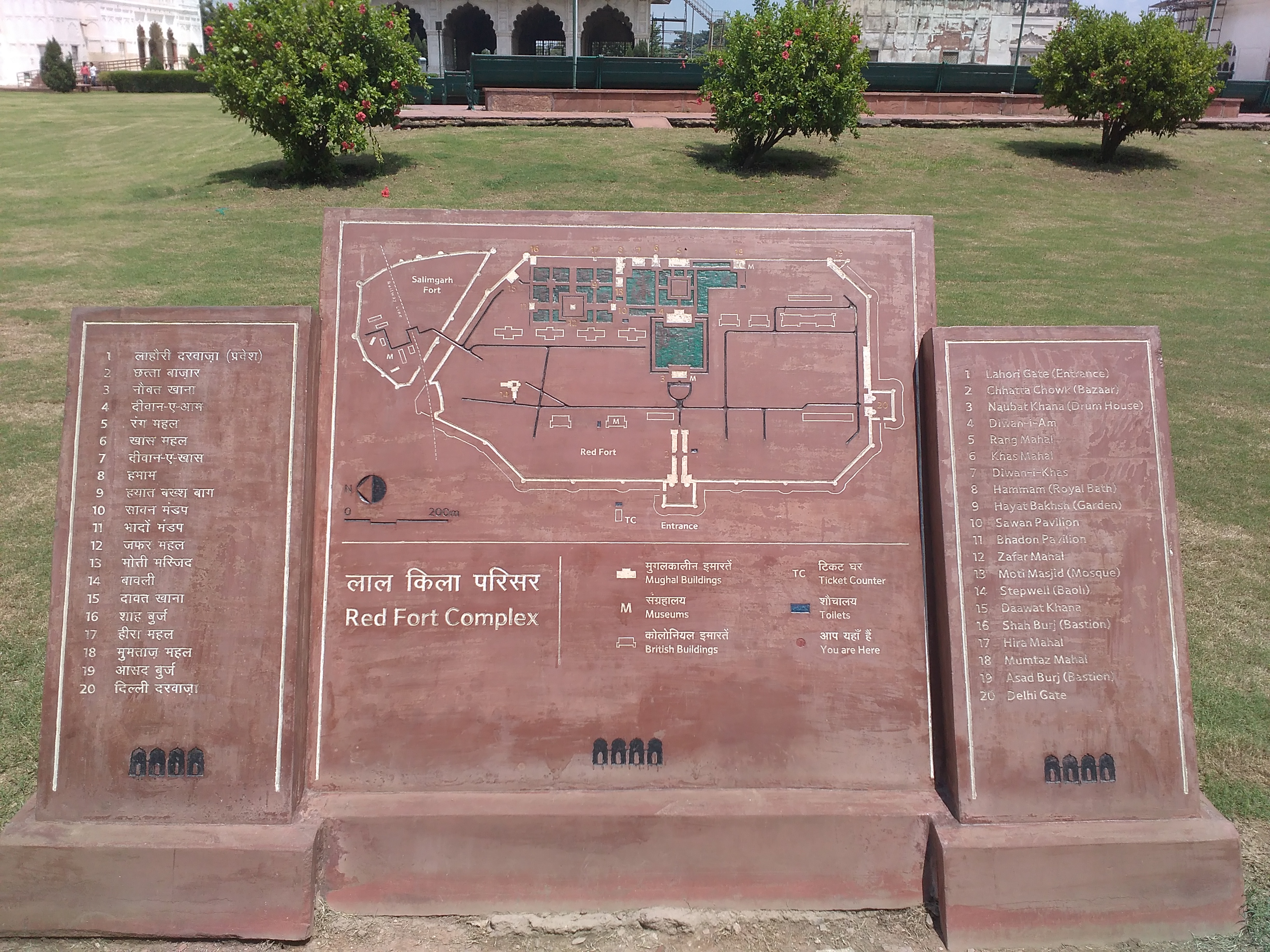
Plaque highlighting Red Fort's layout

=== Lahori Gate ===
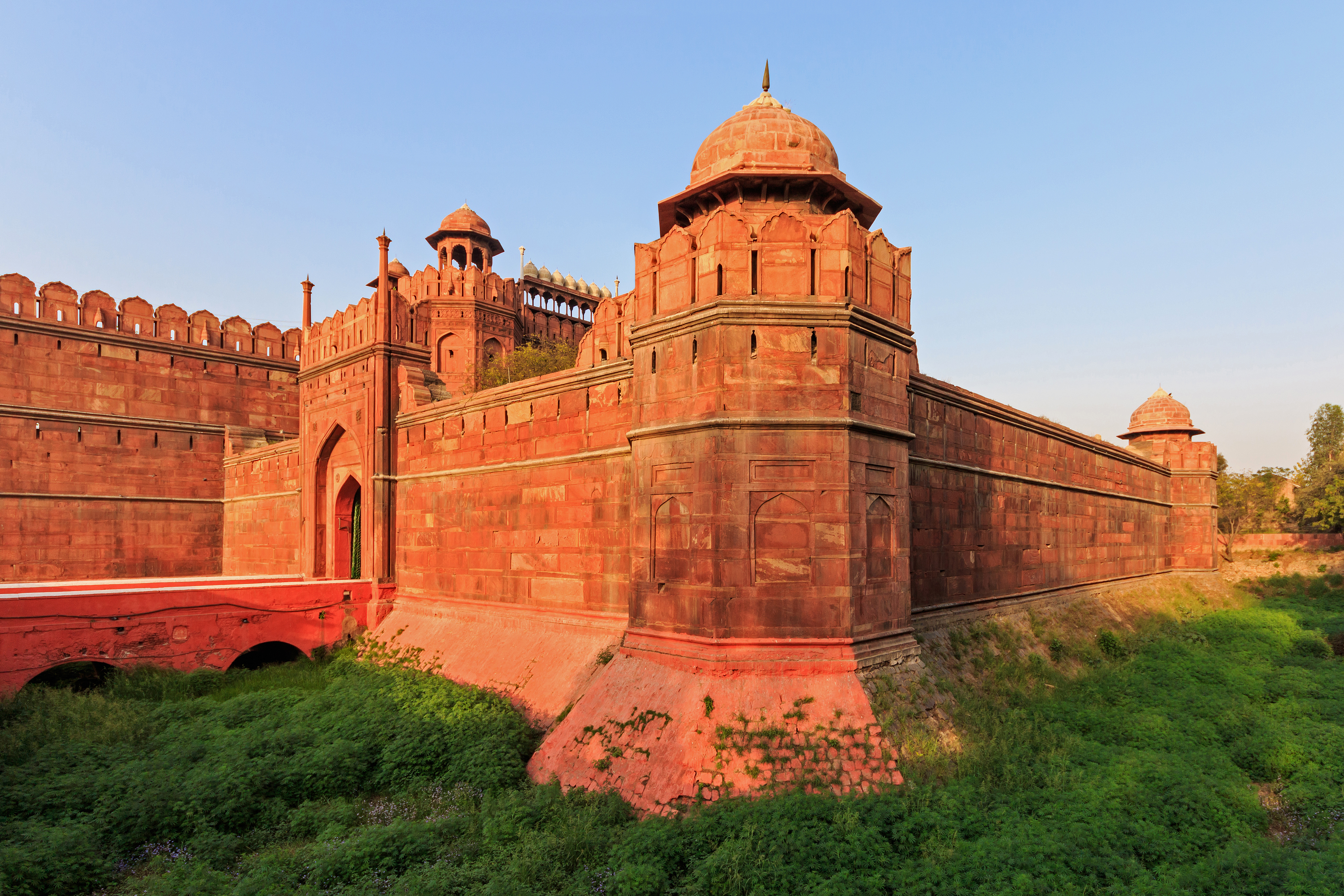
The Delhi Gate, almost identical in appearance to the Lahori Gate

The Lahori Gate, the primary entrance to the Red Fort, derives its name from its orientation towards the city of Lahore, which was once part of the Mughal Empire. During Aurangzeb's reign, the aesthetic appeal of the Lahori Gate was modified by the construction of a barbican, which Shah Jahan poetically described as "a veil drawn across the face of a beautiful woman." Since 1947, on every Indian Independence Day, the national flag is ceremonially unfurled, and the Prime Minister delivers a speech from the ramparts of the Red Fort.

=== Delhi Gate ===
The Delhi Gate serves as the southern public entrance to the Red Fort and shares a similar layout and appearance with the Lahori Gate. Flanking the gate are two life-sized stone elephants positioned to face each other.

=== Chhatta Chowk ===
Adjacent to the Lahori Gate is the Chhatta Chowk (or Meena Bazaar), where silk jewelry and other items for the imperial household were sold during the Mughal period. This market was earlier known as Bazaar-i-Musaqqaf or Chatta-bazaar (both meaning "roofed market"). The Lahori Gate, the main entrance to the Red Fort, opens into an outer court that intersects with a large north–south street. This street originally separated the fort's military functions, located to the west, from the palaces situated to the east. At its southern end lies the Delhi Gate.

=== Naubat Khana ===
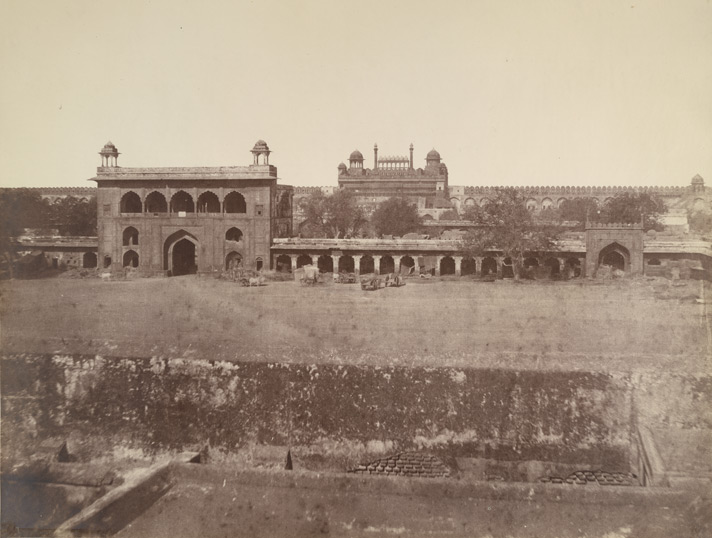
Naubat Khana and the courtyard before its demolition by the British, in an 1858 photograph

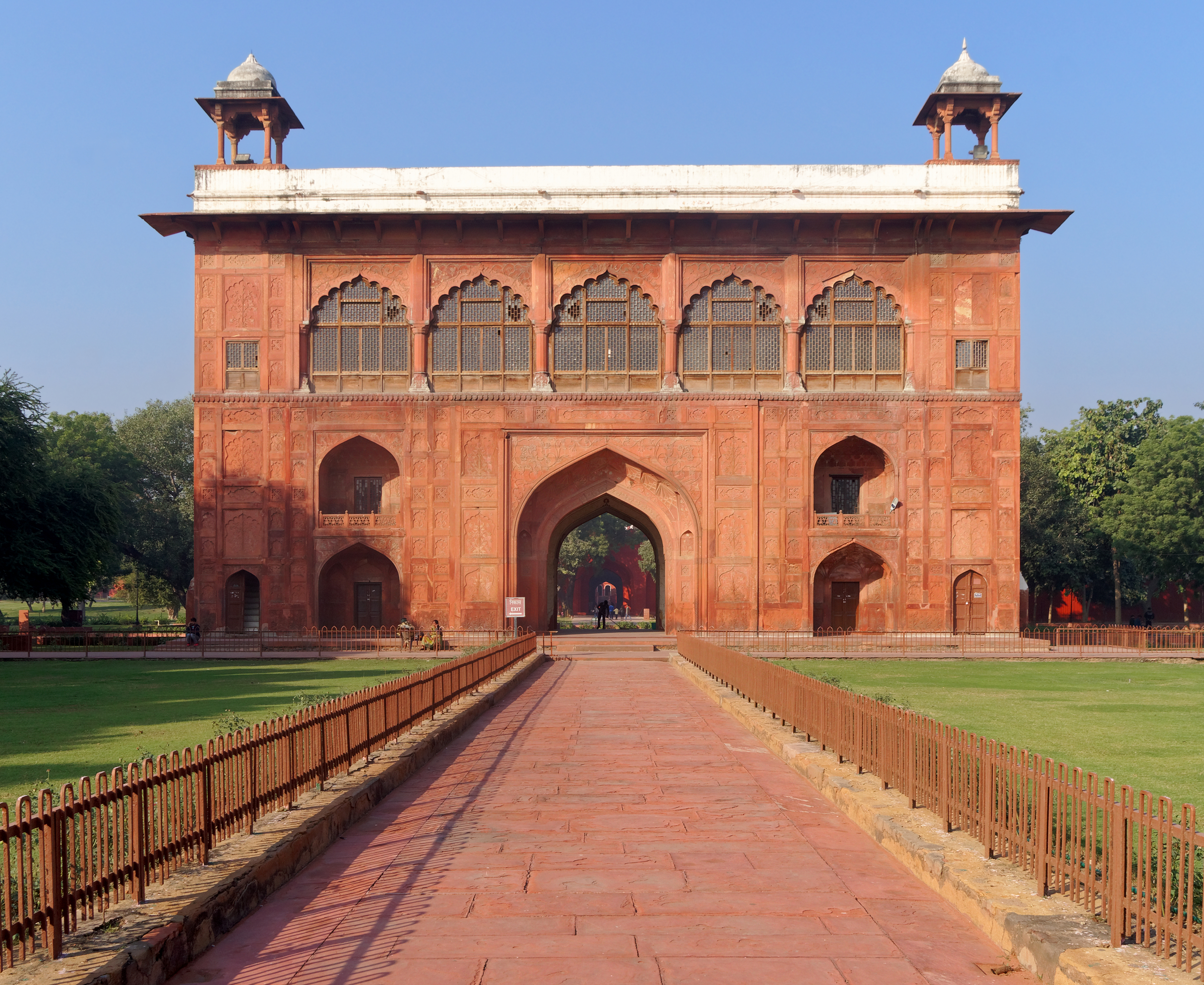
Naubat Khana today

In the east wall of the court stands the now-isolated Naubat Khana (Persian: "Waiting Hall"), also known as Nakkar Khana (drum house). Music was performed daily at scheduled times within the Red Fort, and it was required of everyone, except members of the royalty, to dismount during these performances. Later Mughal emperors Jahandar Shah (1712–1713) and Farrukhsiyar (1713–1719) are believed to have been murdered here. The Indian War Memorial Museum is located on the second floor. The vaulted arcade of the Chhatta Chowk ends in the center of the outer court, which measured 540 by 360 feet (160 m × 110 m). The side arcades and the central tank of the Red Fort were demolished following the 1857 rebellion.

=== Diwan-i-Aam ===
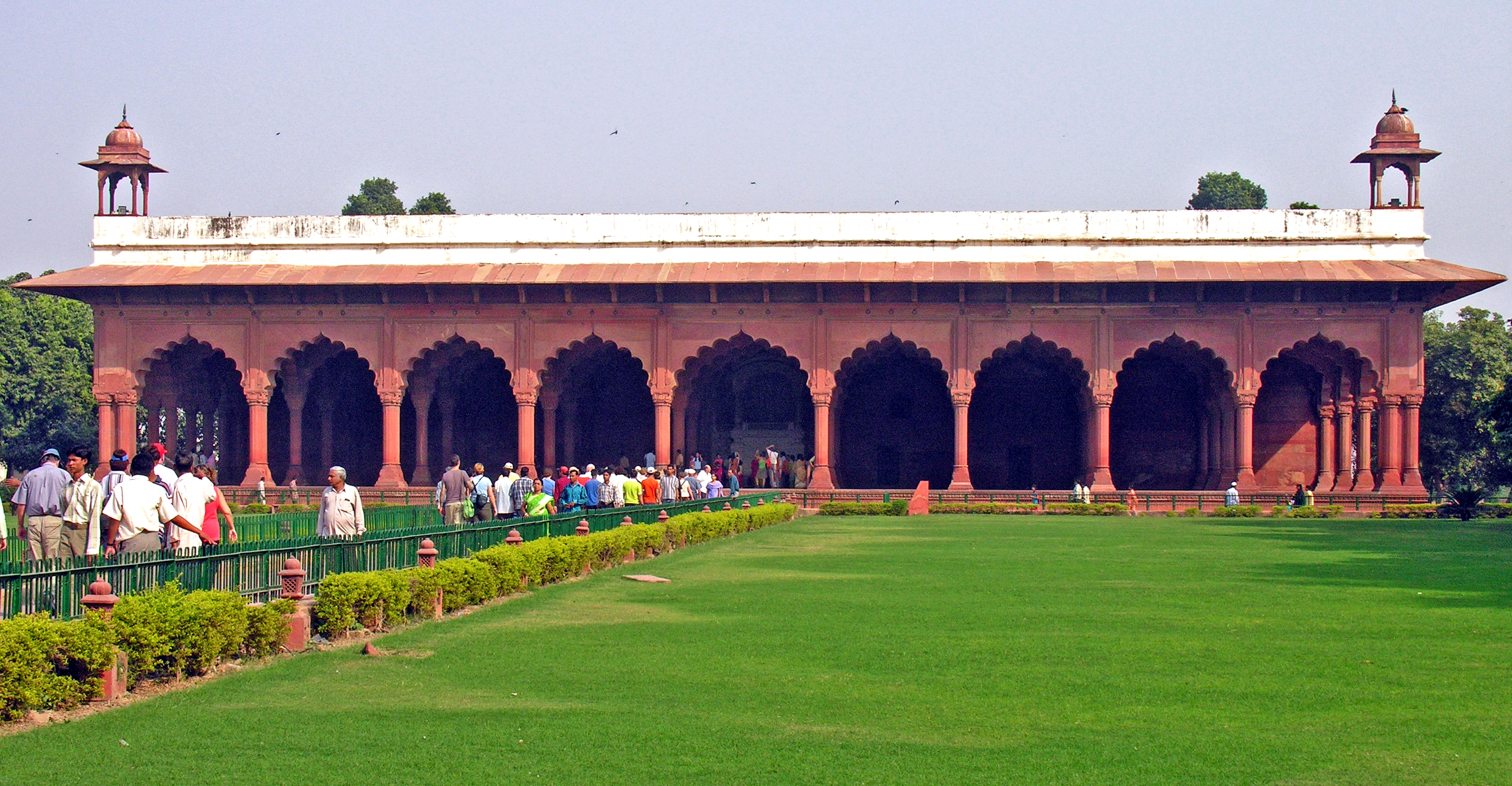
The Diwan-i-Aam today

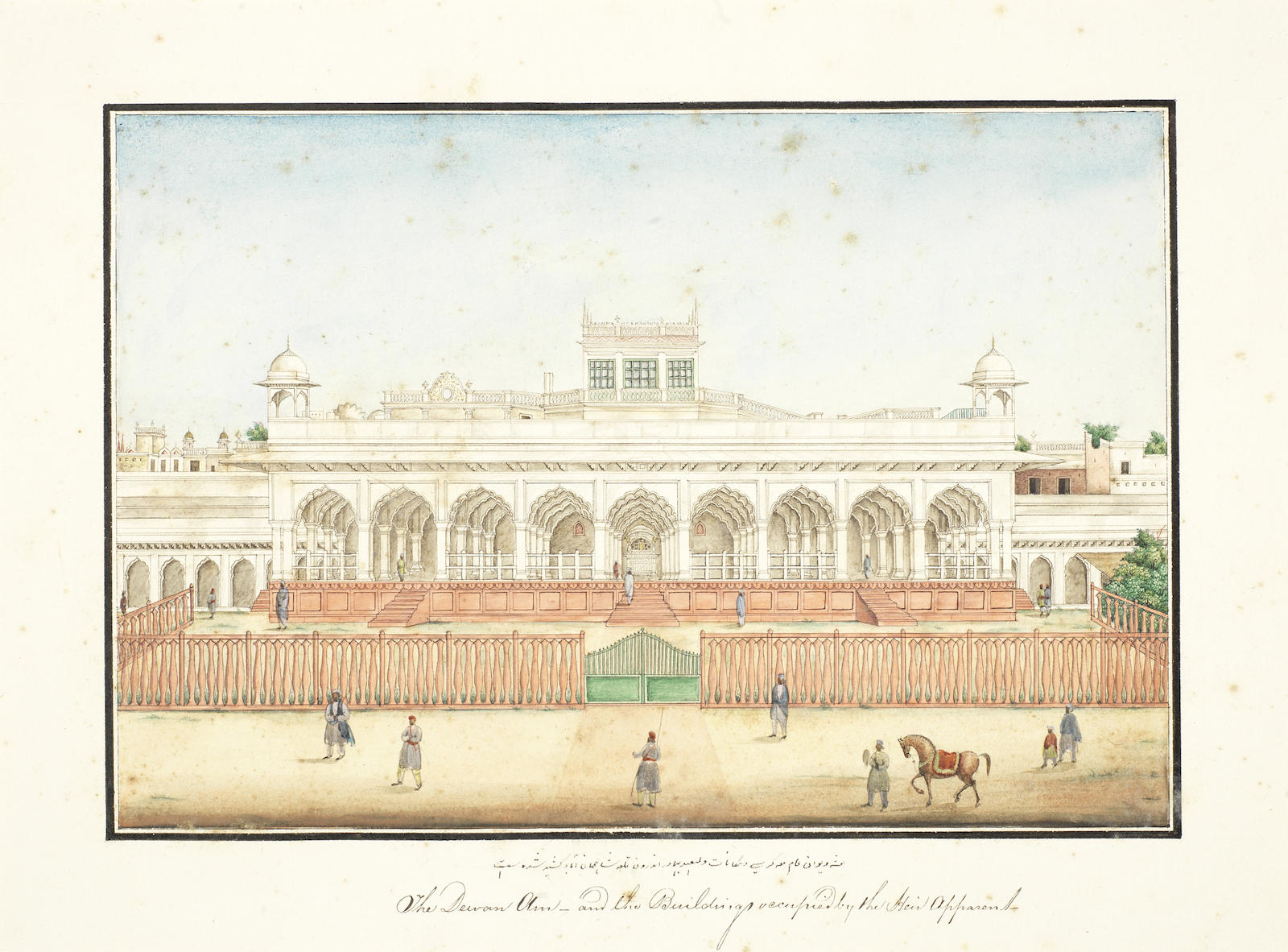
The Diwan-i-Aam in the mid-nineteenth century

The inner main court to which the Nakkar Khana led was 540 feet (160 m) wide and 420 feet (130 m) deep, surrounded by guarded galleries. On the far side is the Diwan-i-Aam, the Public Audience Hall. This venue was used to oversee official matters brought forth by commoners, including legal issues such as taxation, inheritance disputes, and matters related to awqaf (endowments).

The hall's columns and engrailed arches exhibit fine craftsmanship, and the hall was originally decorated with white chunam stucco. At the rear of the venue, in a raised recess, the emperor would grant audiences from the marble balcony (jharokha).

The Diwan-i-Aam was also used for state functions. The courtyard (mardana) behind it leads to the imperial apartments.

=== Mumtaz Mahal ===
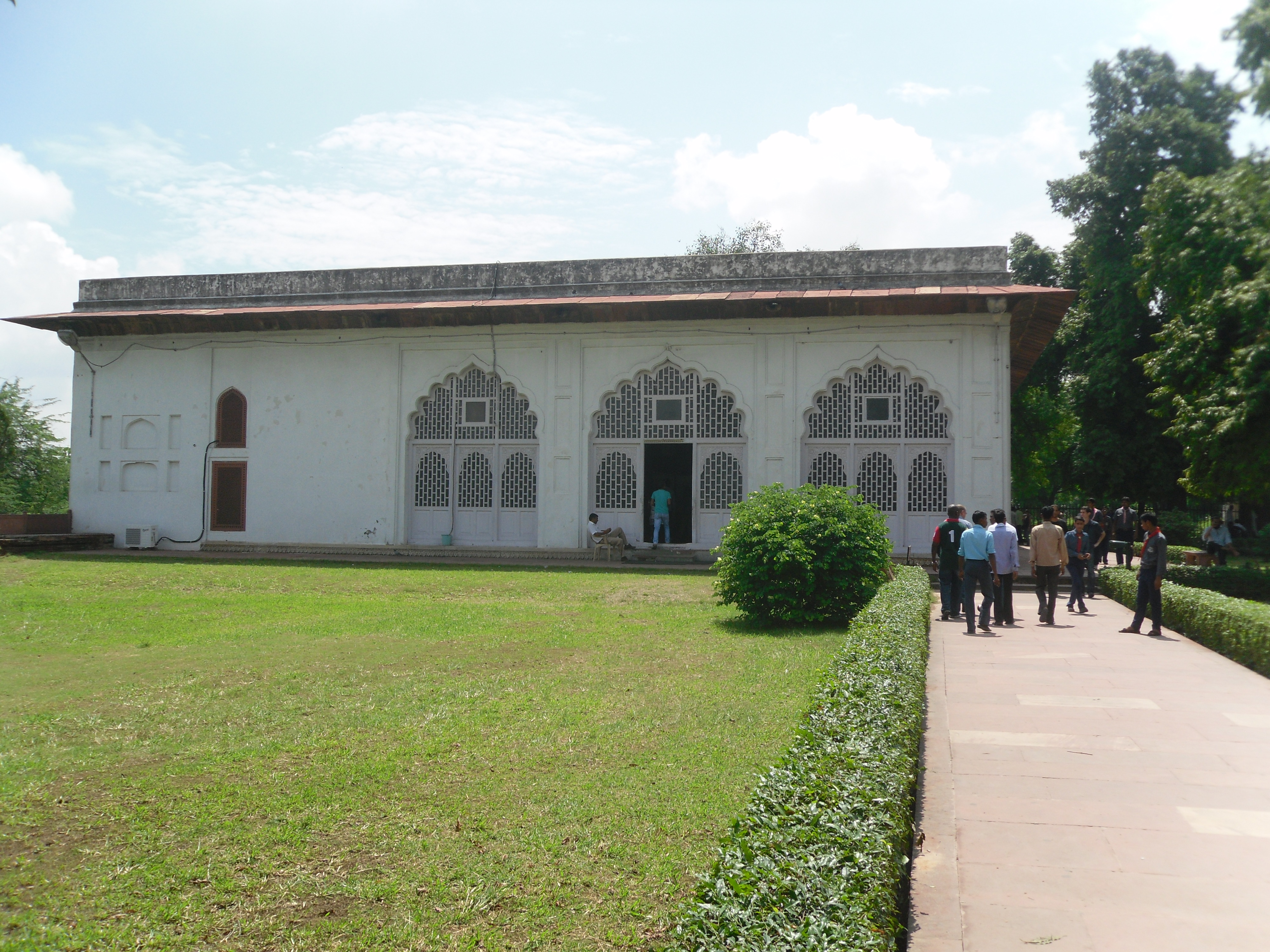
Mumtaz Mahal

The two southernmost pavilions of the palace are zenanas (women's quarters), consisting of the Mumtaz Mahal, built for Arjumand Banu Begum (Mumtaz Mahal), who was wife of the Mughal emperor Shah Jahan, and the larger Rang Mahal was designated a resort for royal women. The Mumtaz Mahal houses the Red Fort Archaeological Museum.

=== Rang Mahal ===
The Rang Mahal, meaning "Palace of Colors," served as the residence for the emperor's wives and mistresses. It derived its name from its vibrant paintings and intricate decorations, including a mosaic of mirrors. At its center lies a marble pool, which is fed by the Nahr-i-Bihisht ("River of Paradise").

=== Khas Mahal ===
The Khas Mahal was the emperor's apartment. It was cooled by the Nahr-i-Bihisht. Connected to it is the Muthamman Burj, an octagonal tower where the emperor appeared before the audience awaiting his presence at the riverbank. Such practices were common among most kings of the time, reflecting the prevailing norms and traditions of royal courts.

=== Diwan-i-Khas ===
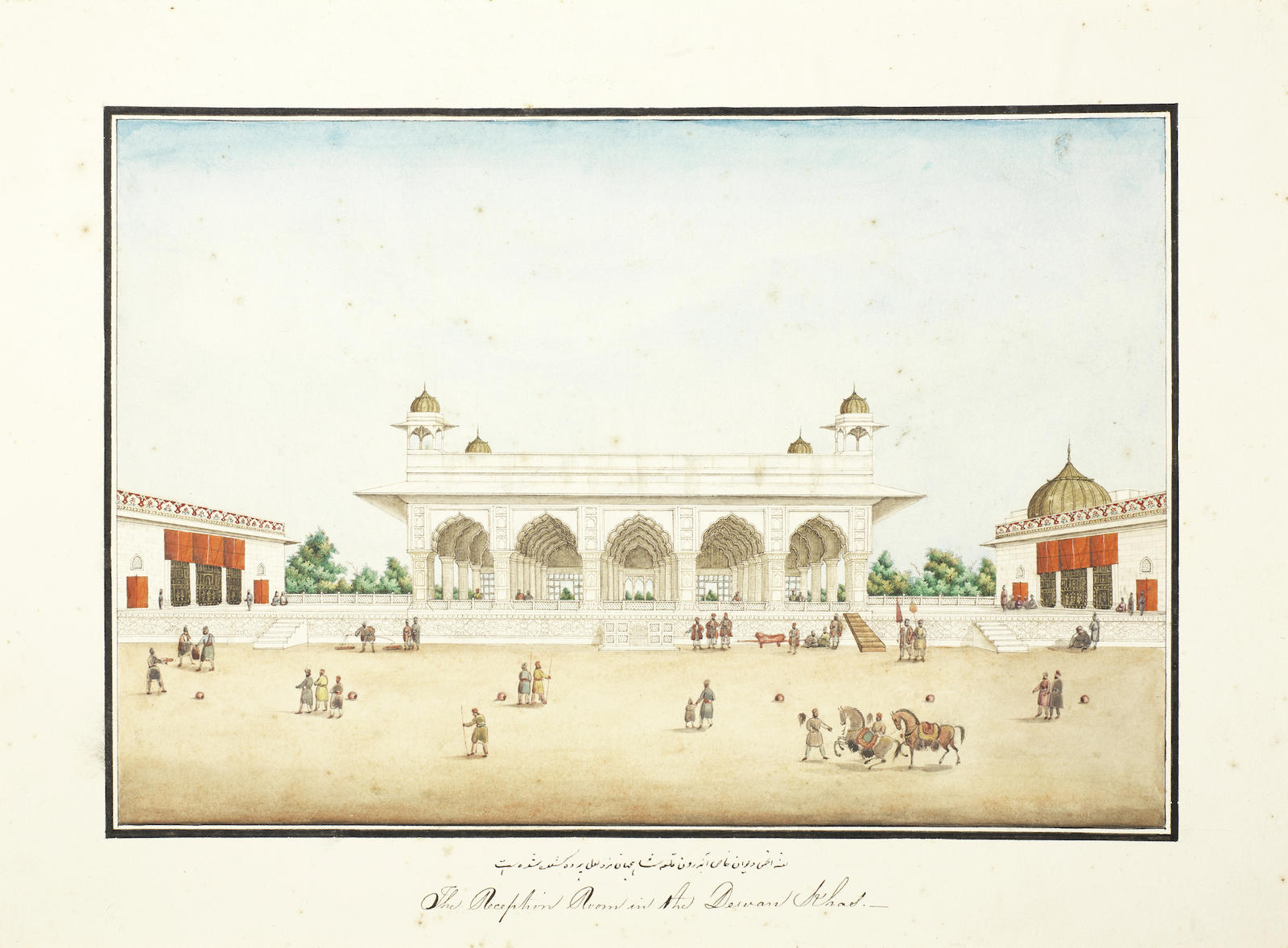
Diwan-i-Khas in the mid-nineteenth century

The Diwan-i-Khas, or Hall of Private Audience, was a space dedicated to addressing the official matters and requests of the nobility and members of the royal family. A gate located on the north side of the Diwan-i-Aam provided access to the innermost court of the palace, known as the Jalau Khana, as well as to the Diwan-i-Khas. It is constructed of white marble and inlaid with precious stones. The once-silver ceiling has been restored in wood. François Bernier described witnessing the jeweled Peacock Throne here in the 17th century. At both ends of the hall, over the two outer arches, is an inscription by the Persian poet Amir Khusrow:

If heaven can be on the face of the earth,

It is this, it is this, it is this.

— "World Heritage Site – Red Fort, Delhi; Diwan-i-Khas". Archaeological Survey of India.

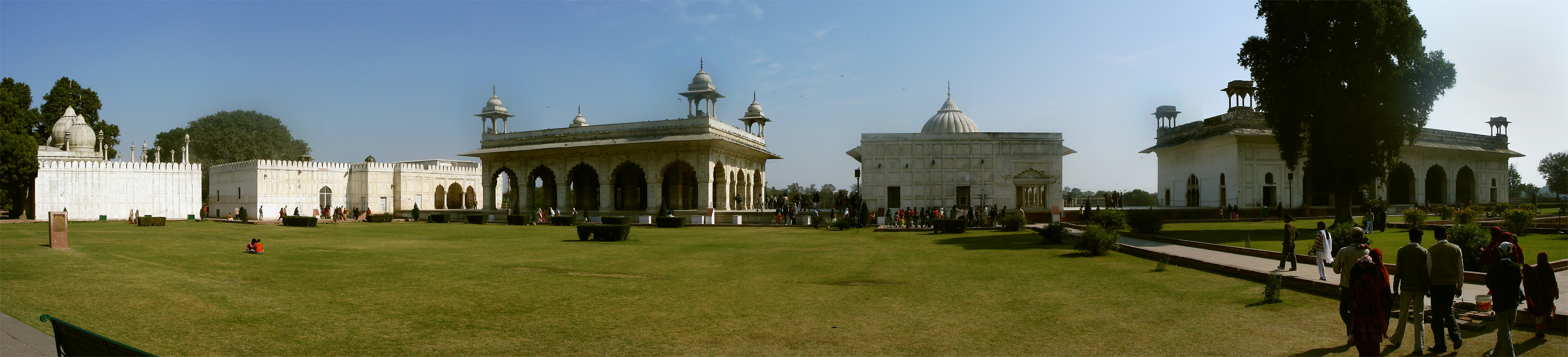
Panoramic view of the imperial enclosure.
From left: Moti Masjid, the hammam, Diwan-i-Khas, Khas Mahal and the Rang Mahal

=== Hammam ===
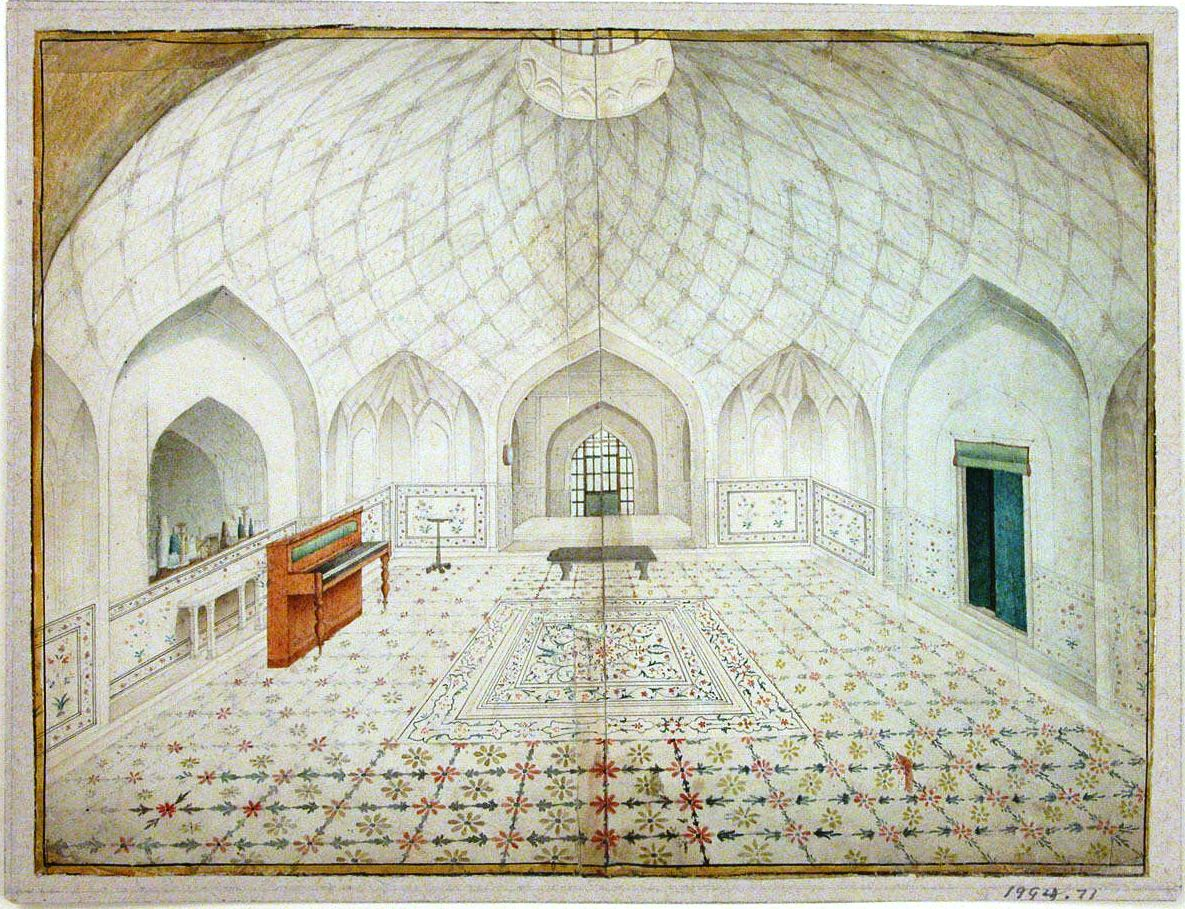
The hammam in the mid-nineteenth century

The hammam (Arabic: حمّام) were the imperial baths, consisting of three apartments separated by corridors and crowned with domes. The apartments are illuminated by a coloured glass skylight. The two rooms flanking the current entrance are believed to have served as bathing spaces for the royal children. The eastern apartment, featuring three fountain basins, was primarily used as a dressing room. Each room had a central fountain, and one included a marble reservoir embedded in the wall. According to legend, perfumed rose-water once flowed from the taps. The western apartment was designated for hot or vapor baths, with heating arrangements installed in its western wall.

=== Baoli ===
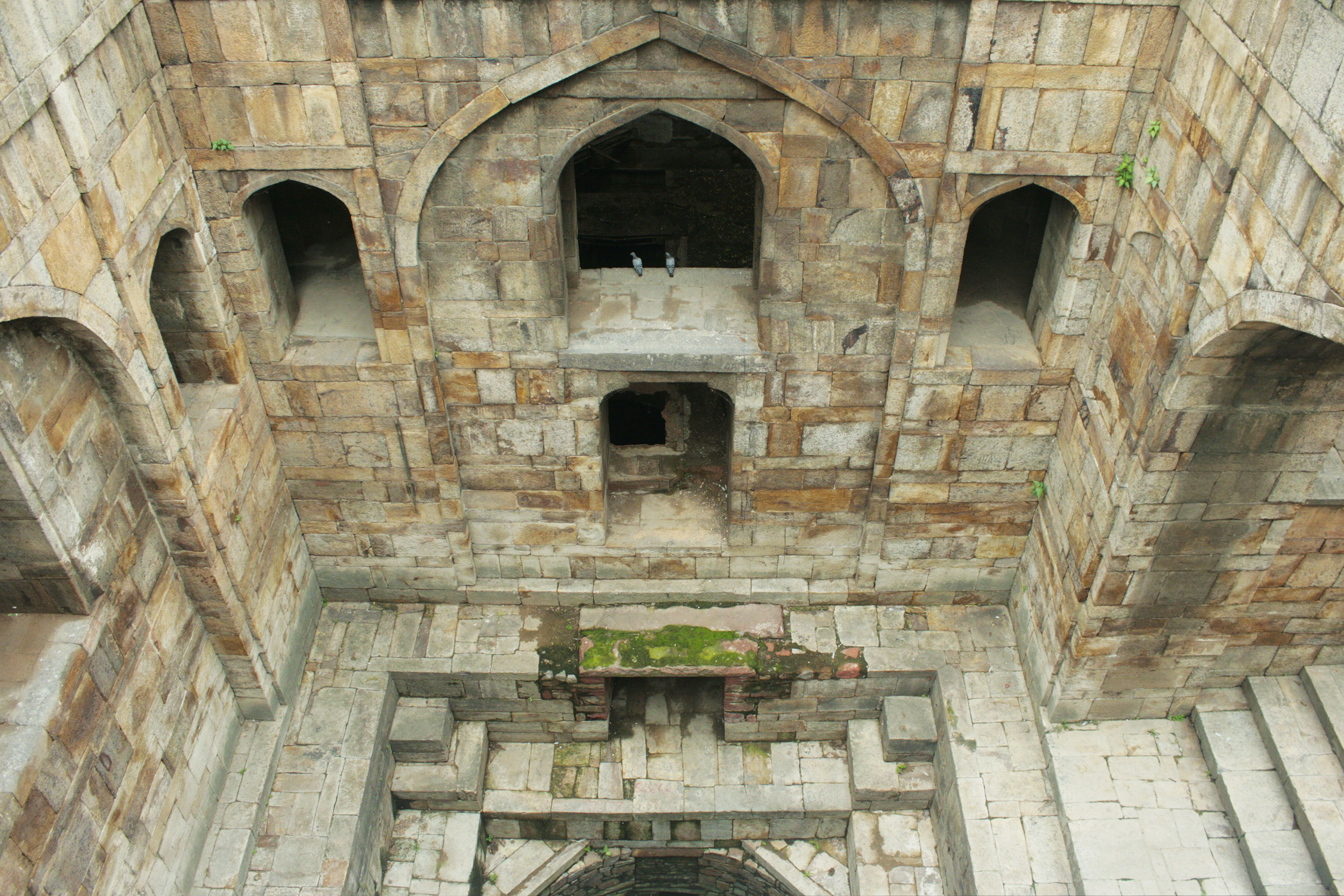
The baoli (step-well) at the Red Fort, Delhi

The baoli (step-well) is one of the few structures within the Red Fort that survived the widespread demolitions carried out by the British after the Indian Rebellion of 1857. Its chambers were repurposed as a prison and, during the Red Fort Trials of 1945–46, housed INA officers General Shah Nawaz Khan, Colonel Prem Kumar Sahgal, and Colonel Gurbaksh Singh Dhillon. The Red Fort baoli is distinctively designed, featuring two sets of staircases that descend to the well.

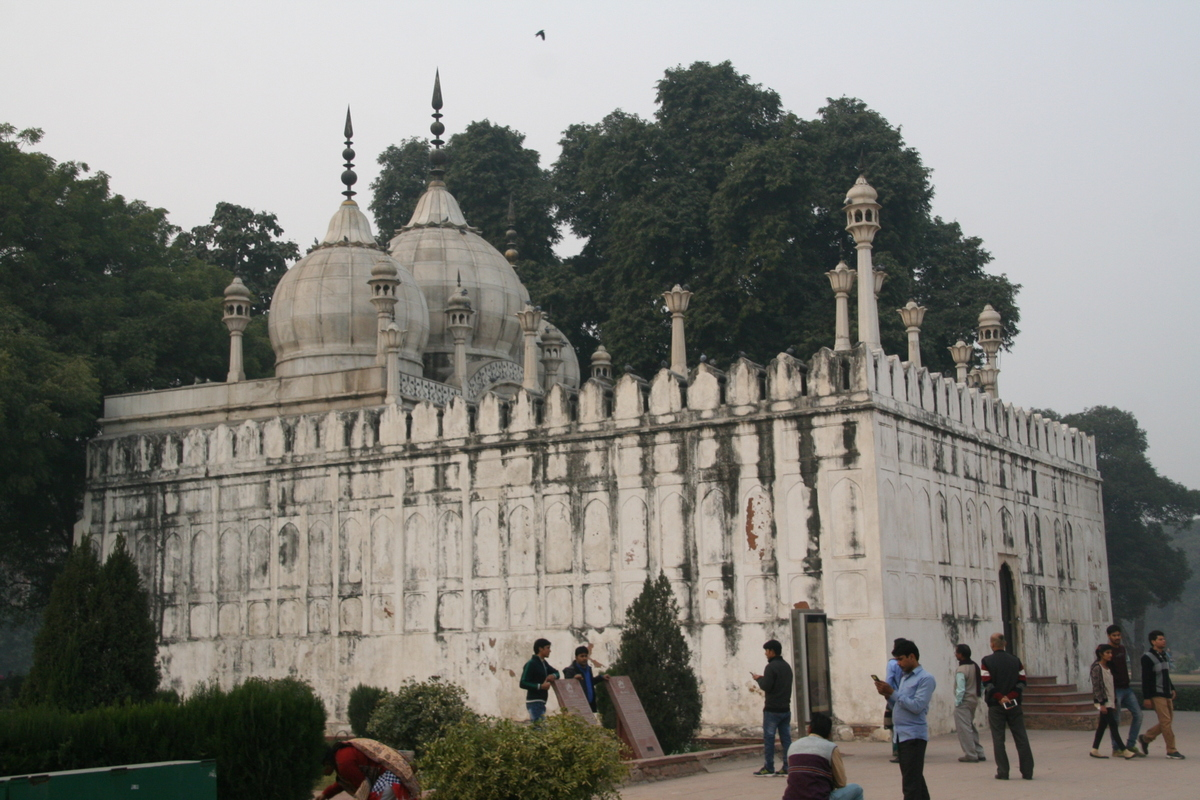
Moti Masjid

=== Moti Masjid ===
West of the hammam is the Moti Masjid, the Pearl Mosque. A later addition to the Red Fort, the mosque was built in 1659 as a private place of worship for Emperor Aurangzeb. This small, three-domed structure is crafted from white marble and features a three-arched screen that opens onto the courtyard.

=== Hira Mahal ===
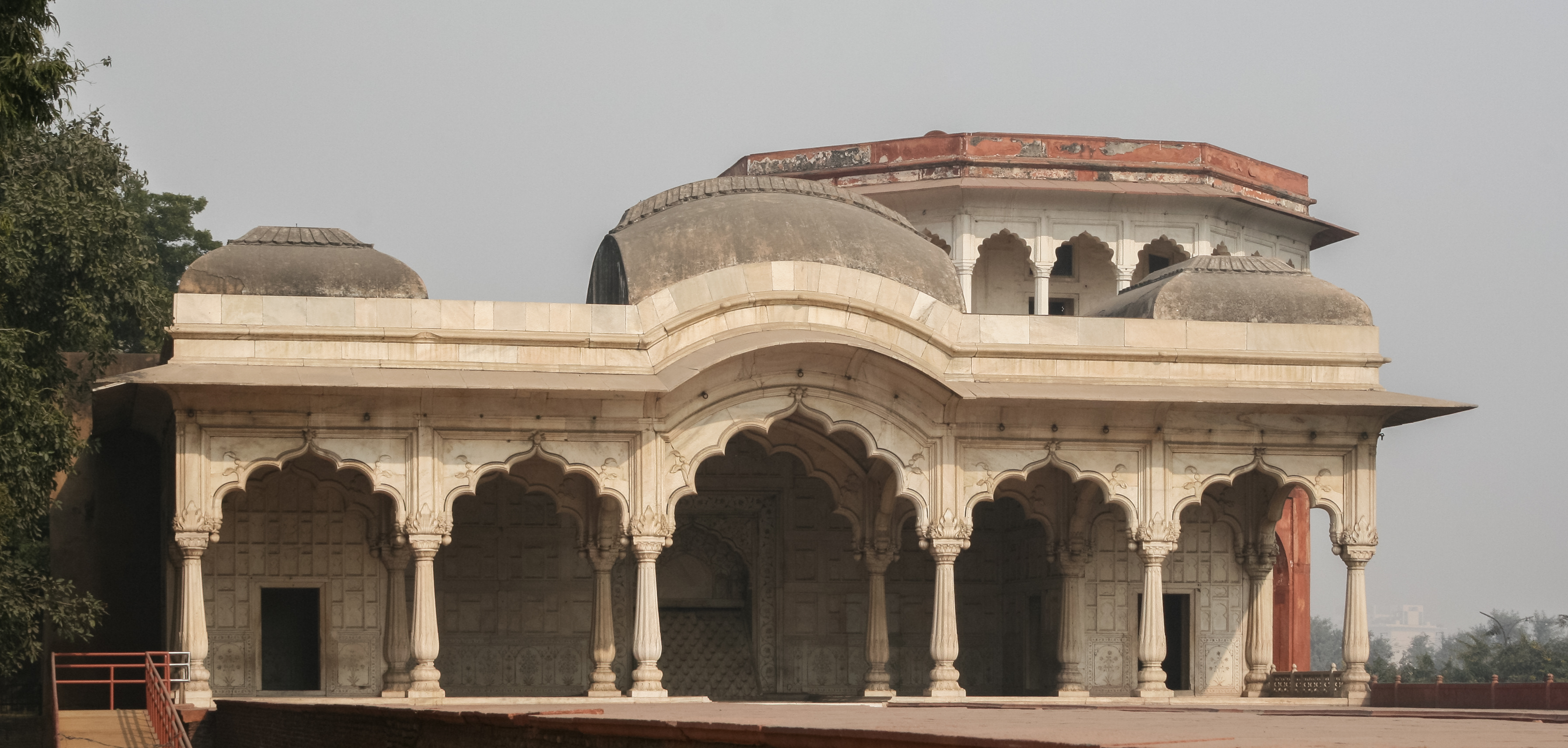
Shahi Burj and its pavilion

The Hira Mahal ("Diamond Palace") is a pavilion located on the southern edge of the Red Fort. It was constructed under the patronage of Bahadur Shah II and is situated at the end of the Hayat Baksh Garden. At the northern edge of the Red Fort stood the Moti Mahal, a twin building that was demolished during or shortly after the 1857 rebellion. The Shahi Burj was the emperor's main study; its name means "Emperor's Tower", and it originally featured a chhatri on top. Heavily damaged, the tower is undergoing reconstruction. Facing it is a marble pavilion added by Emperor Aurangzeb.

=== Hayat Bakhsh Bagh ===
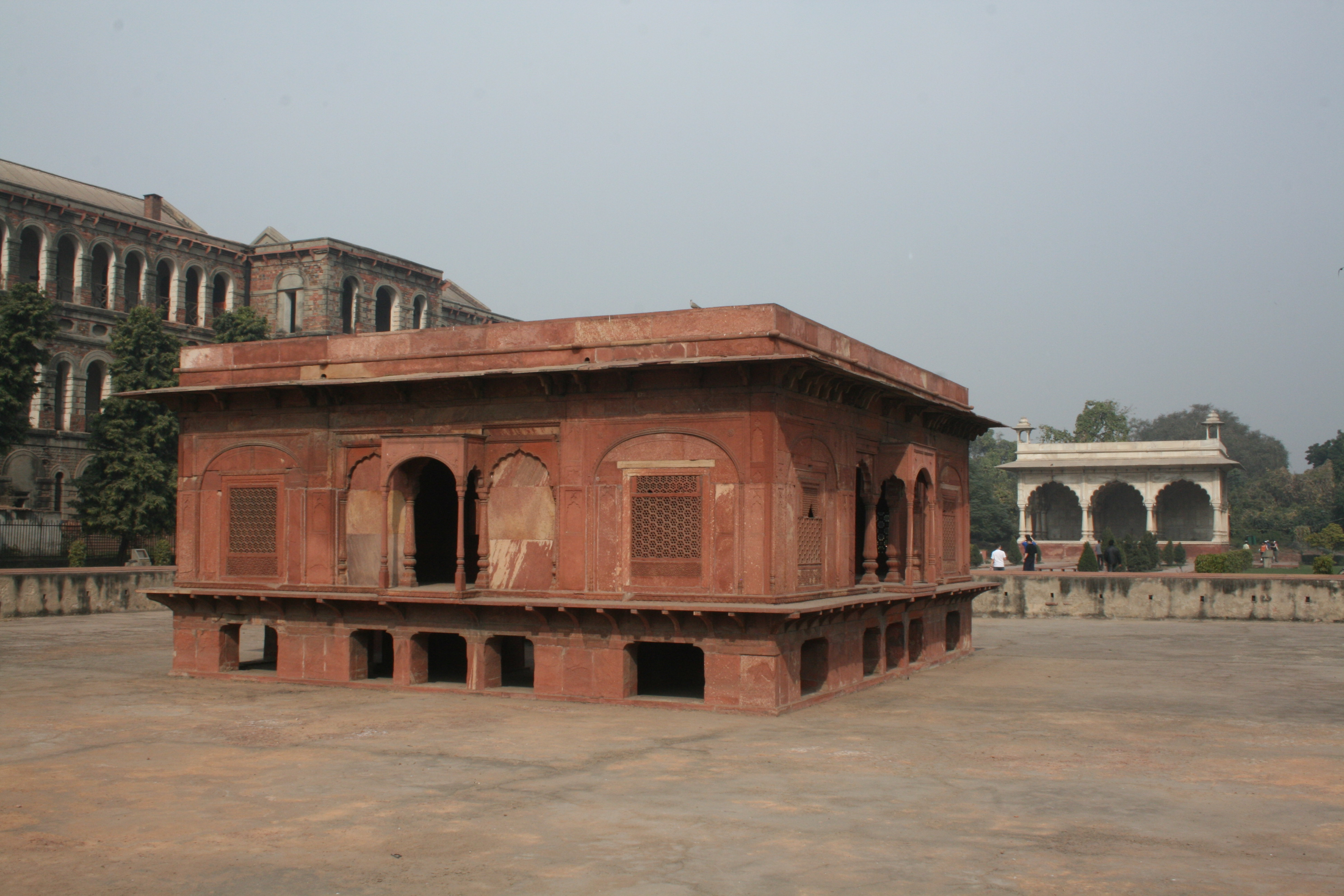
Zafar Mahal and the white Sawan/Bhadon pavilions in the background

The Hayat Bakhsh Bagh (Persian: حیات بخش باغ, lit. 'Life-Bestowing Garden') is located in the northeast part of the complex. At each end of the canal within the Red Fort is a white marble pavilion, named the Sawan and Bhadon Pavilions, after the Hindu months of Sawan and Bhadon. At the center of the reservoir stands the Zafar Mahal, an eponymous red sandstone structure added around 1842 by Bahadur Shah Zafar.

Smaller gardens, such as the Mehtab Bagh (Moonlight Garden), once existed to the west of the main garden but were demolished during the construction of British barracks. There are plans to restore the gardens. Beyond these structures, a road to the north leads to an arched bridge connecting to the Salimgarh Fort.

=== Princes' quarter ===
To the north of the Hayat Bakhsh Bagh and the Shahi Burj lies the quarter of the imperial princes, which was used by members of the Mughal royal family. Much of this area was demolished by British forces after the 1857 rebellion, with one of the palaces being repurposed into a tea house for soldiers.

== See also ==
- Capital forts/palaces in Delhi, oldest first
  - Purana Qila
  - Anangpur, by Anangpal I of Tomara dynasty (r. 736-1152 CE)
  - Qila Rai Pithora
    - Lal Kot, by Tomara dynasty (1152-1177 CE) as capital
    - Qila Rai Pithora, the Lal Kot expended by Prithviraj Chauhan (also called Rai Pithora, r. 1177–92 CE) of Chauhan dynasty
  - Siri Fort, by Alauddin Khalji (r. 1296–1316), second ruler of Khalji Dynasty
  - Tughlaqabad Fort, by Ghiyassudin Tughluq (r. 1320-25 CE) of Tughluq dynasty
  - Feroz Shah Kotla, by Feroz Shah Tughluq (r. 1351-88 CE) of Tughluq dynasty
  - Salimgarh Fort, in 1546 CE by Salim Shah Suri (r. 1545-54 CE), son of Sher Shah Suri
  - Red fort 8n Delhi, built in 1639-48 CE by Mughal emperor Shah Jahan when he moved his capital from Agra to Delhi
  - Rashtrapati Bhavan, built in 1912–29 by colonial British raj
- History of Delhi
  - Paleolithic sites in & around Tughlaqabad Fort
  - Stepwells of Delhi
- Other Mughal Red Forts
  - Agra Fort
  - Lahore Fort
