= Khirki Mosque =

Former mosque in South Delhi, India

- Arabic: مسجد خيركي; Hindi: खिड़की मस्जिद, दिल्ली
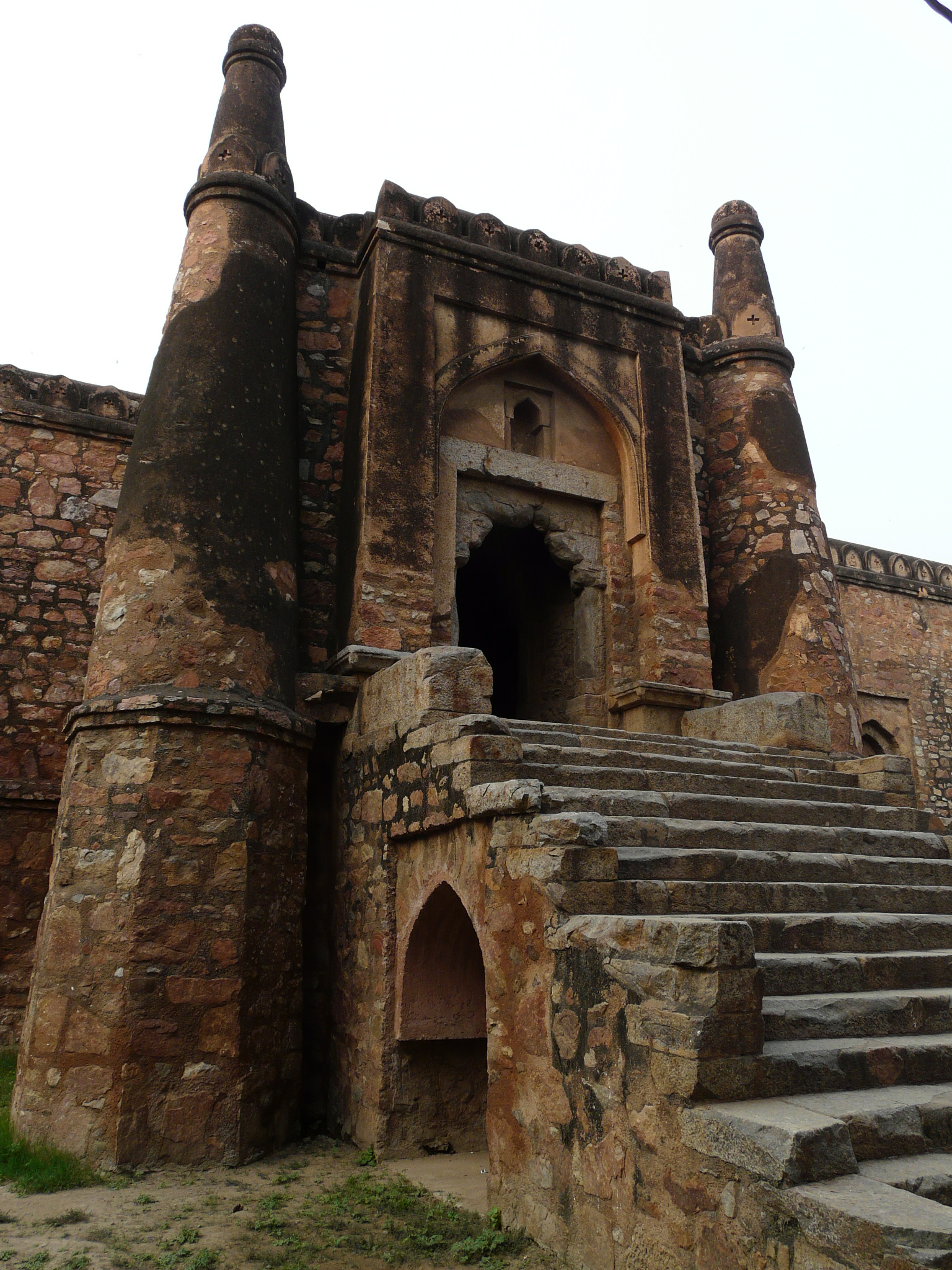
- The south entrance to the former mosque, in 2008

- Location of the former mosque in Delhi

Religion
- Affiliation: Islam (former)
- Ecclesiastical or organizational status: Mosque (former)
- Status: Inactive (partial ruinious state)

Location
- Location: Khirki Village, Satpula, South Delhi, Delhi NCT
- Country: India
- Interactive map of Khirki Mosque
- Administration: Archaeological Survey of India
- Coordinates: 28°31′53″N 77°13′11″E

Architecture
- Type: Mosque architecture
- Style: Tughluqid; Indo-Islamic
- Founder: Khan-i-Jahan Junan Shah
- Groundbreaking: 1351
- Completed: 1354; 672 years ago

Specifications
- Length: 52 m (171 ft)
- Width: 52 m (171 ft)
- Interior area: 87 m^{2} (940 sq ft)
- Dome: 81
- Minaret: Four
- Materials: Rubble masonry

Monument of National Importance
- Official name: Khirki Masjid (Khirkee Masjid)
- Reference no.: N-DL-85

The Khirki Mosque (Arabic: مسجد خيركي; Hindi: खिड़की मस्जिद, दिल्ली) is a former mosque, now in partial ruins, located in Khirki Village, near Satpula, in South Delhi, India. The mosque was built by Khan-i-Jahan Junan Shah, the prime minister of Feroz Shah Tughlaq (1351–1388) of the Tughlaq Dynasty. The former mosque can be approached from Satpula or the seven–arched bridge on the edge of southern wall of Jahanpanah.

The former mosque is a Monument of National Importance, administered by the Archaeological Survey of India. While construction within hundred metres of monuments designated as such are explicitly outlawed by the Ancient Monuments and Archaeological Sites and Remains Act, 1958, the mosque remains completely circumscribed by contemporaneous urban sprawl.

== Etymology ==
The word 'Khirki' prefixed to mosque is an Urdu word that means "window" and hence, the mosque is also called "The Mosque of Windows".

== History ==
Khan-i-Jahan Junan Shah and Feroz Shah Tughlaq were intensely committed towards building architectural monuments. Together, they planned and built several tombs, forts and mosques. Telangani in particular, was credited with building seven monuments of unique designs.

Constructed in the Jahapanah city, the Khirki Mosque is a novel cross–axial mosque in Tughluqid architectural style. There are no specific inscriptions on the mosque on its construction date, though the name of the builder is inscribed on the eastern gate of the mosque as 'Khan-e-Jahan Junaan Shah'. Therefore, in the absence of "epigraphic and literary" evidence (though one recent web reference mentions 1375 and another 1380) for its provenance, a research study conjectured the year of building by comparing with many other large monuments of this period. It is dated between 1351 and 1354 when Feroz Shah Tughlaq, during his stay in Jahapanah, ordered this mosque to be built as "his pious inaugural contribution to the Capital".

== Architecture ==
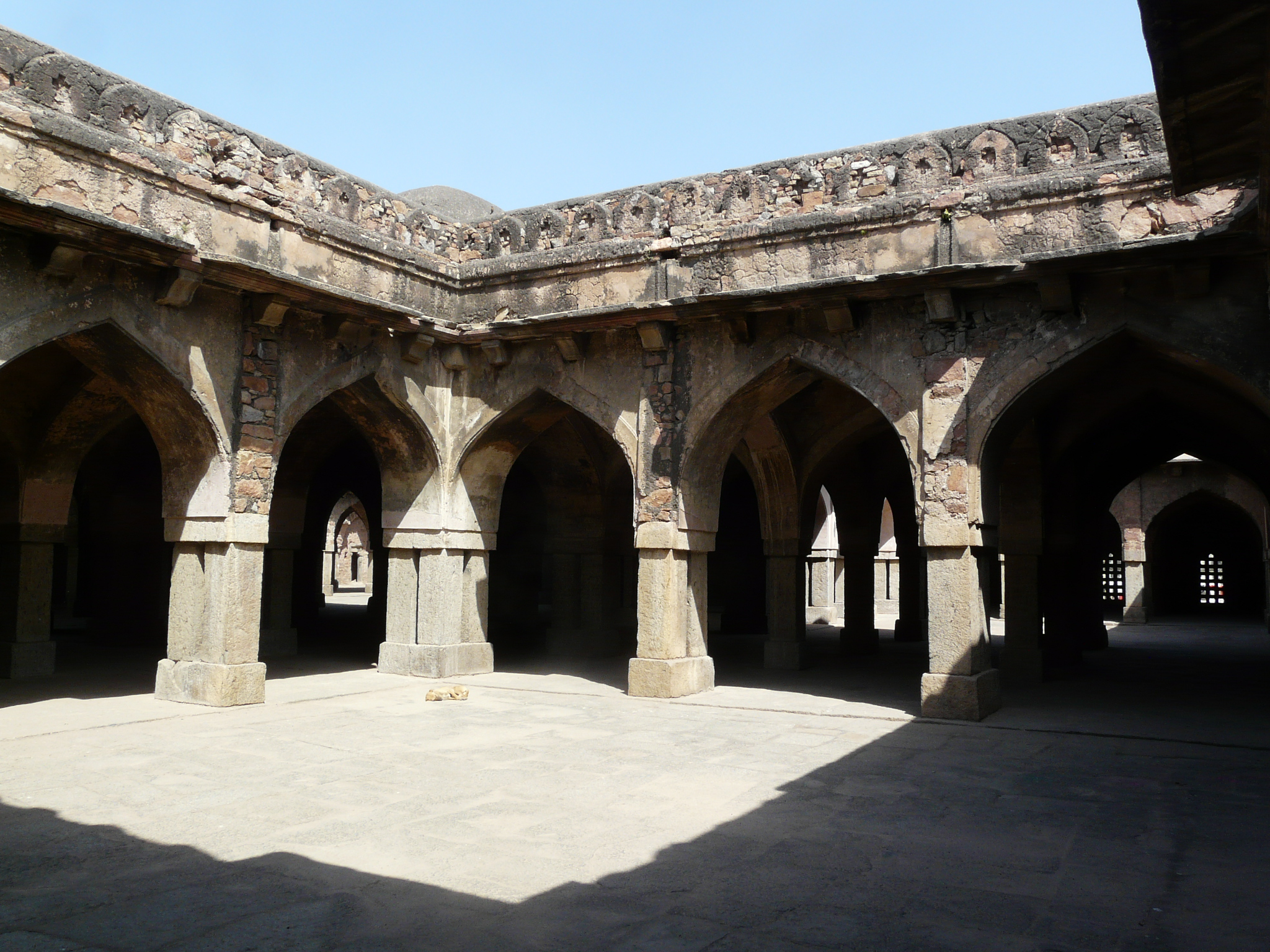
View of interior courtyard

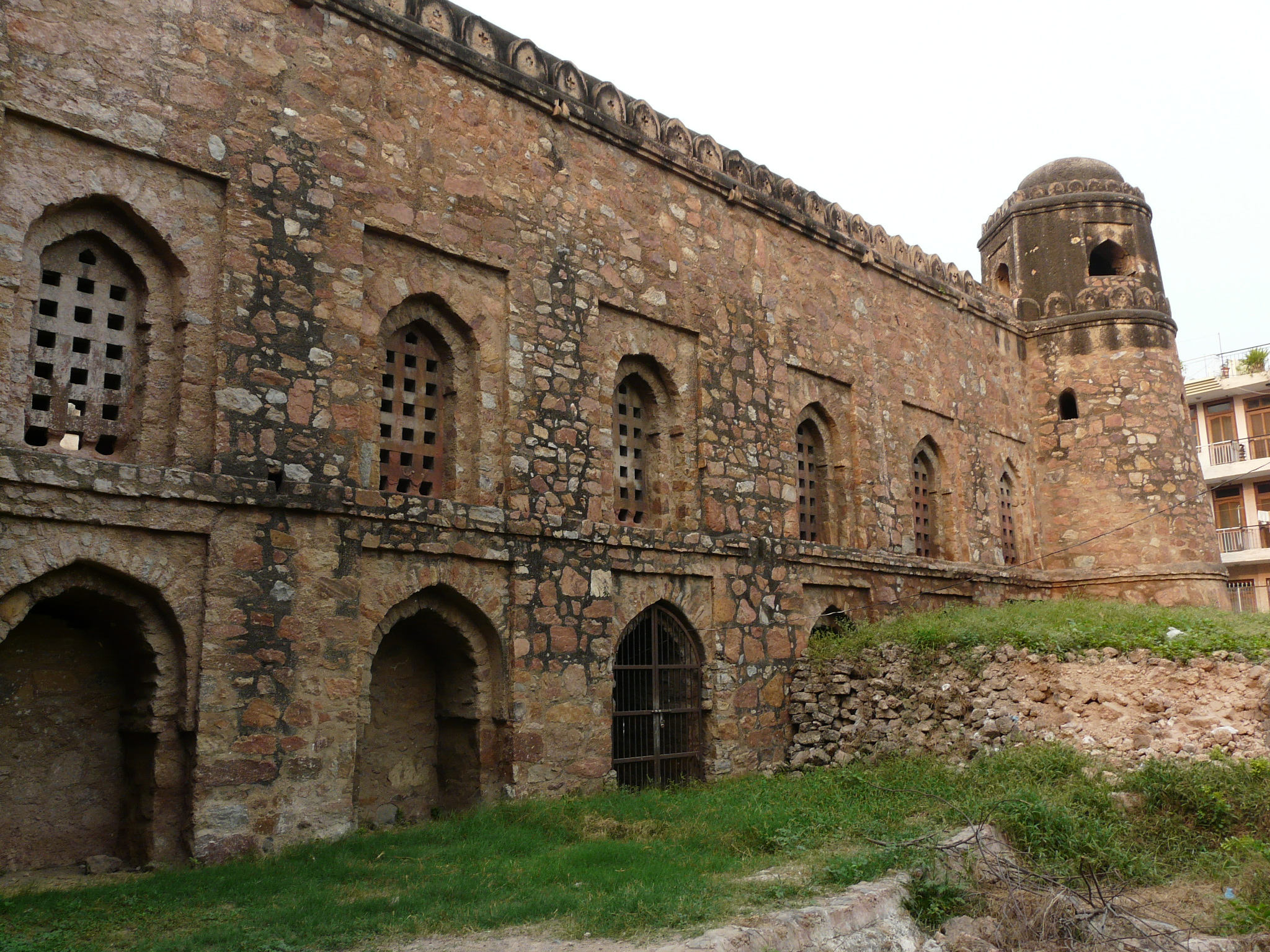
Exterior of the mosque with latticed Khirkis on the second floor

The former mosque has a 52-by-52-metre (171 by 171 ft) square plan in an area of 87 square metres (940 ft^{2}). It is raised on a plinth of 3 metres (9.8 ft). There are four open courtyards (square in size of 9.14 metres (30.0 ft) on each side) encircled by arcades built with 180 square structural columns and 60 pilasters, which run in north–south direction and divides into aisles. The open courtyards are the source of light and ventilation to the internal prayer spaces.

The roof is partitioned into 25 squares of equal size with nine small domes in each square (totalling to 81 domes) and alternated by 12 flat roofs to cover the roof. The four courtyards provide light and ventilation. The four corners of the mosque are adorned with minarets with three protruding gateways, one in the middle of each face, with tapering turrets flanking each gate. The southern gate, with imposing steps at the main entrance, exhibits a combination of arch and trabeated construction. It has an ornamental rectilinear frame. The turrets flanking the southern and northern gates are circular in shape; the articulation on these gives them a three storied appearance.

The main gate, which leads to the qibla on the western wall, has a projecting mihrab. Above the vaulted first floor cells, ubiquitous arch windows (carved out of stone guard) with perforated screens or jalis or tracery, known as "Khirkis", are seen on the second floor. However, the foyer in front of the mihrab is not well lighted since light from the latticed windows on the second floor do not penetrate this space. The approach to the roof of the former mosque is from the east gate, and the view from the roof leaves a lasting impression of the geometrical design of the mosque.

The former mosque's walls are of rubble masonry construction with plastered surface on the outside. The interior walls are bland but provided with traditional carved stone screens. The symmetrically designed admirable mosque is considered one of “the finest architectural compositions of the Sultanate history.” It was considered Firuz Shah's architectural benefaction.

The importance of the Khirki Mosque's architectural elegance was considered a precursor to the intensely metaphorical Mughal architecture (1526–1857), with the Lodhi period's (1451–1526) architecture – the Delhi Sultanate's last dynasty – marking the transition.

== Restoration ==
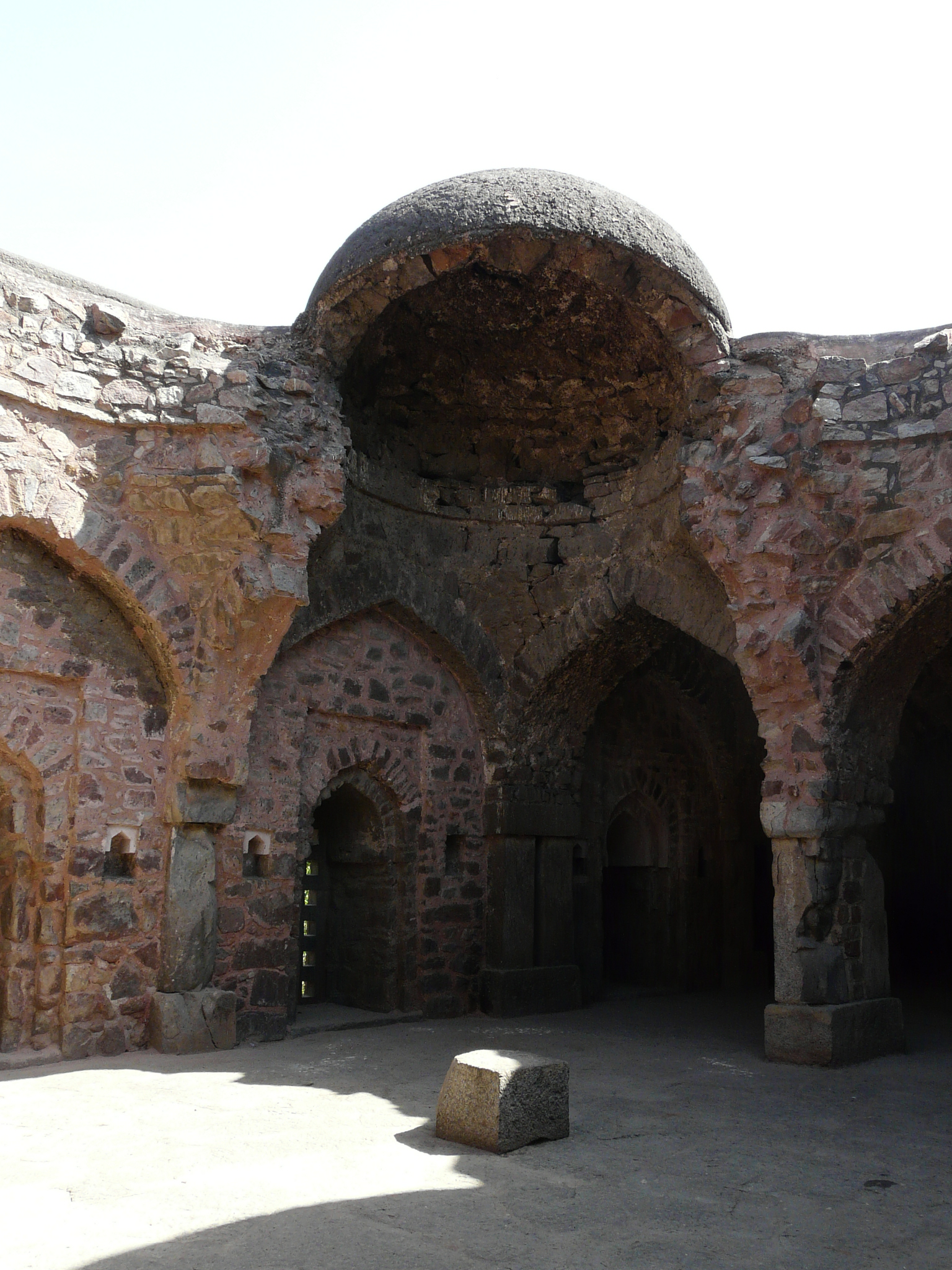
A collapsed corner of the roof

Over the years, a few domes on the north–east side of the mosque collapsed and a few walls were in a dilapidated state. The roof was on the verge of collapse in many places. The Delhi chapter of Indian National Trust for Art and Cultural Heritage (INTACH) categorized the monument as "Grade A" in terms of archeological value. It was one of the 43 monuments identified by the Archaeological Survey of India (ASI) for restoration before the 2010 Commonwealth Games. As of 2009, some conservation works were initiated by ASI inside the former mosque.

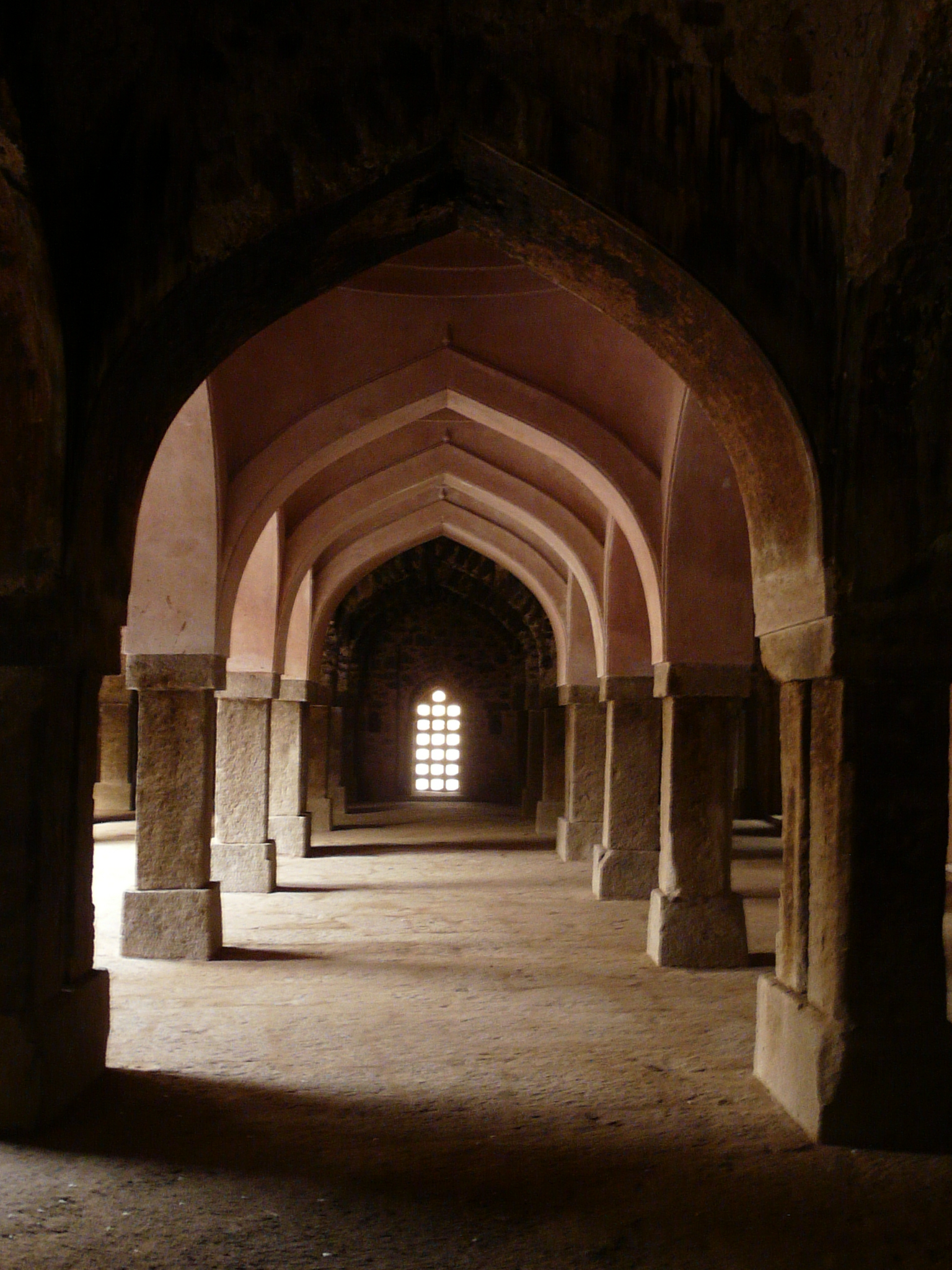
Interior walls and arches restored by conservation action by ASI; the pink colour is distinct

Delhi heritage experts were concerned by the status of the restoration works of the Khirki Mosque done by the ASI, which converted it into a pink monument (pictured) as distinct from the lime mortar of ancient times. They pressed the ASI to re–examine the restoration procedures adopted by them for conservation works of Mughal-era monuments. ASI suspended the restoration works of the mosque and held a workshop on the "use of lime mortar in ancient times" to educate their staff on proper restoration of Mughal monuments.

In 2018, during archaeological works, the ASI uncovered a large number of copper coins on the site of the mosque. Further restoration works were announced in June 2023, and completed in December 2024.

== Visitor information ==
Access to the mosque is through the narrow lanes of Khirki village near Saket, in South Delhi. The mosque is on the other side of Press Enclave Marg from the Saket Citywalk Mall. The nearest metro station is Malviya Nagar. The mosque can be easily glimpsed down the narrow lanes off this main road. It is 4 km (2.5 mi) east of Qutub Minar and 13 km (8.1 mi) south of Connaught Place. The remnants of the fourth city of Delhi, Jahanpanah, the raised Bijai Mandal Platform and the Begampur mosque with its variety of domes are other attractions close to the mosque. Nearer to the mosque, there is a bridge structure of the time called the Satpula (means seven bridges), part of the Jahanpanah boundary walls. It is a sluice weir with seven arched main spans, with two additional bays at a higher level on the flanks.

== Gallery ==
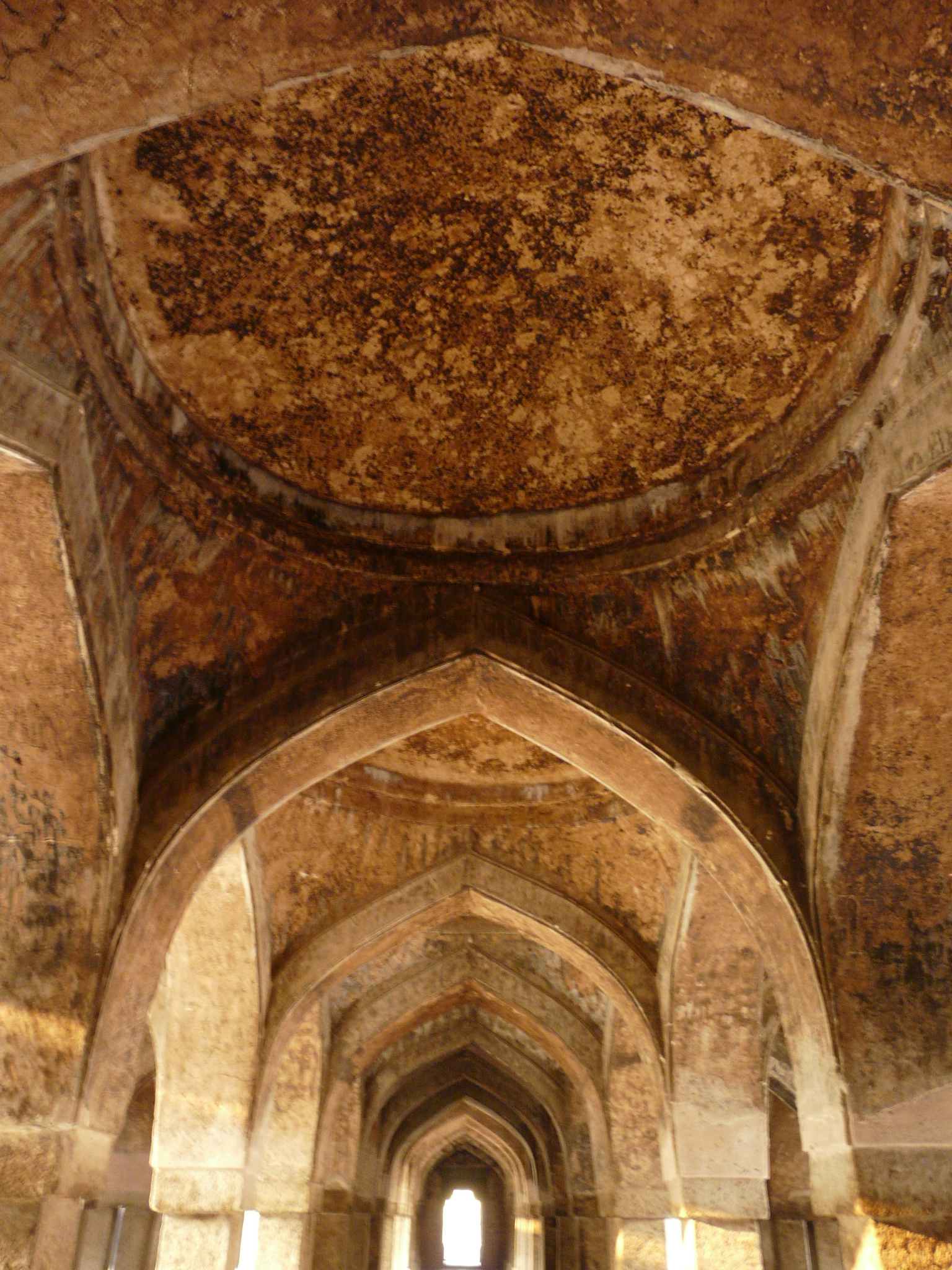
Ceiling detail

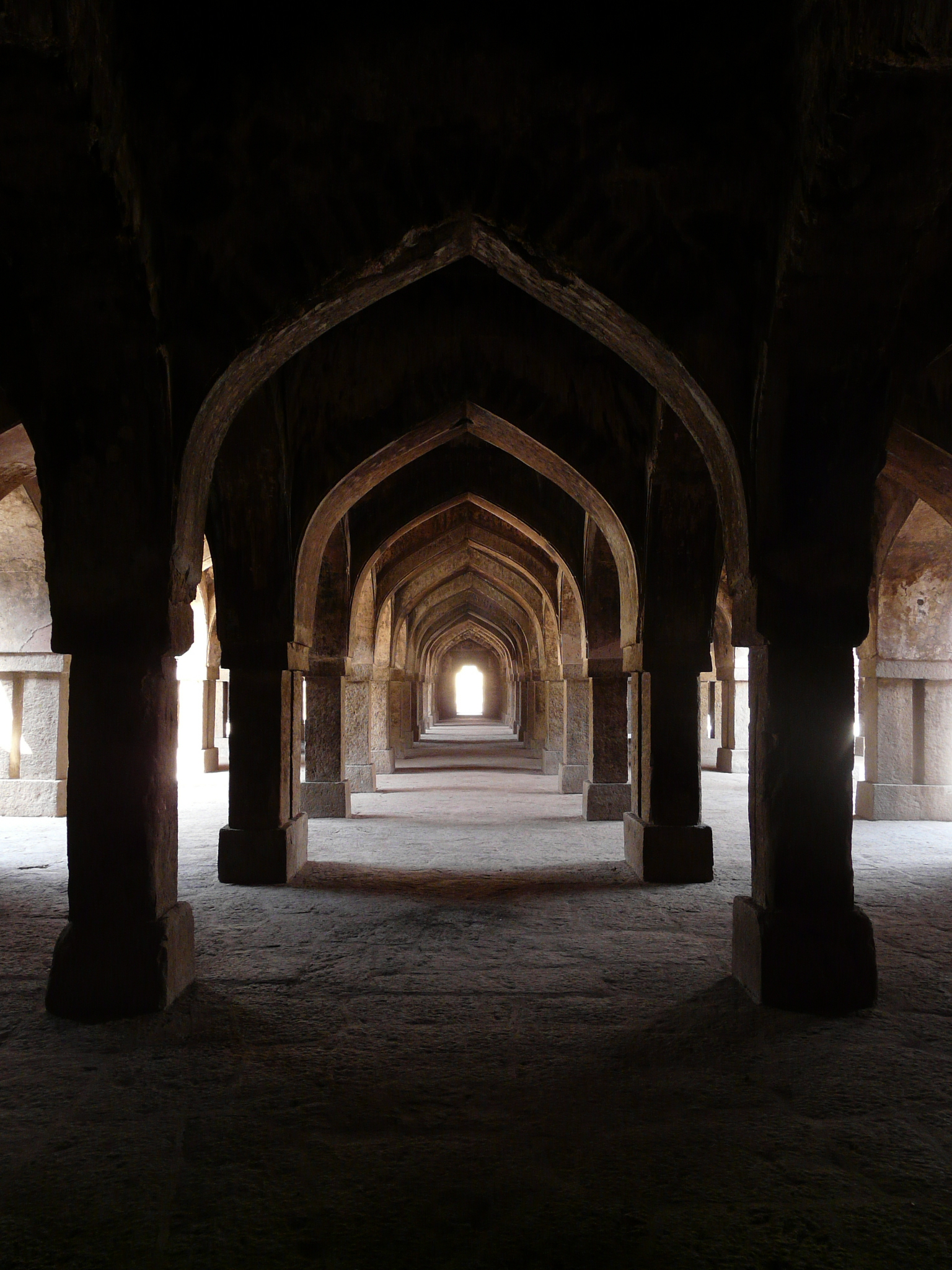
Central arcade

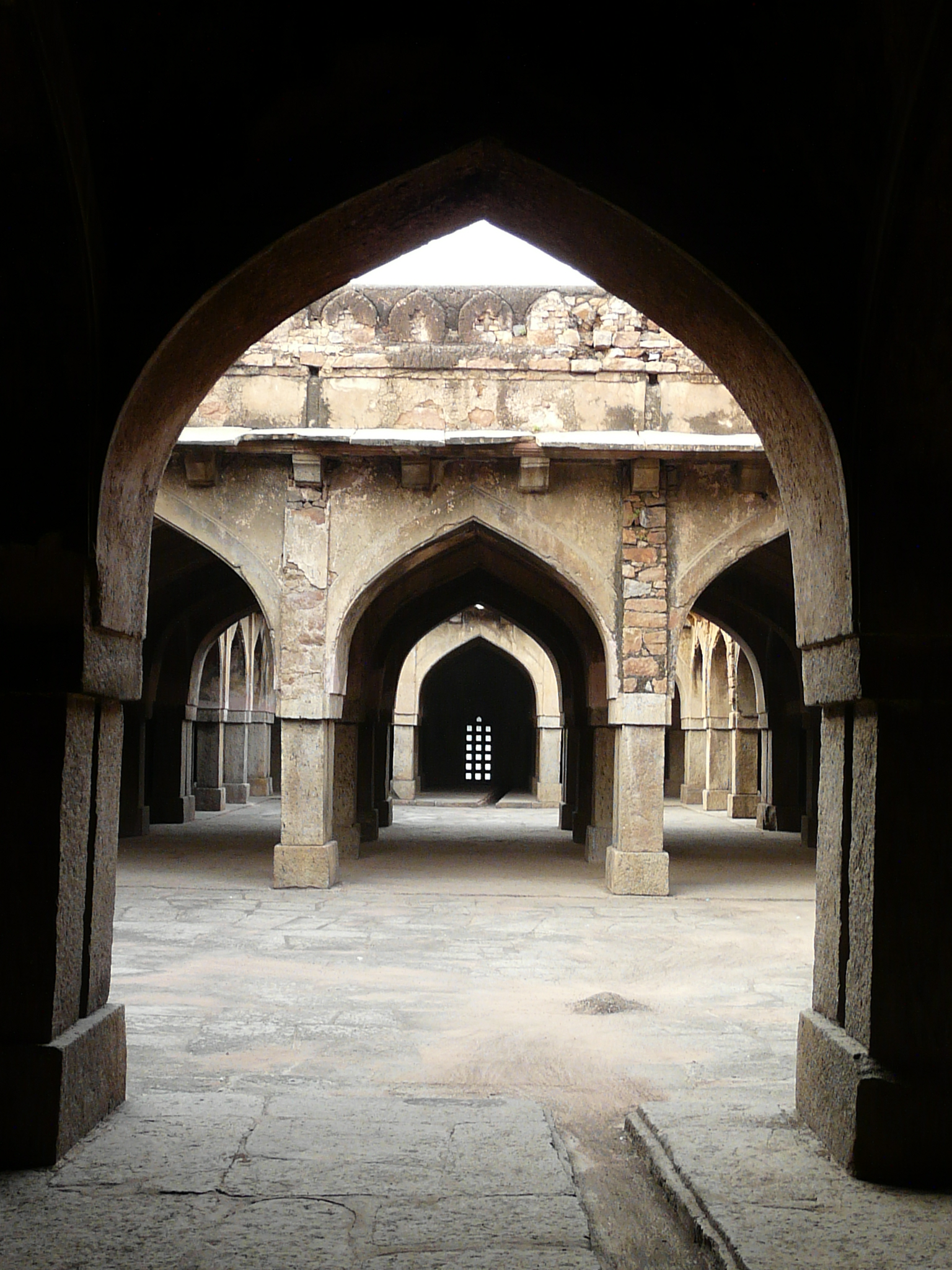
Courtyards and passages

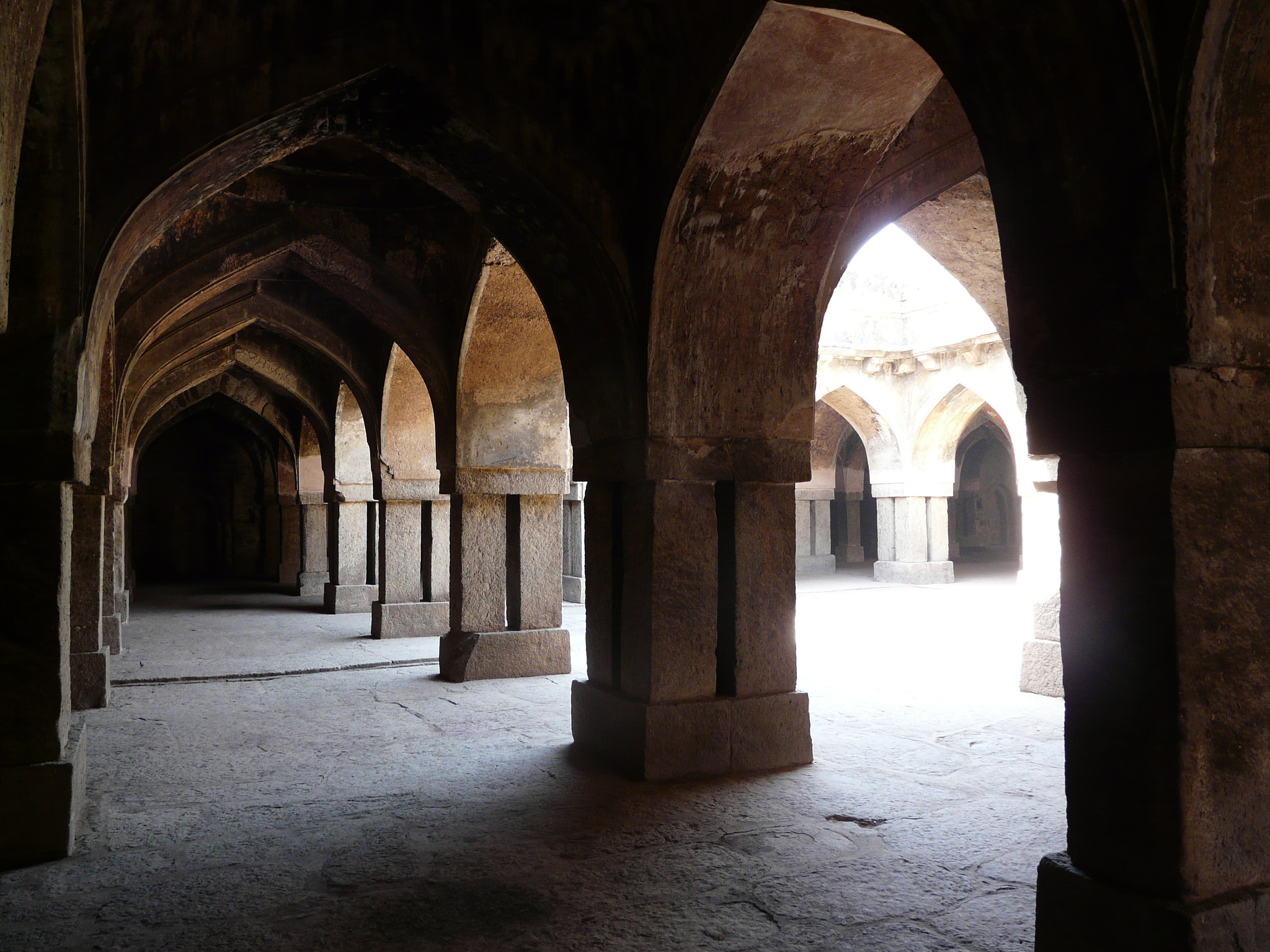
Arcade around the courtyard

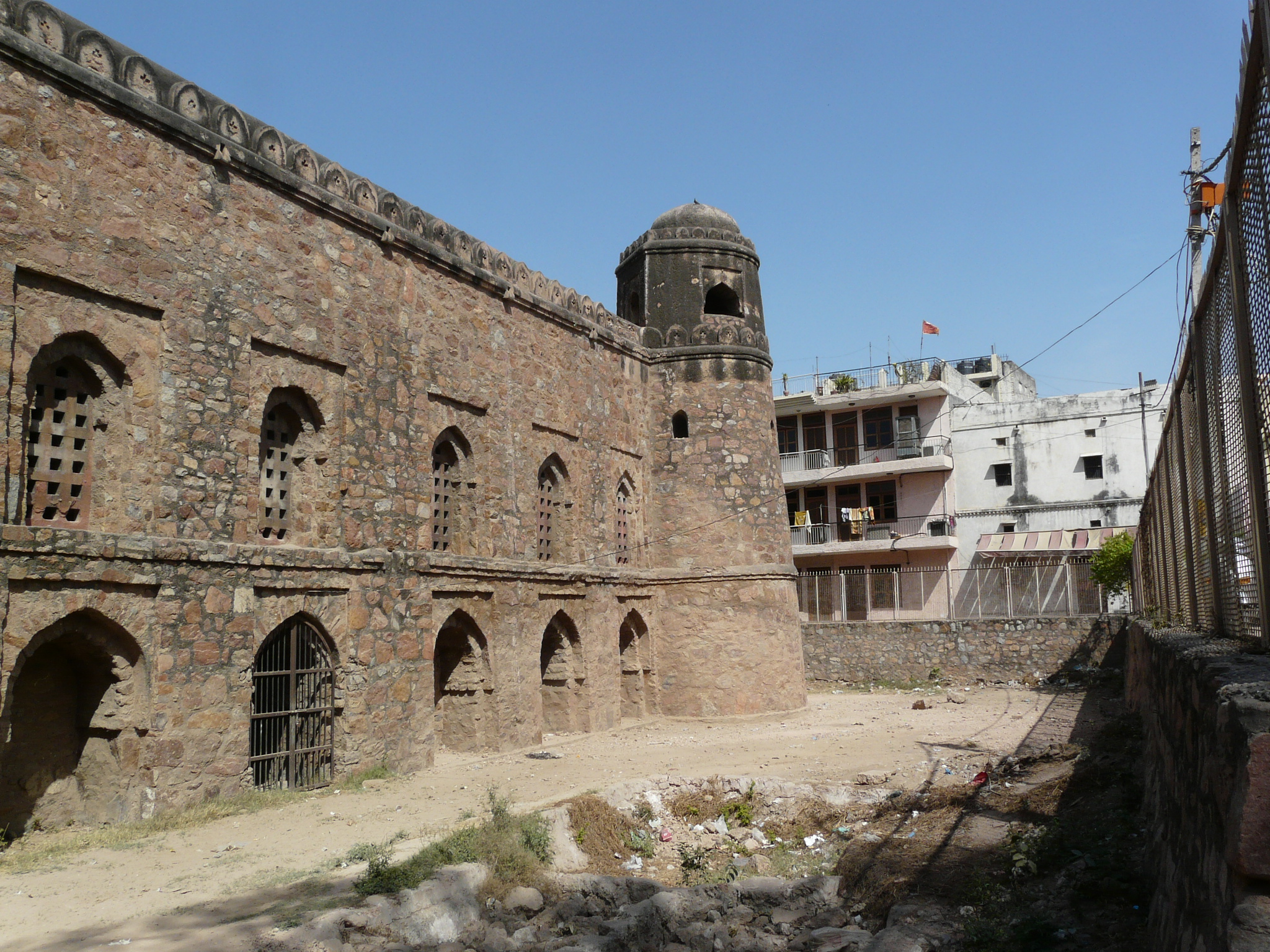
South east corner with Khirki village in the background

== See also ==
- Islam in India
- List of mosques in India
- List of Monuments of National Importance in Delhi
