= Satpula =

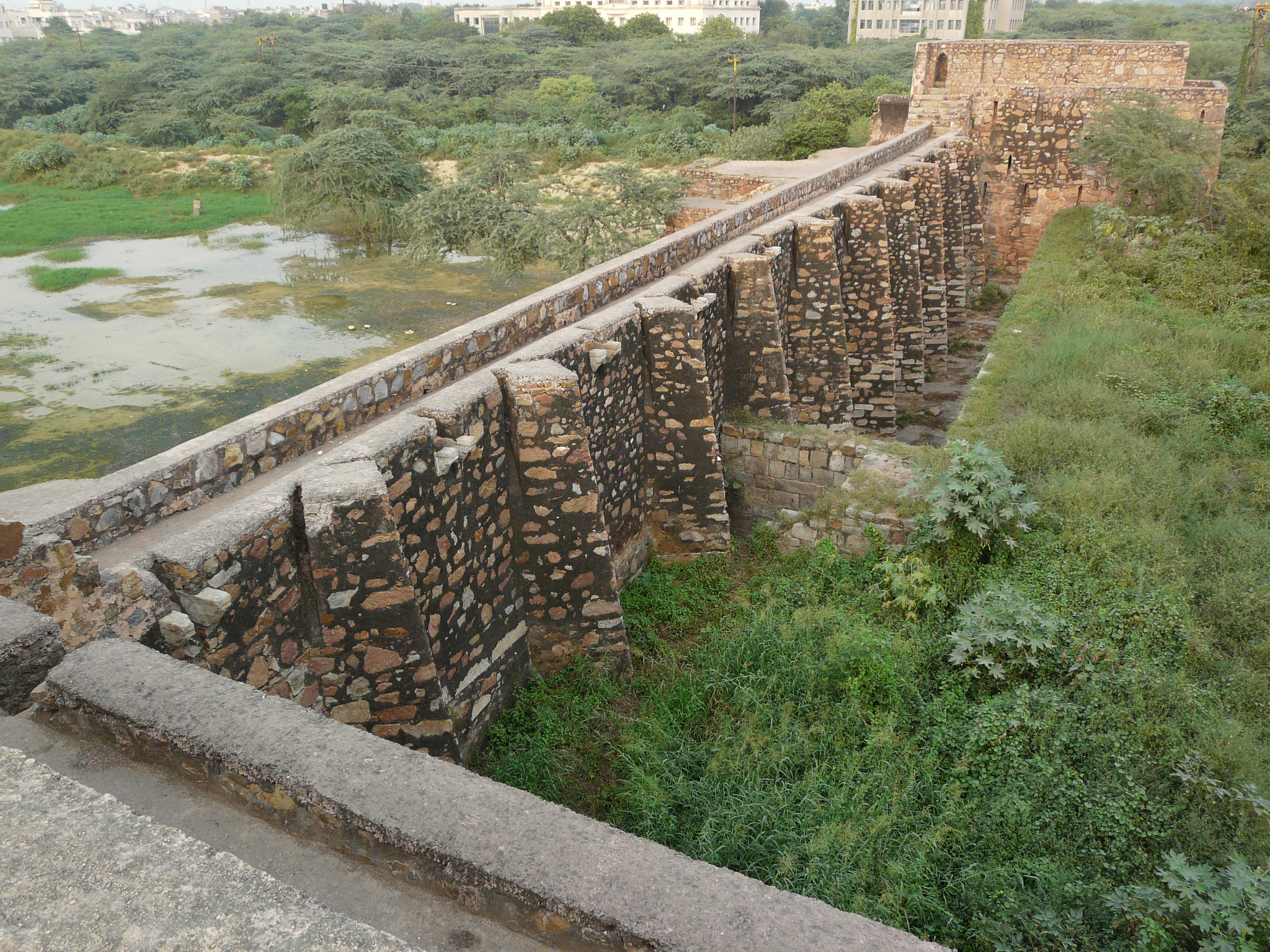
- Satpula (Seven arched bridge)
- Location: Delhi
- Coordinates: 28°31′54.23″N 77°13′24.61″E
- Construction began: 1343; 682 years ago

Dam and spillways
- Impounds: Barapulla Nallah
- Length: 79.5 m (261 ft)

Reservoir
- Creates: Irrigation

Satpula is a remarkable ancient water harvesting dam or weir located about 800 m (2,625 ft) east of the Khirki Masjid that is integral to the compound wall of the medieval fourth city of the Jahanpanah in Delhi, with its construction credited to the reign of Sultan Muhammad Shah Tughlaq (Muhammad bin Tughluq) (1325–1351) of the Tughlaq Dynasty.

The objective of building the weir was for providing water for irrigation and also, as a part of the city wall, to provide defense security to the city against attacking armies.

Satpula is a usage in Hindi languages, which literally means "seven bridges".

== History ==
During the second decade of the rule of Sultan Muhammad Shah Tughlaq, the economic conditions of the Delhi Sultanate were in distress due to very high expenses incurred on the war campaign in South India (Deccan) and also due to the Sultan establishing his southern capital at Daulatabad. Both these acts necessitated increasing taxes to enhance the treasury coffers to meet the large expenses. But people were dissatisfied and distressed with these developments. Some tribal groups, such as the Chaghatai tribes, had launched raids on many places in North India and even posed serious threats to Delhi, when the Sultan was on his south Indian campaign. In the period between 1334 and 1344, repeated droughts had caused famines that were further compounded by the Black Plague. These two natural calamities had added to the suffering of the people in the country. Urgent solutions had to be found to remedy the distress conditions. One of the viable options planned was building the Satpula, the seven arches bridge or gate controlled weir or dam, to tap the water resources of the local nullah (stream) on Southern Delhi Ridge feeding the Yamuna river, which could be used to bring large areas of flat land in the vicinity under controlled irrigated agriculture to grow food crops to stem the famine conditions. This solution was also thought to provide the much needed defense to the walls of the newly built city of Jahanpanah.

== Topography ==
The location of the Satpula, which is a part of the east–west wall protecting the southern part of Jahanpanah, drains a catchment comprising a series of low hills on the south, east, and west. The stream draining the catchment area, known as Barapulla Nallah was planned to be tapped to store the run–off water of the catchment. Command area for irrigation was identified in a large open plain on the northern side for providing water supplies from the proposed storage behind the Satpula, to grow irrigated crops to sustain a large population.

Thus, a reliable water storage reservoir in the arid region of Delhi, which has the Thar Desert on its west, was built as the headworks or weir across the Barapulla Nallah. Even though no epigraphic evidence is available to date the Satpula, a reasseacrh study report has conjectured that it could be dated to the same time as the four–eyyan Mosque (first of its kind in India) called Jami built by Muhammad bin Tughluq in 1343.

== Structure ==
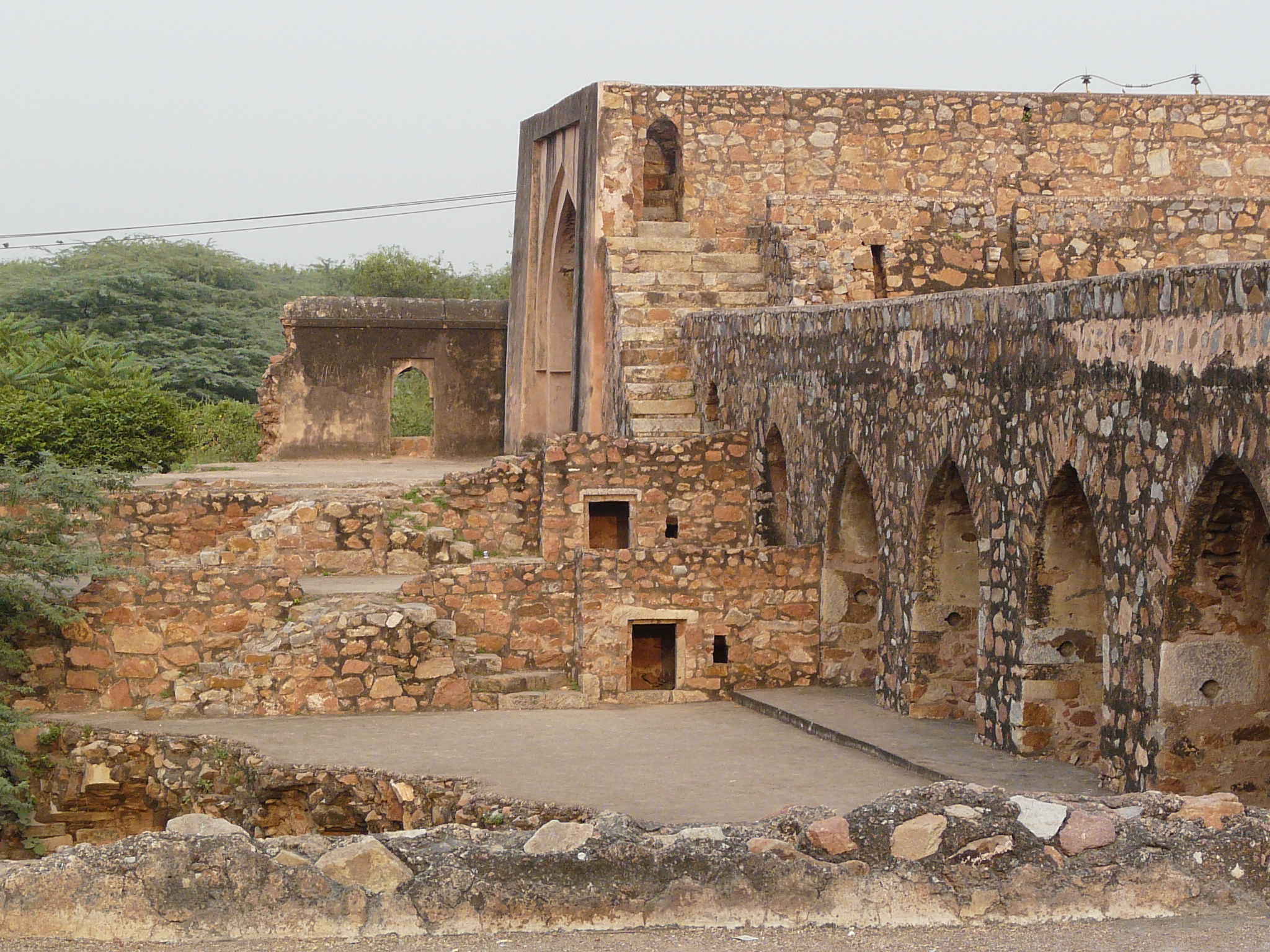
Gate Platforms and sluice arches

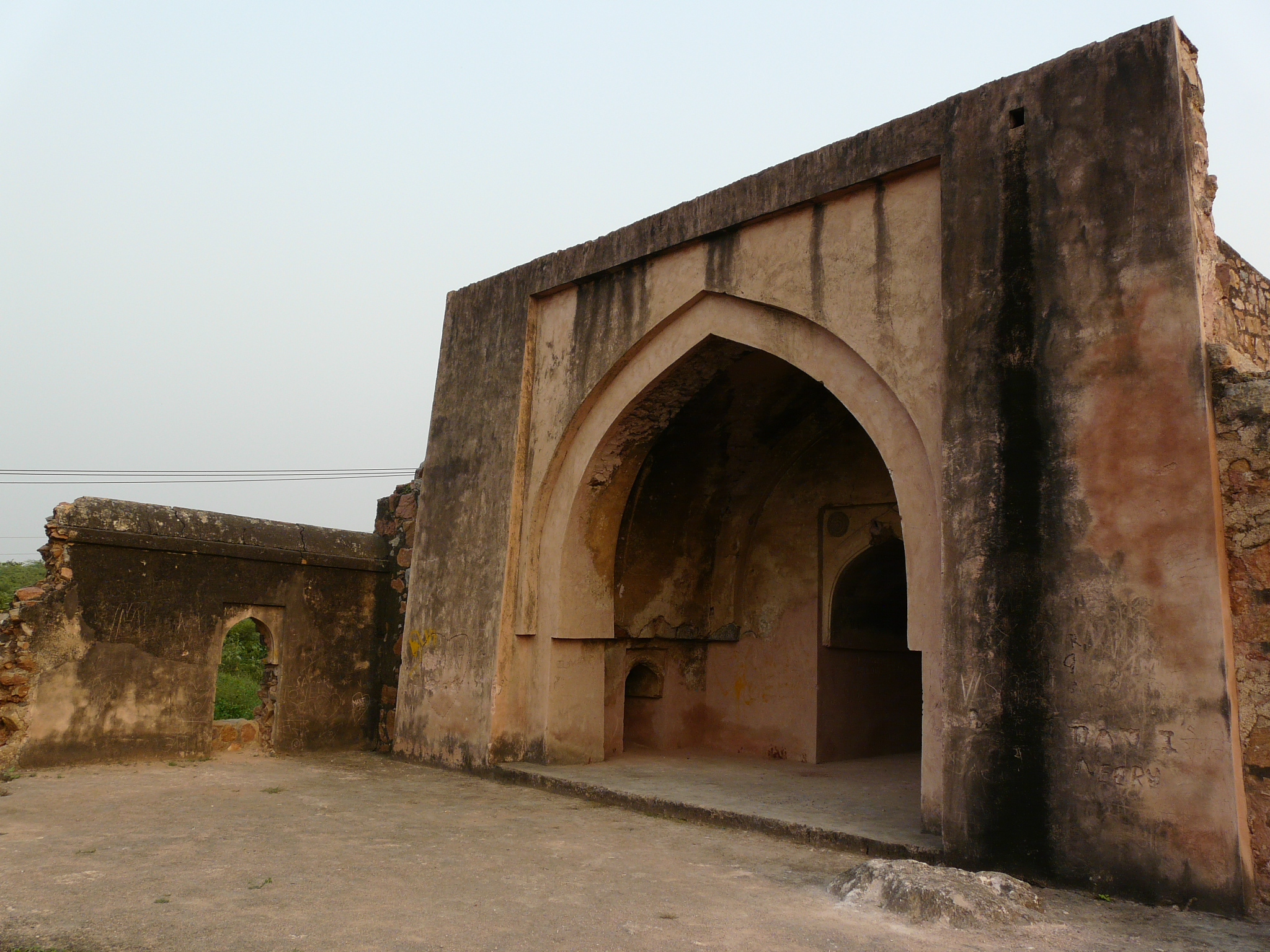
End pavilion

The Satpula across the stream was built as a gate controlled weir. The total length of the structure is 79.5 m (261 ft). It has been constructed in stone masonry. The eleven bays of the weir controlled by sluice gates cover a total length of 54.5 m (179 ft). These eleven bays consist of eleven water tunnels (sluices), each 14.6 m (48 ft) in length, 3.2 m (10 ft) in height, and 2.2–2.9 m (7–10 ft) in width. These are located at different levels, with seven main bays at the lowest level. The balance two additional bays on each bank, on the far east and west sides, are at a higher level. The control arrangements seen now are in the form of gate grooves to operate vertical slide gates. When built, wooden vertical sluice gates made of heavy boards of size 16 cm (1 ft) in thickness, 3 m (10 ft) width, and more than 3 m (10 ft) in height, were operated by a rope and pulley arrangement to control flow of water; the wooden gates have since disintegrated but the gate groves are visible in each bay. The gates of the sluices were closed as a defensive measure against possible attack in the dry season when no storage remained in the dam. Each bay of the weir has an arched opening. On both banks of the weir identical towers (defensive bastions, projecting on the south and north sides) of 5.97 m (20 ft) diameter, but with octagonal shape chambers, are built, which once functioned as madrasa (Islamic school of learning). Hence, the Satpula is also known as "Madarsa". The second level sluice bays on both banks lead to arched corridors. The walls of the octagonal chambers have graceful decorations. The stream tapped by this weir, has been diverted now further east. The indication of the use of the sluices of the structure, either as a dam or for defense purposes, could be gauged from the platforms provided at the appropriate levels. Silt deposition in the storage area of the reservoir side at the southern end is also seen now.

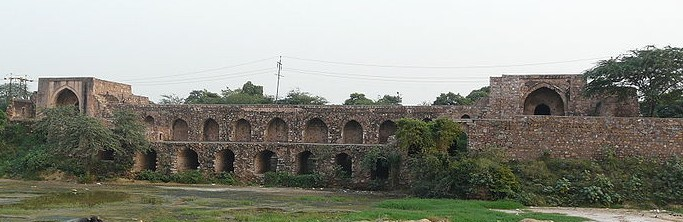
View of Satpula structure from the reservoir end showing the three tier setting of the sluices and the towers on both banks

== Restoration ==
The Archaeological Survey of India (ASI) has recently carried out restoration works of the Satpula. This restoration now permits access to the wide parapet of the bridge to fully view the impressive engineering structure. The restoration works carried out by ASI, for specially identified monuments, is in sync with the slogan ‘Welcome to Historical City of Delhi’ adopted by the Commonwealth Secretariat for the 2010 Common Wealth Games to be held in Delhi. The restoration works of the Satpula is at an estimated cost of Rs 20 lakhs (US$40,000) for conservation of the monument to highlight its structural elegance by improving its overall view, enhancing environmental aesthetics and its illumination. The Delhi Development Authority has also invited reputed NGOs for the restoration of the water body at this site. The ASI owns the monument, whereas the water body is under the control of DDA.

== Visitor information ==
Satpula is located about 800 m (2,625 ft) east of Khirki Masjid. It is close to the present city suburb of Saket on the Press Enclave Road. In the medieval period, it connected four principal cities namely, the Qila Rai Pithora (the first city of Delhi – Lal Kot or Qutub complex), Siri (with the Siri Fort forming the second city of Delhi), Tughlaqabad (the third city of Delhi) and Jahanpanah (the fourth city of Delhi, the boundary limits of which encompassed the other earlier built three cities). It is locally believed that the waters stored by the weir had healing powers because the sufi saint Nasiru'd-Din Mahmud is reported to have used the waters of this reservoir for daily oblations before offering prayers at the Mosque.

== Gallery ==
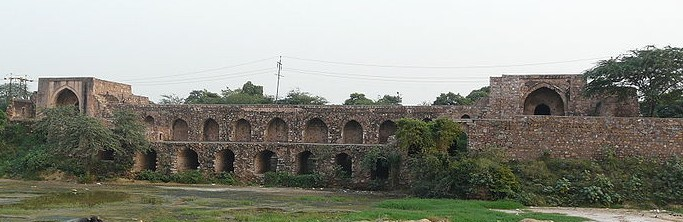

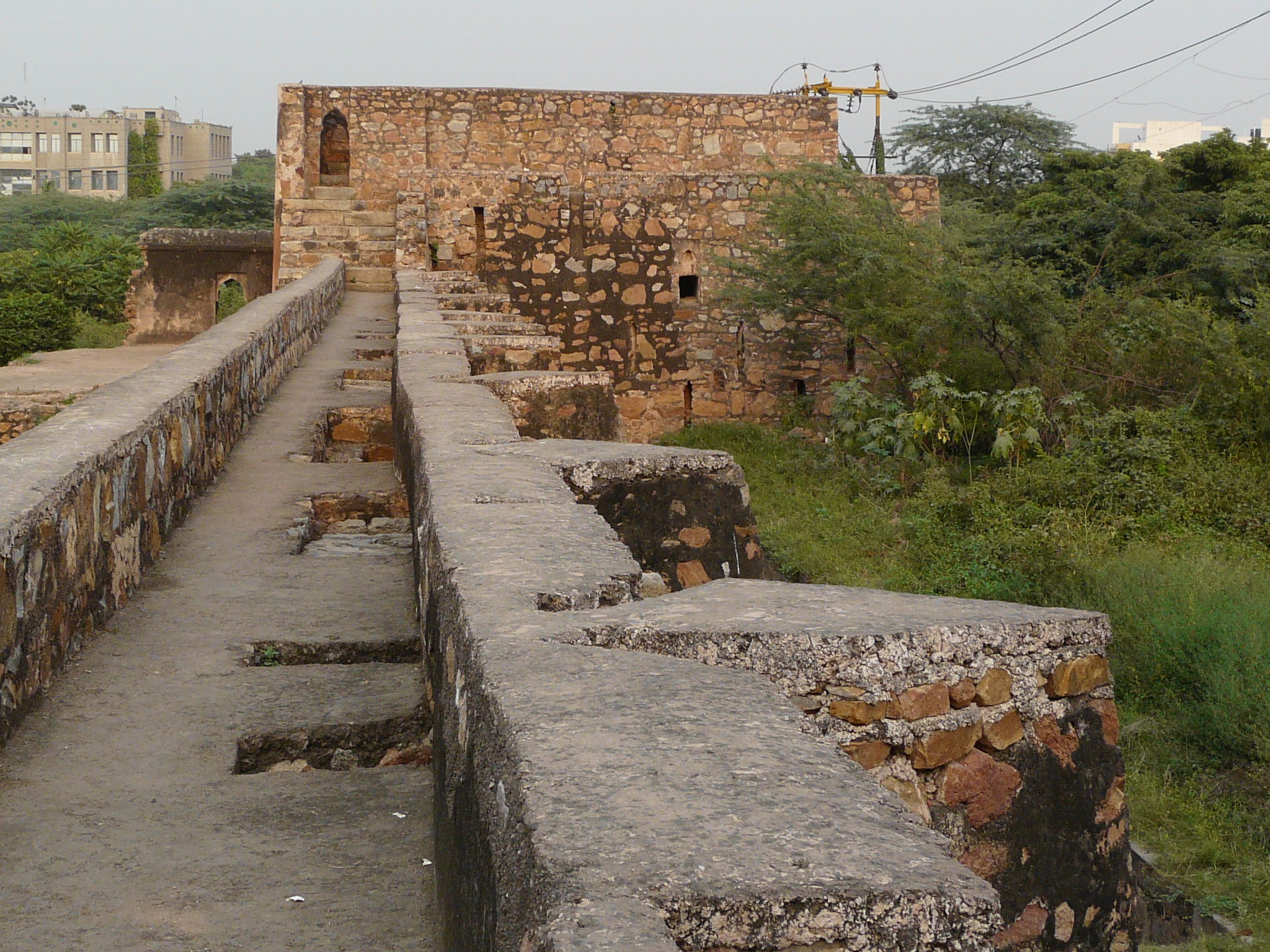

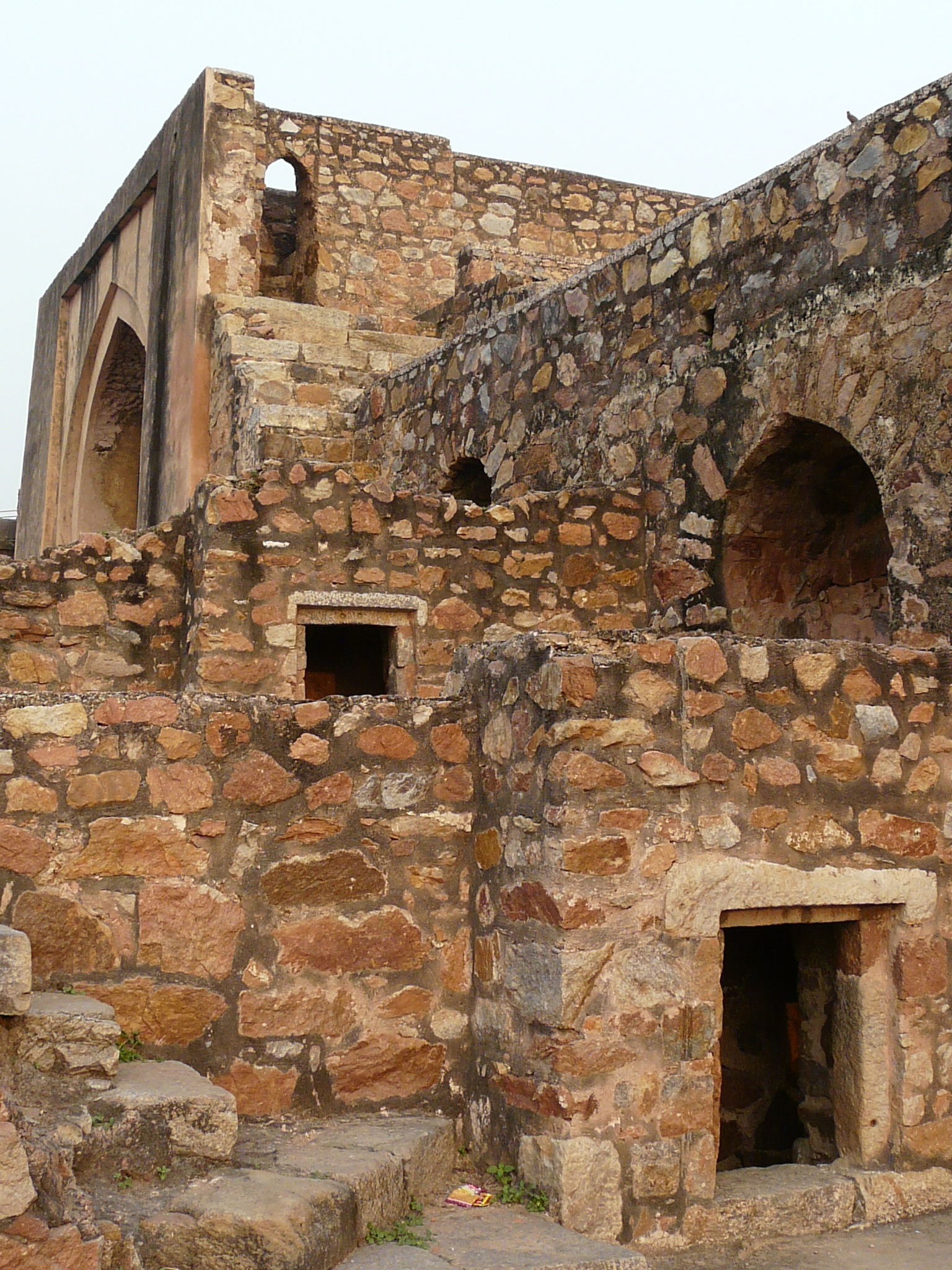
