= Mehrauli =

- District Subdivision
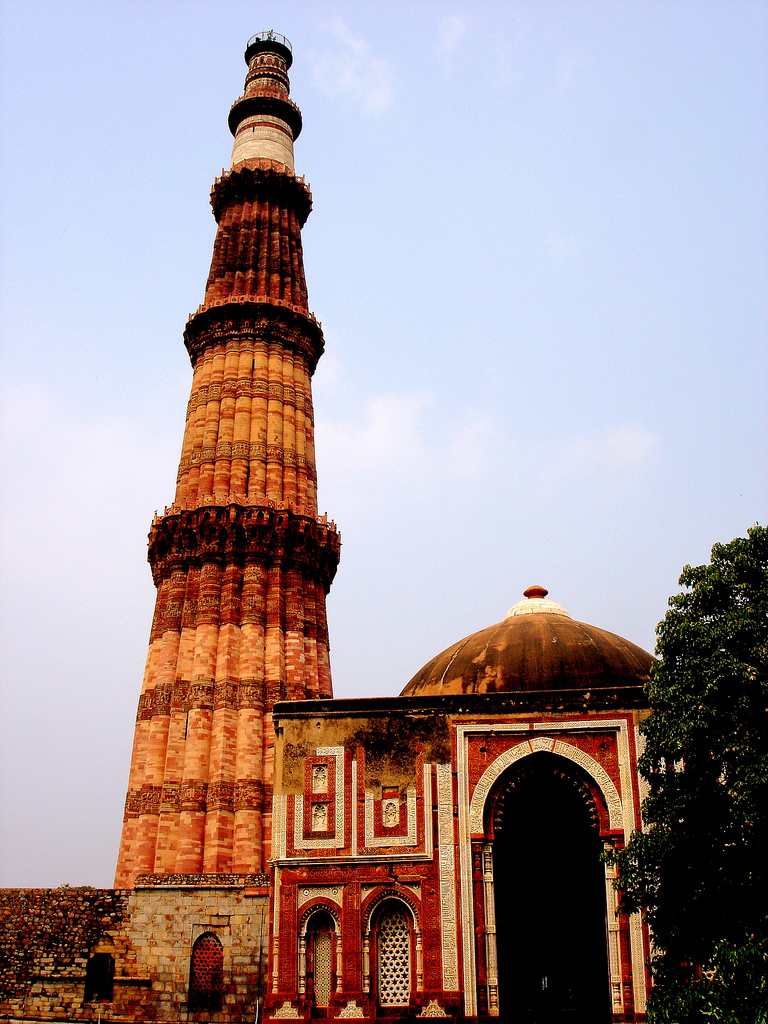
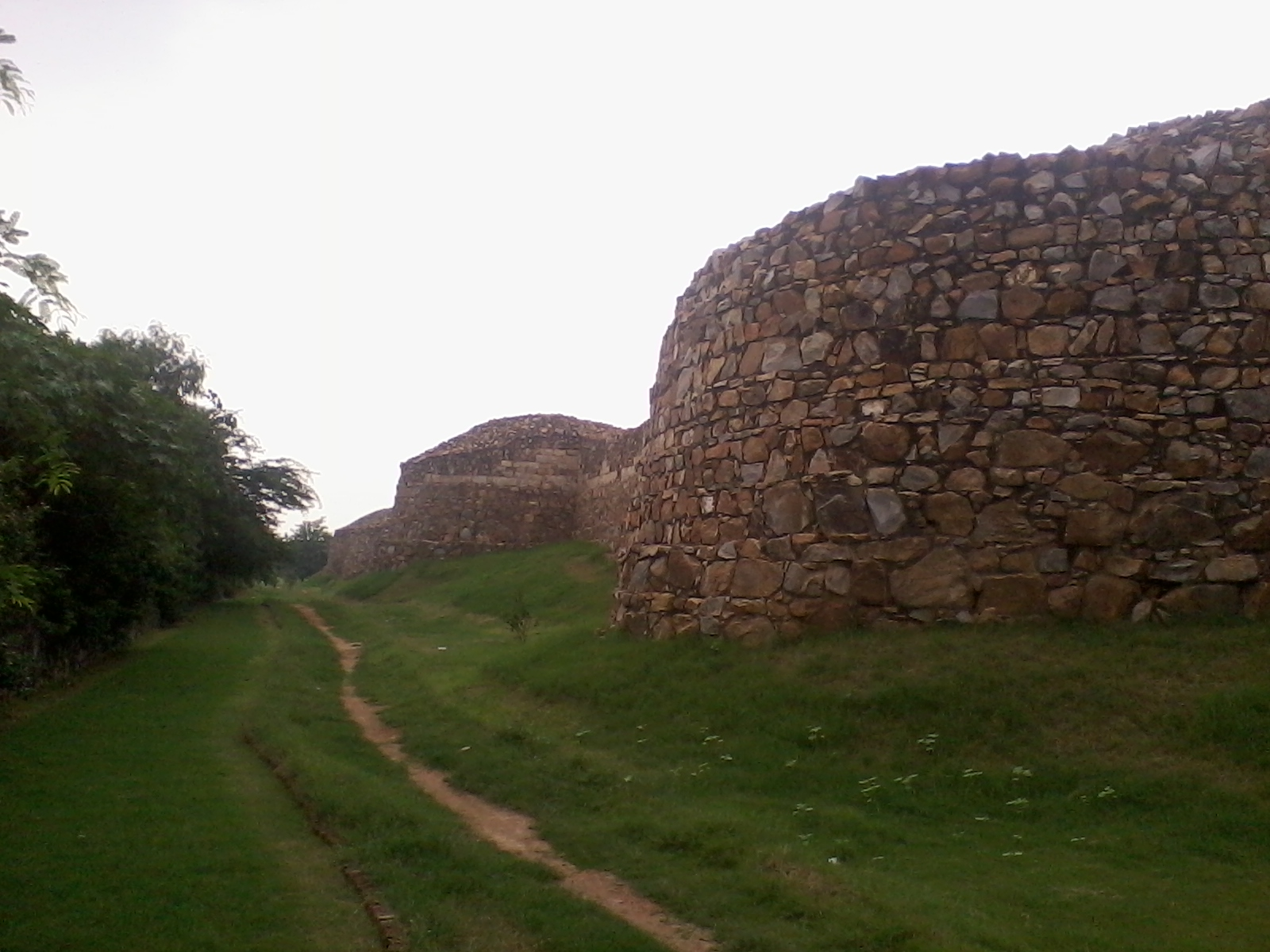
- Qutub Minar in Mehrauli and Lal kot or Qila Rai Pithora

- Location within Delhi
- Coordinates: 28°30′57″N 77°10′39″E
- Country: India
- Union territory: Delhi
- District: South Delhi
- Established: 1060 A D
- Founder: Anangpal Tomar

Government
  - MLA: Gajender Yadav

Languages
  - Official: Hindi, English
- Time zone: UTC+5:30 (IST)
- PIN: 110 030
- Telephone code: 011
- Vehicle registration: DL-xx

Mehrauli is a neighbourhood in South Delhi, Delhi, India. It represents a constituency in the Delhi Legislative Assembly. The area is close to Gurugram and next to Vasant Kunj.

== History ==
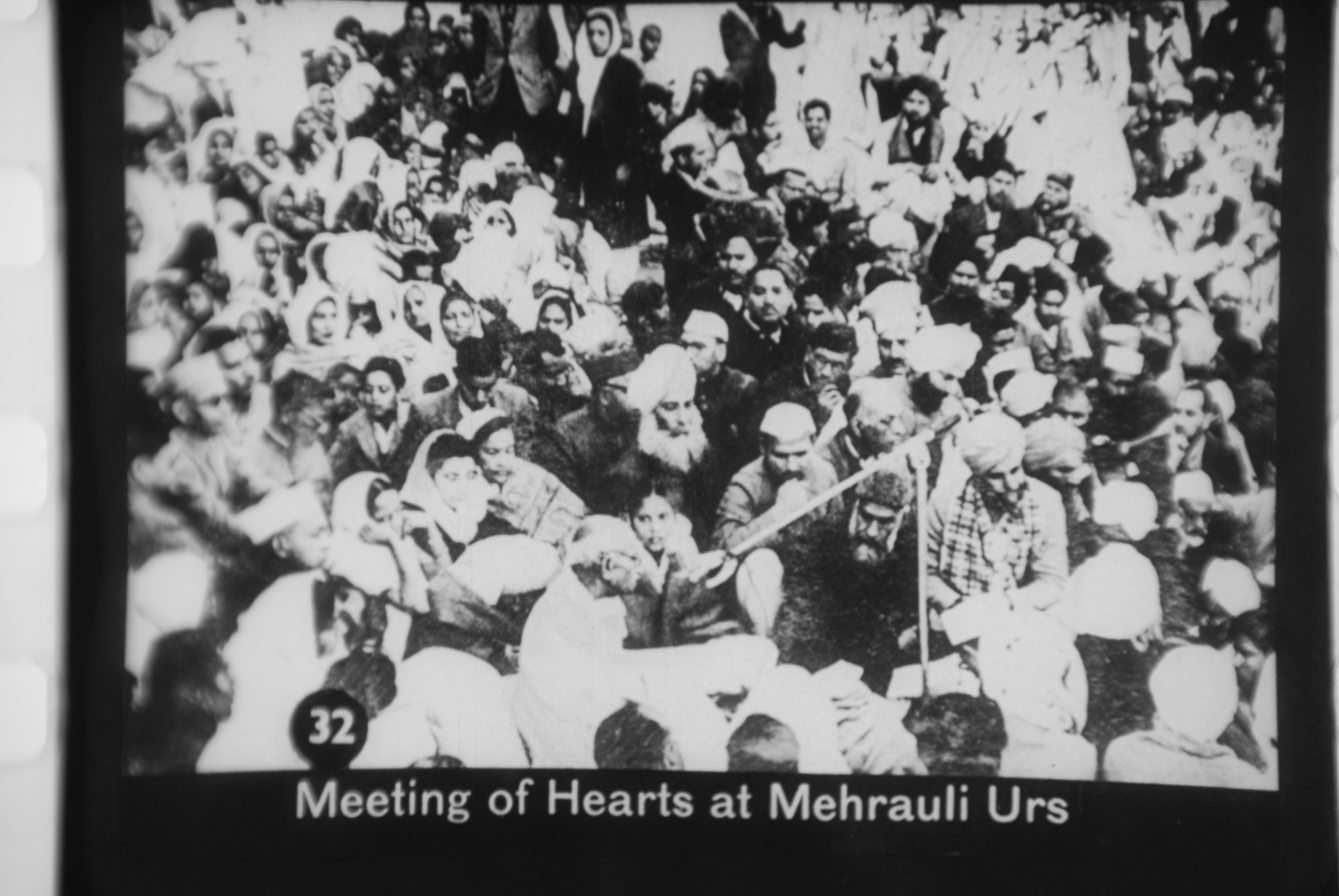
Mahatma Gandhi visiting the dargah of Qutbuddin Bakhtiar Kaki, on his Urs, 27 January 1948.

Mehrauli village is considered the oldest continuously inhabited village in Delhi and is founded by the Tomar Rajputs in 1060 A.D, who founded early Delhi. It was established during the reign of Anangpal Tanwar II, the ruler credited with founding Delhi and building Lal Kot, the city’s first fort. Over time, descendants of the Tomar Rajputs have founded other old villages around Delhi as well. Mahipalpur is associated with the descendants of the Tomar lineage Mahipal Singh Tomar he was the 19th descendant and 18th ruler of Delhi under Tomar dynasty, while Naraina village is said to have been founded by Naina Pal Singh Tanwar who was also the 24th descendant of Maharaja Anagpal Singh Tomar. These villages reflect the long-standing presence of the Rajput community who once ruled and helped shape the early history of Delhi.

The Lal Kot fort was constructed by the Tomar chief Anangpal I around 731 AD and expanded by Anangpal II in the 11th century,who shifted his capital to Lal Kot from Kannauj. The Tomars were defeated by the Chauhans in the 12th century. Prithviraj Chauhan further expanded the fort, which is now Qila Rai Pithora. He was defeated and killed in 1192 by Mohammed Ghori, who put his general Qutb-ud-din Aybak in charge and returned to Afghanistan.

Subsequently in 1206, after the death of Mohammed Ghori, Qutubuddin enthroned himself as the first Sultan of Delhi. Thus Delhi became the capital of the Mamluk dynasty of Delhi (Slave dynasty), the first dynasty of Muslim sultans to rule over northern India. Mehrauli remained the capital of the Mamluk dynasty which ruled until 1290. During the Khilji dynasty, the capital shifted to Siri.

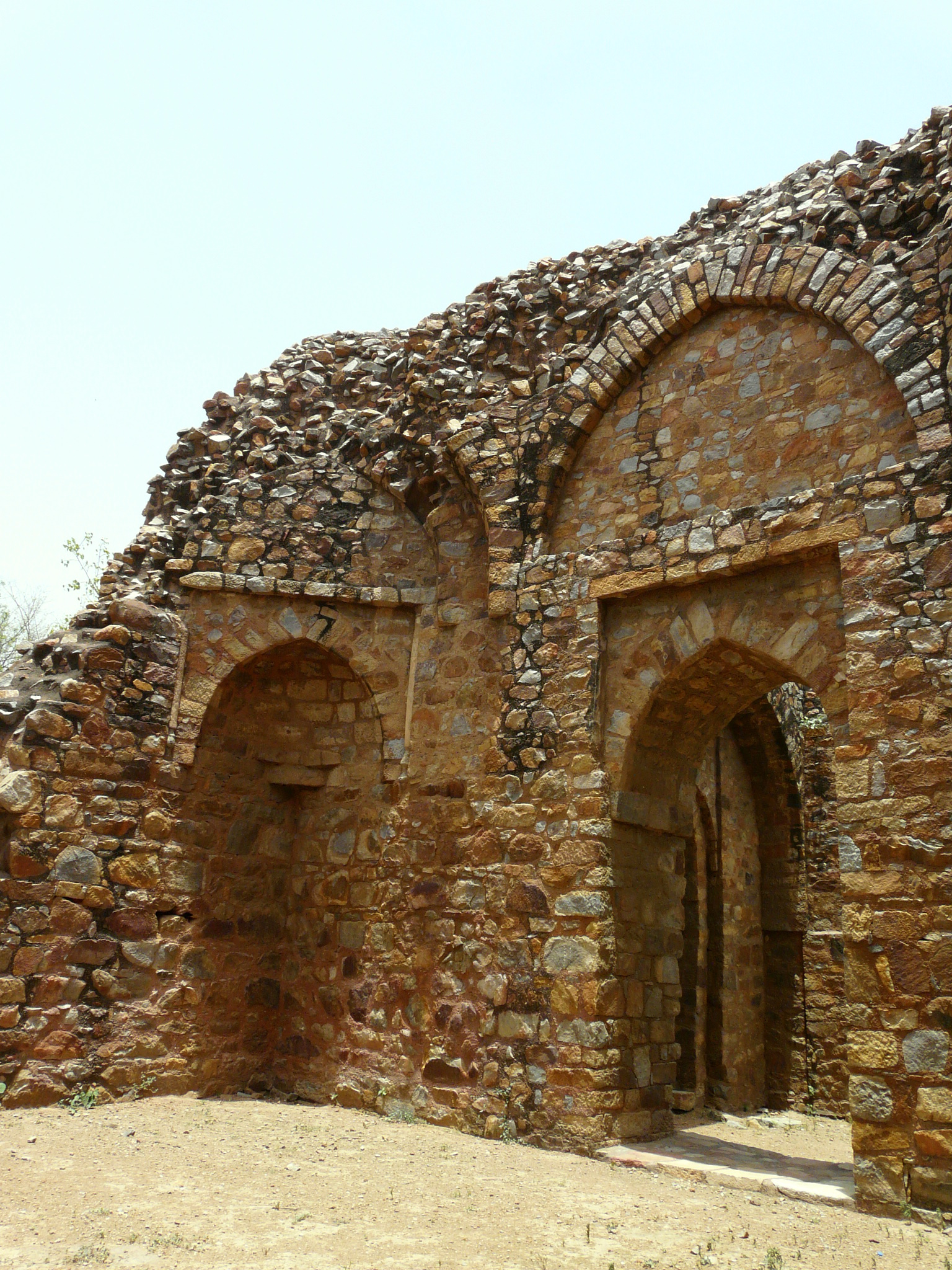
Balban's tomb, Mehrauli

In 12th-century Jain scriptures, the location is also mentioned as Yogninipura, now noticeable by the presence of the "Yogmaya Temple", near the Qutub Minar complex, believed to have been built by the Pandavas.

It was also the execution place of Banda Singh Bahadur after he sacked the regional Mughal capital of Samana.

== Geography and climate ==
Mehrauli lies in the South district of Delhi at 28°30′57″N 77°10′39″E. To its north lies Malviya Nagar. Vasant Kunj lies to its West and Tughlakabad to its south.

Like the rest of Delhi, Mehrauli has a semi-arid climate with high variation between summer and winter temperatures. While the summer temperatures may go up to 46 °C, the winters can seem freezing to people used to a warm climate with near 0 °C.

The soil of Mehrauli consists of sandy loam to loam texture. The water level has gone down in the recent past hovering between 45 m to 50 m due to rise in population.

== Architecture ==
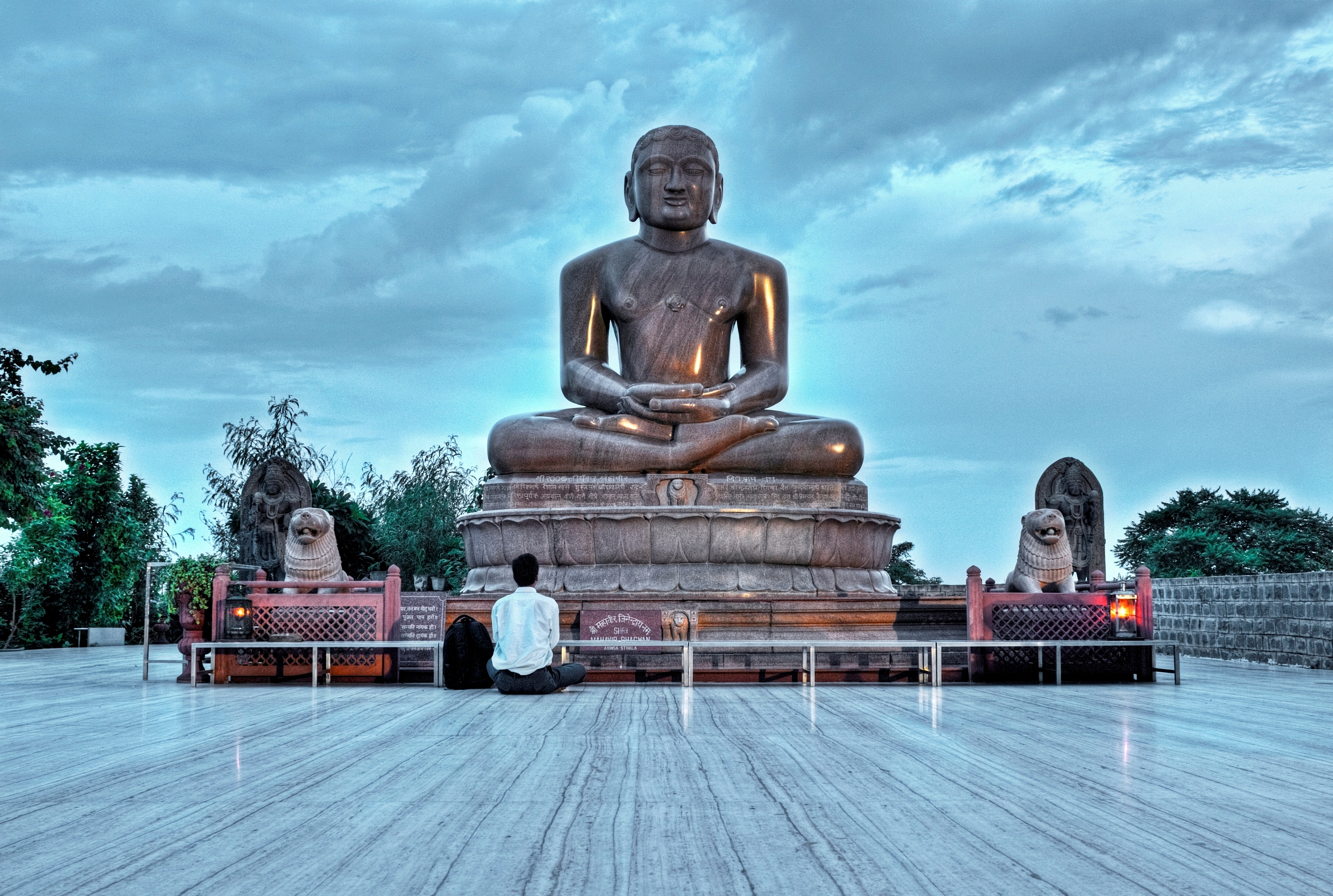
Ahinsa Sthal is a 13 feet 6 inches Mahaveer single rock idol.

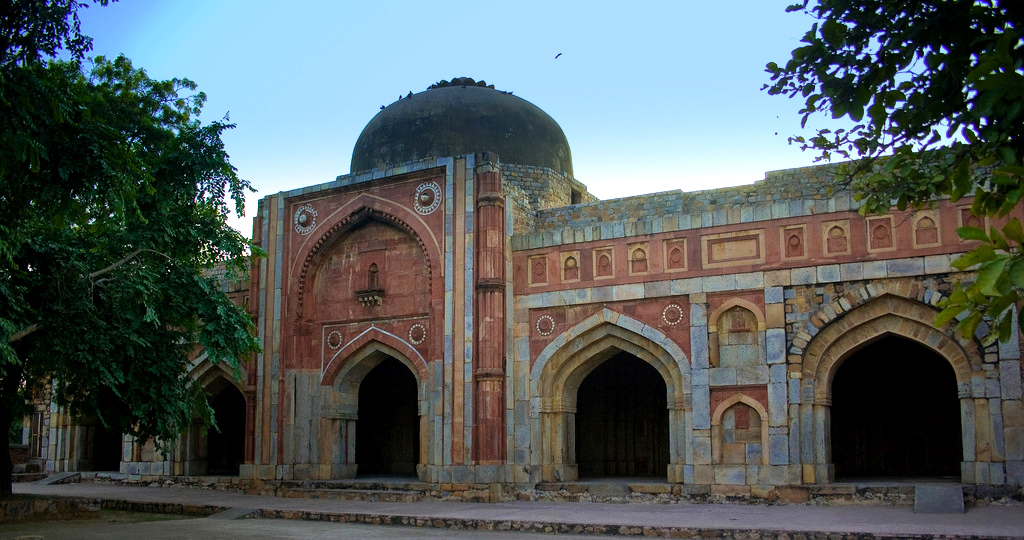
Jamali Kamali Mosque and Tomb complex, Mehrauli Archaeological Park

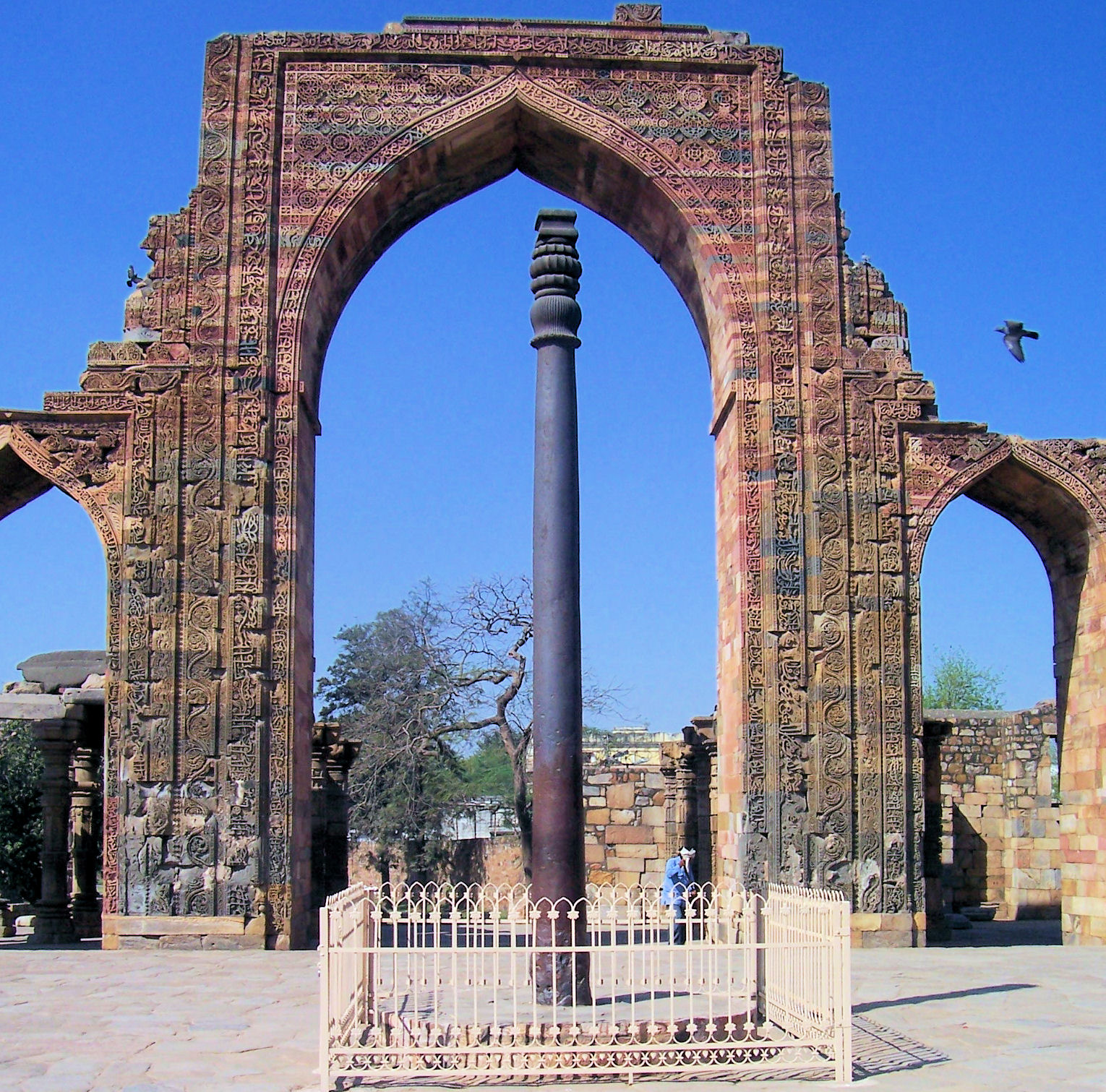
Mehrauli's Iron Pillar in the Qutb complex

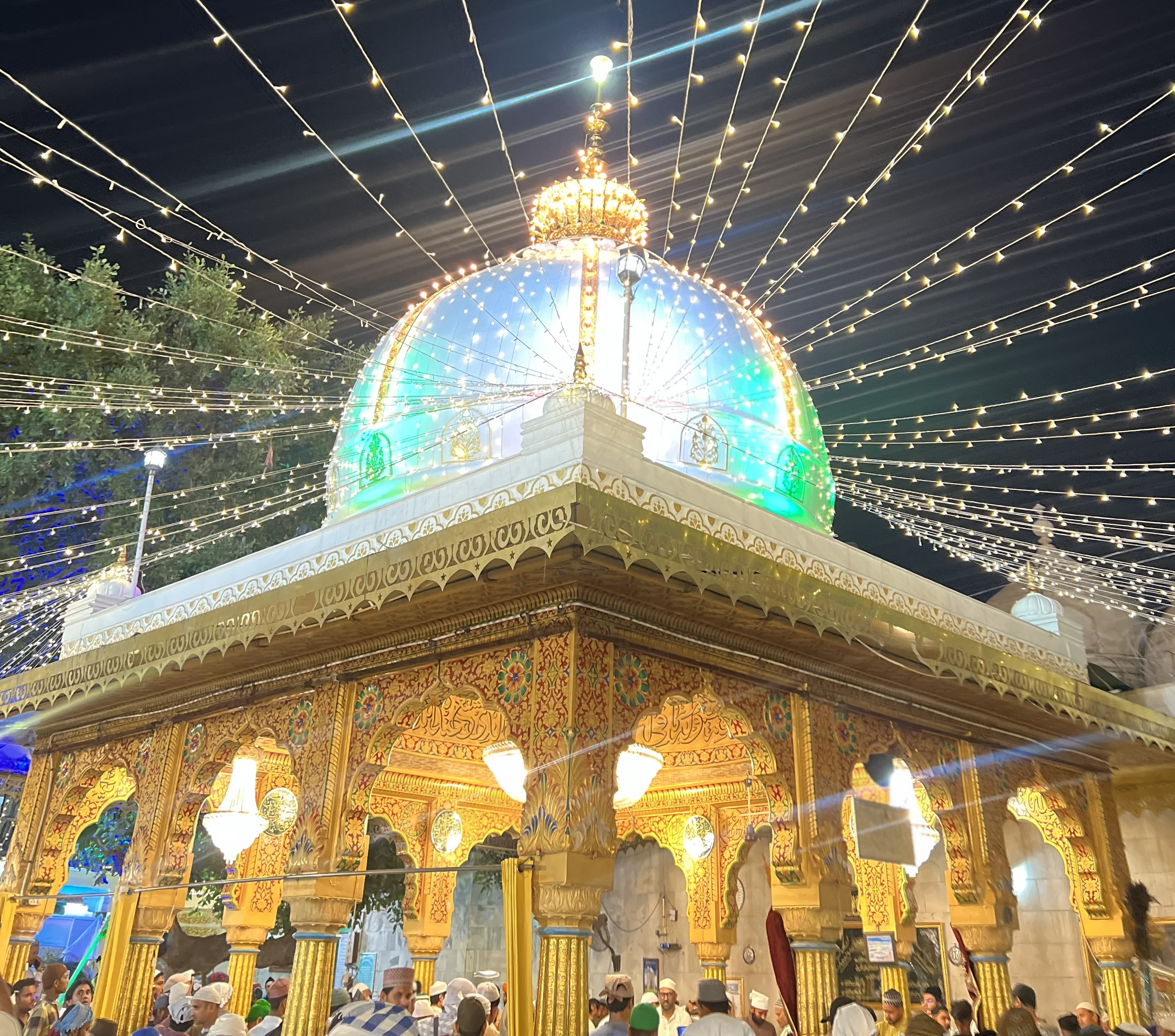
Urs celebration of Khwaja Qutbuddin Bakhtiar Kaki at Mehrauli

Ahinsa Sthal is a Jain temple in Mehrauli. The main deity of the temple is Mahavira, the 24th and last Tirthankara (human spiritual guide) of a present half cycle of time. A magnificent statue of Tirthankara Mahavira is installed here.

Even though the capital shifted from Mehrauli after the Mamluk dynasty rule came to an end, many other dynasties contributed significantly to Mehrauli's architecture.

The most visible piece of architecture remains the Qutub Minar which was built by Qutb ud-Din Aibak with subsequent additions by Iltutmish and Alauddin Khalji. The Qutb Minar complex is a UNESCO World Heritage Site, and also the venue for the annual Qutub Festival.Mausoleum of a 13th-century Sufi saint, Khwaja Qutbuddin Bakhtiar Kaki, is also situated near the Qutub Minar Complex and the venue for the annual Phoolwalon-ki-sair Festival. The dargah complex also houses graves of later Mughal emperors, Bahadur Shah I, Shah Alam II, and Akbar II, in an adjacent marble enclosure. To the left of the dargah, lies Zafar Mahal, the summer palace of the last Mughal Emperor Bahadur Shah Zafar along with Moti Masjid, a small mosque, built for private prayer by the son of Aurangzeb, Bahadur Shah I.

Balban's tomb belonging to Balban, Mamluk dynasty ruler of Delhi Sultanate was constructed here in the 13th century can still be seen through in a dilapidated condition. The architecturally important structure as it is the first true arch in Indo-Islamic architecture. Another tomb, that of Balban's son, Khan Shahid, who died before he could be crowned, is also located nearby in Mehrauli Archeological Park.

A baoli or stepwell known as Rajon Ki Baoli was constructed in 1506 during Sikandar Lodhi's reign. It was used to store water though it is now completely dried and is now known as Sukhi Baoli (dry well).

The Jamali Kamali Mosque was built in 1528, in honour of the Sufi saint Shaikh Hamid bin Fazlullah, also known as Dervish Shaikh tahaJamali Kamboh Dihlawi or Jalal Khan. The saint's tomb built-in 1536 upon his death is adjacent to the mosque.

Near the Jamali Kamali lies the tomb of Quli Khan, which during the British period was converted into a country house by the Metcalfe family. Known as 'the retreat' or 'Dilkhusha', this was built by Sir Thomas Theophilus Metcalfe in true English style as a pleasure retreat by surrounding it with many rest houses, follies, and gardens. 'Dilkhusha' in Urdu means "Delight of the Heart".

The Adham Khan's Tomb was constructed by Mughal Emperor Akbar in memory of his foster brother and general Adham Khan in 1566. The tomb, also known as Bhulbhulaiyan, as one could get lost in the labyrinth of its passages, it was later used by the British as a residence, rest house and even as a police station. Close to Adham Khan's tomb, lies that of another Mughal General, Muhammad Quli Khan, later it served as the residence of Sir Thomas Metcalfe, governor-general's agent at the Mughal court. The Mehrauli Archaeological Park spread over 200 acres, adjacent to Qutb Minar site was redeveloped in 1997.

Most of the monuments and heritage buildings in Mehrauli today lie in a state of despair. Due to unplanned urban sprawl especially after the Partition of India, most havelis, mosques and baolis were occupied and razed to build houses. Poor restoration and conservation have led to the disappearance, encroachment and vandalization of many heritage buildings.

In February 2024, a controversy erupted after the Delhi Development Authority demolished a 600-year-old mosque, madrasa and several graves without any prior notice. The demolition was criticized by several historians and scholars.

== Politics ==
Post Delhi's 2022 municipal delimitation, the Mehrauli assembly constituency (AC-45) comprises 3 municipal wards, which are Lado Sarai (ward 154), Mehrauli (ward 155), and Vasant Kunj (ward 156). Of these, ward 155 is reserved for women, while the other two are unreserved.

As of September 2025, BJP's Gajender Yadav is the MLA of Mehrauli. The councillor for Lado Sarai is Rajeev Sansanwal (AAP), for Mehrauli is Rekha gajender yadav (AAP), and for Vasant Kunj is Jagmohan Mehlawat (BJP).

== 2008 blasts ==
Concealed in a black polythene bag, a tiffin box bomb was dropped by two unidentified persons riding a motorcycle in Mehrauli's Sarai electronic market on 27 September 2008, killing 3 people and injuring 23 others.

== Mehrauli Gallery ==
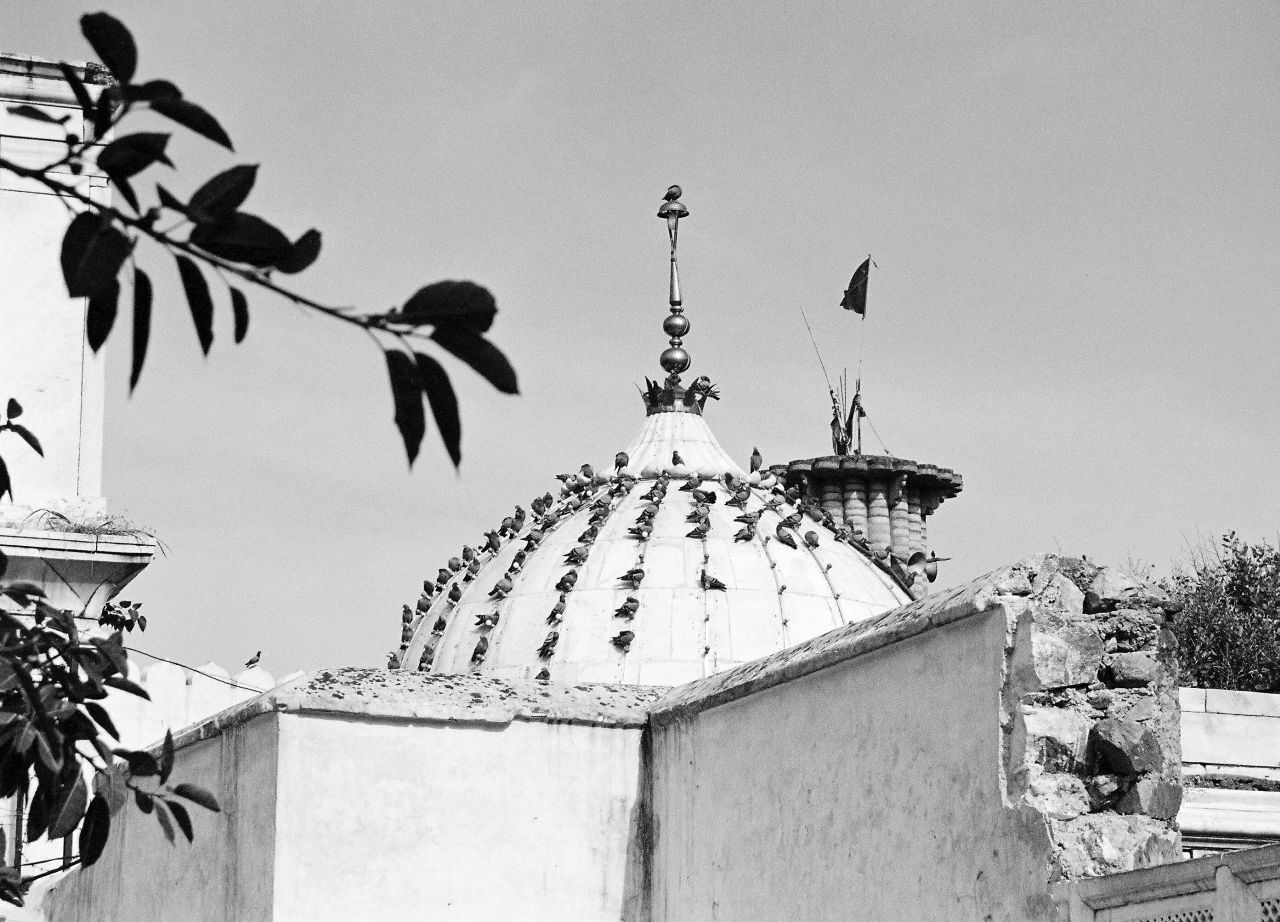
Tomb of Qutbuddin Bakhtiar Kaki, Mehrauli.

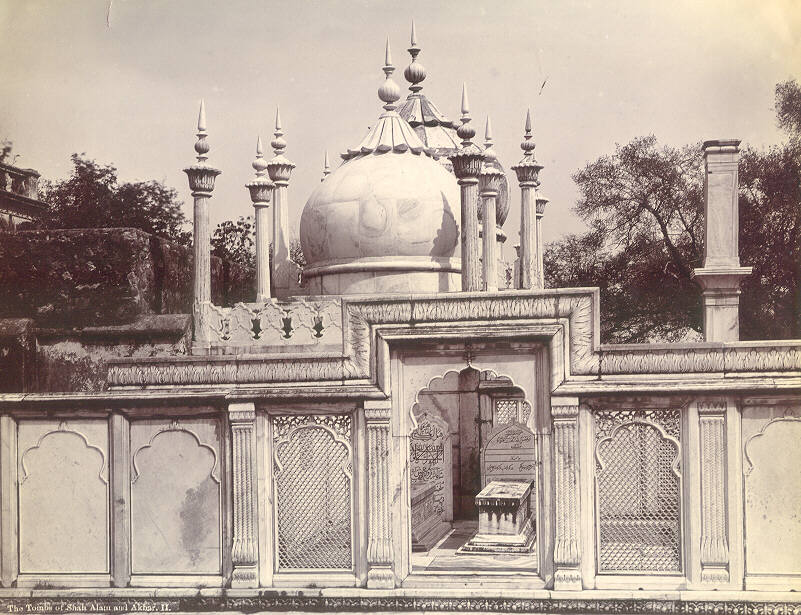
The tombs of Mughal Emperor, Shah Alam II and his son Akbar II within Kaki mausoleum complex

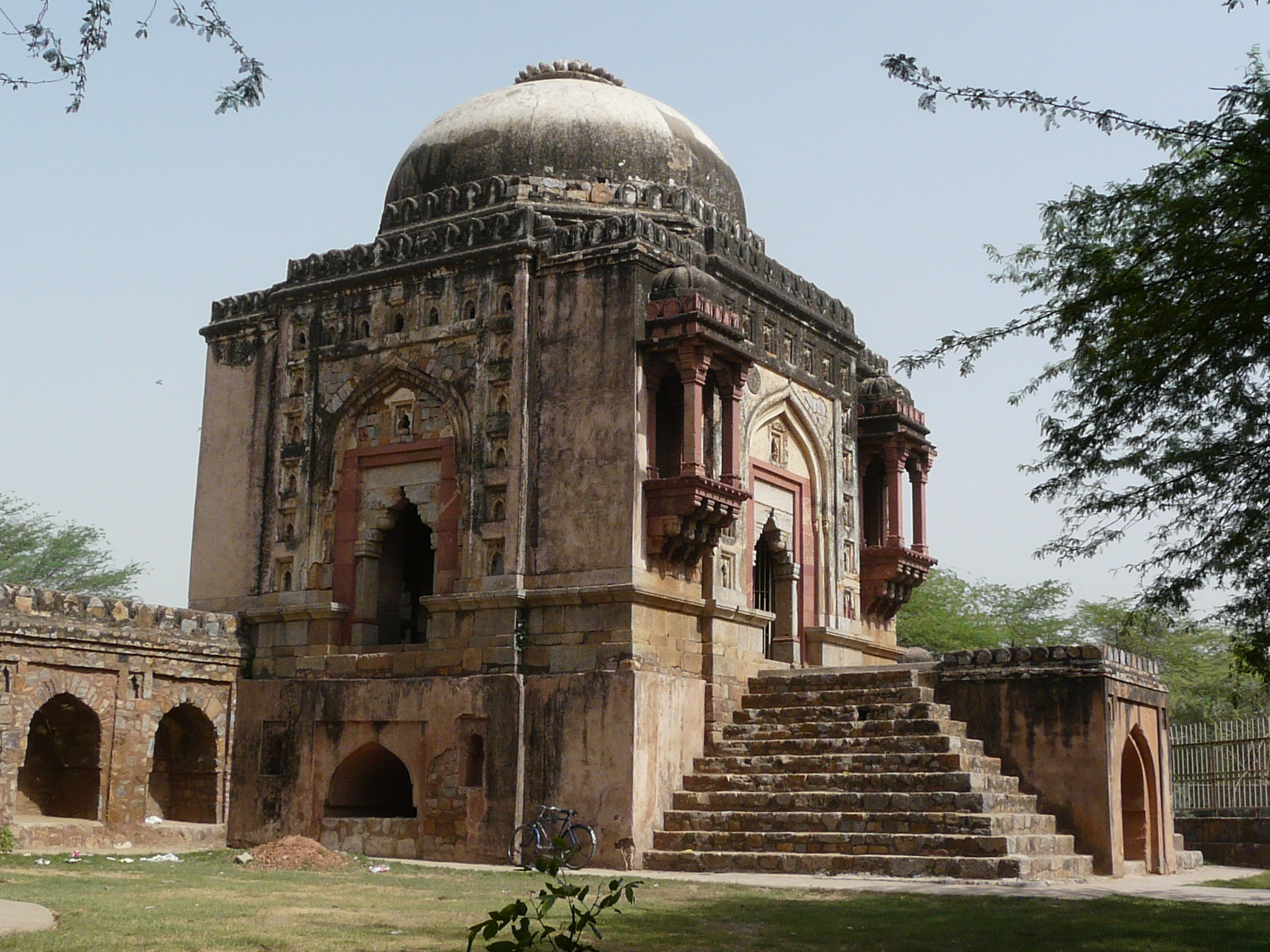
Madhi Masjid entrance gateway, Mehrauli.

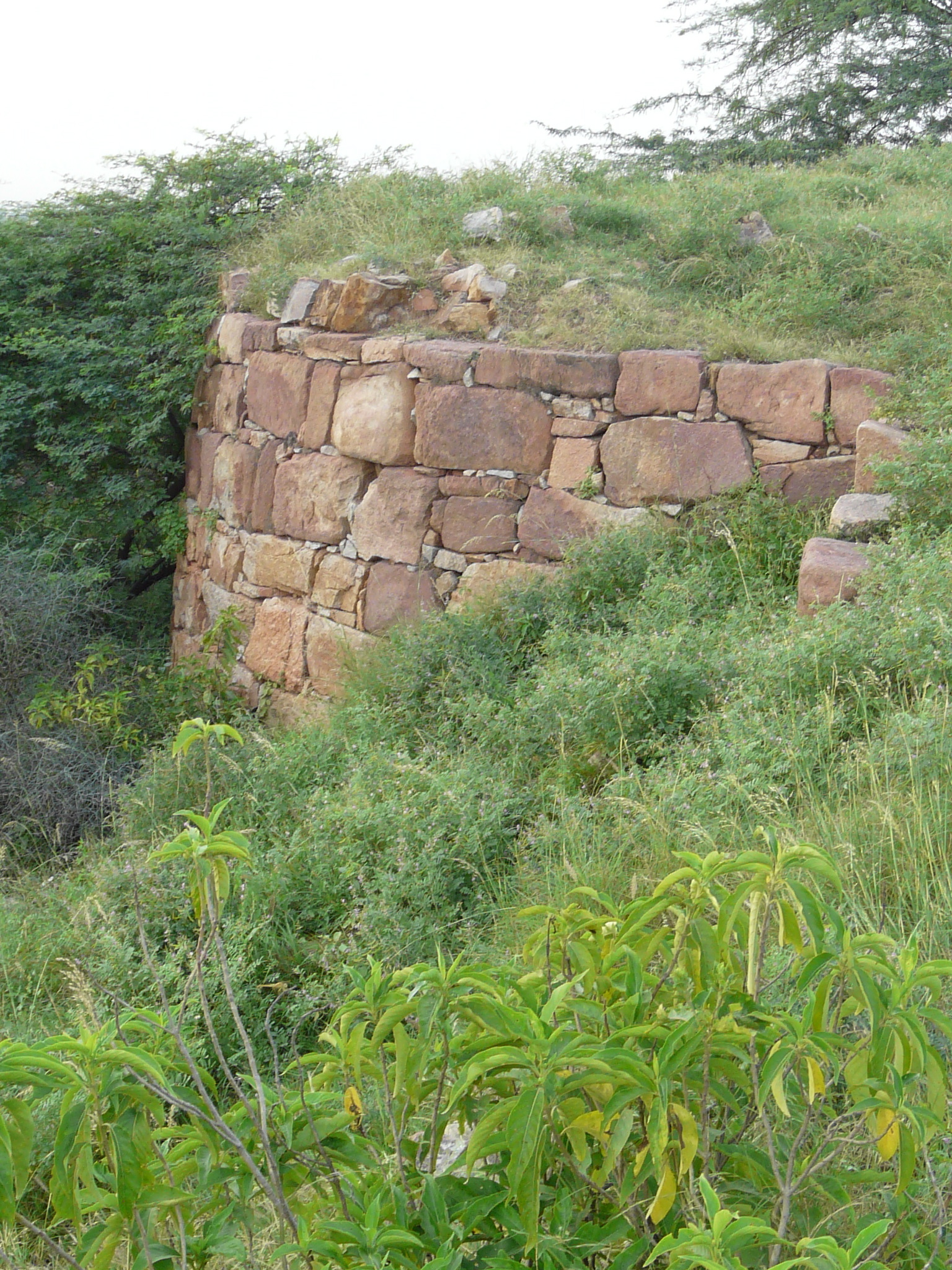
The bastion of Lal Kot fort, Mehrauli

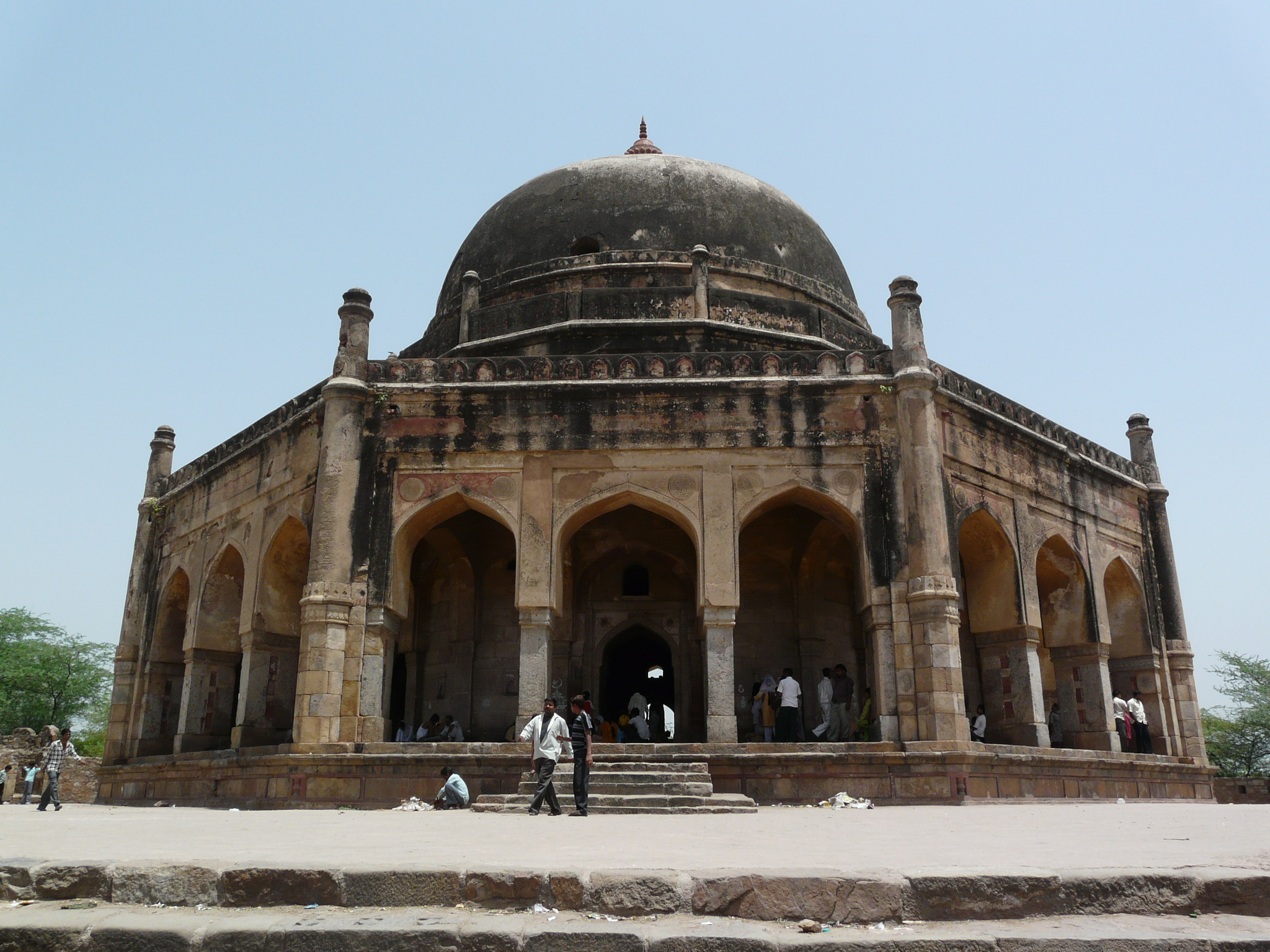
Adham Khan's Tomb, Mehrauli.

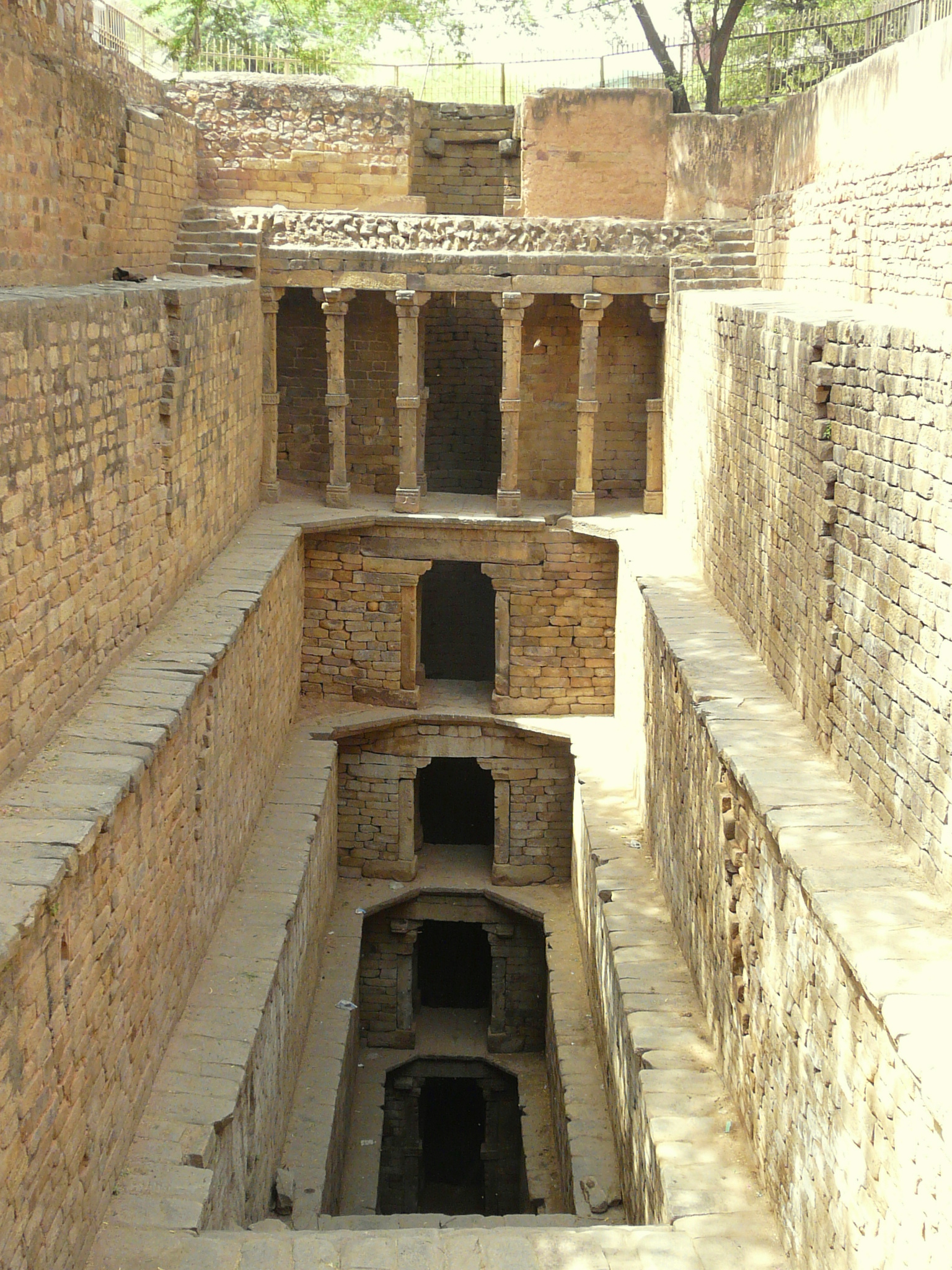
Gandhak ki Baoli, stepwell, Mehrauli.

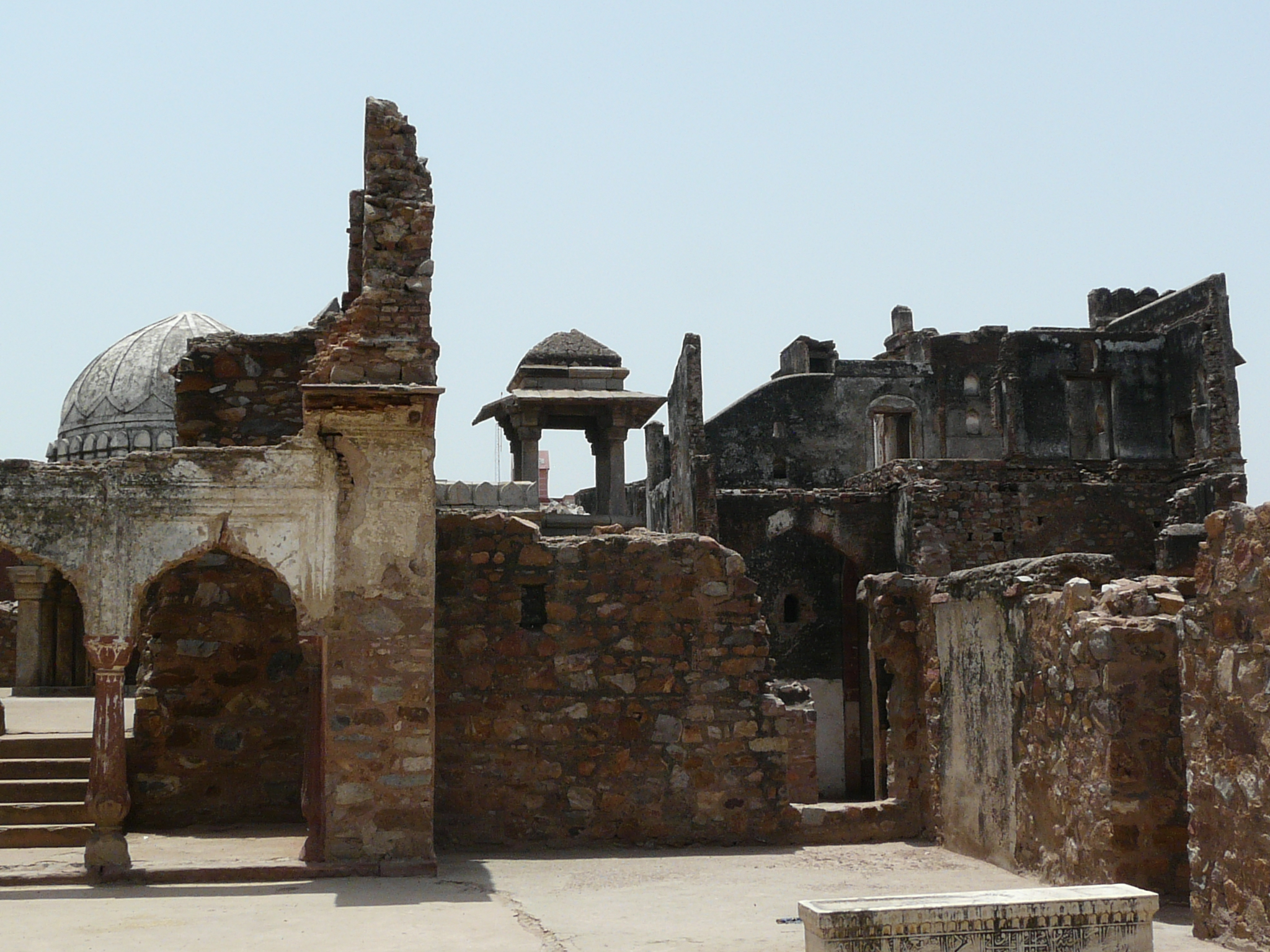
Zafar Mahal built first by Akbar Shah II in the 18th century with addition by Bahadur Shah Zafar II.

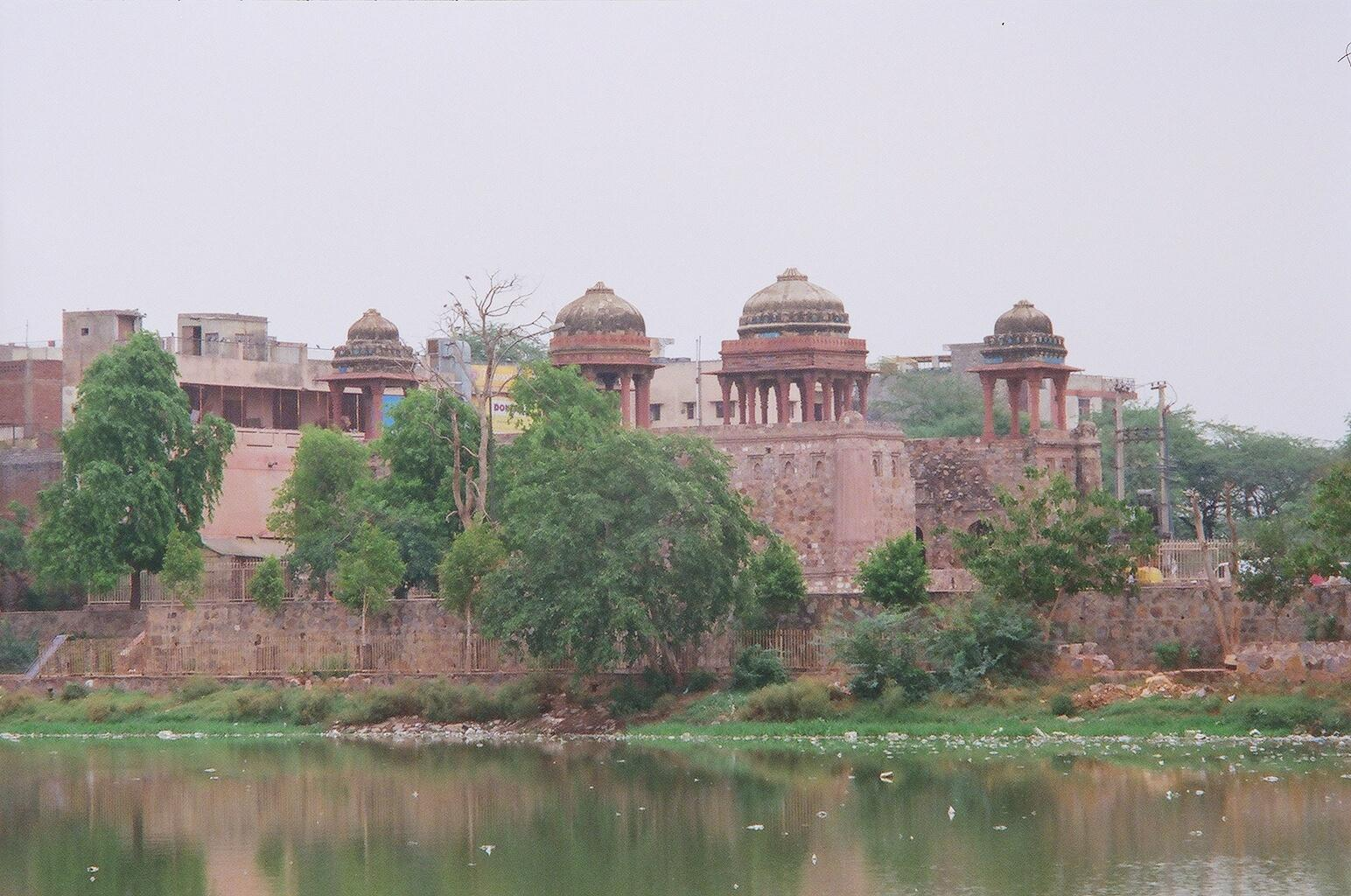
View of Jahaz Mahal from Hauz-i-Shamsi.

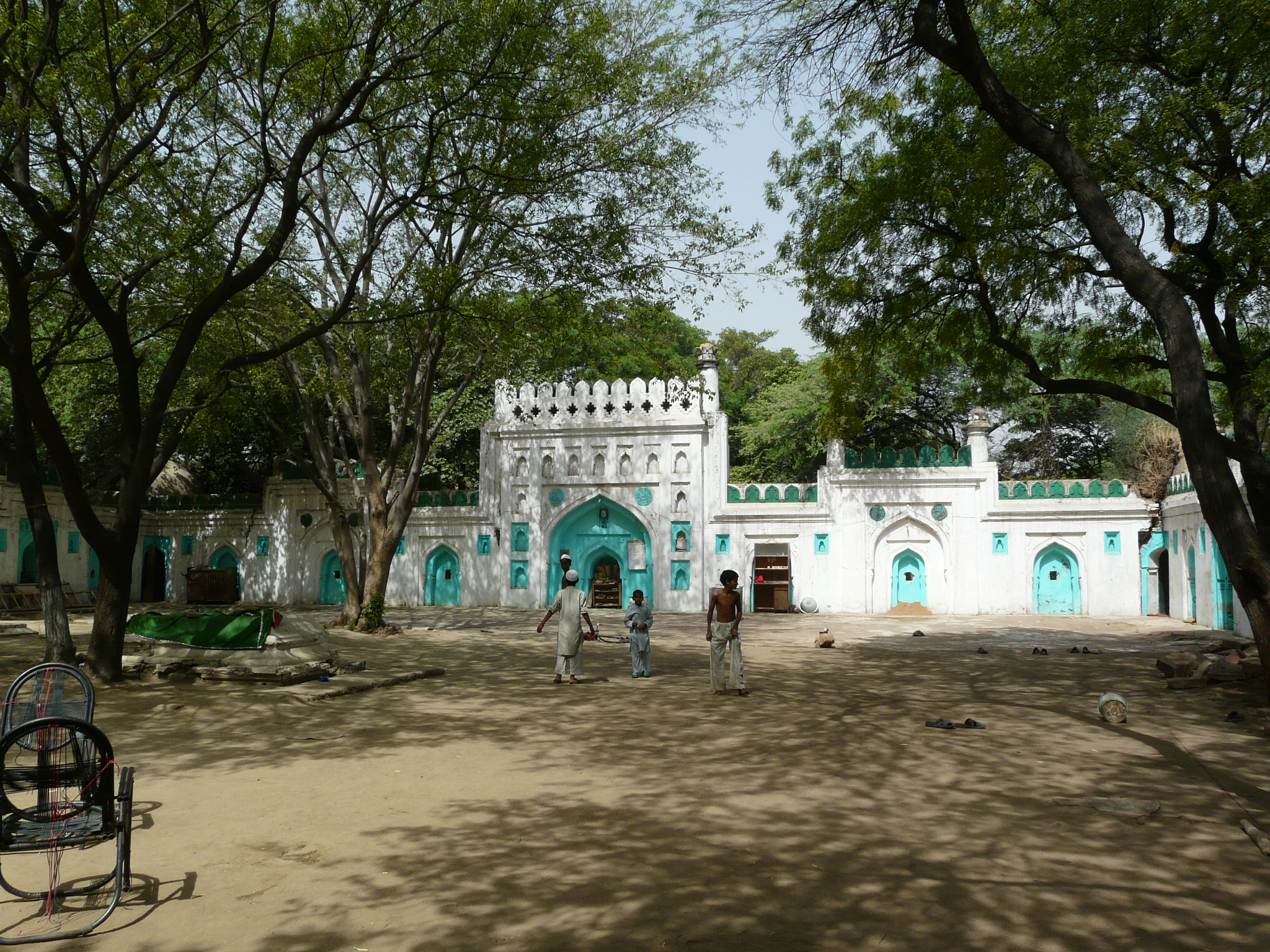
Bagichi Ki Masjid, Mehrauli Archeological Park

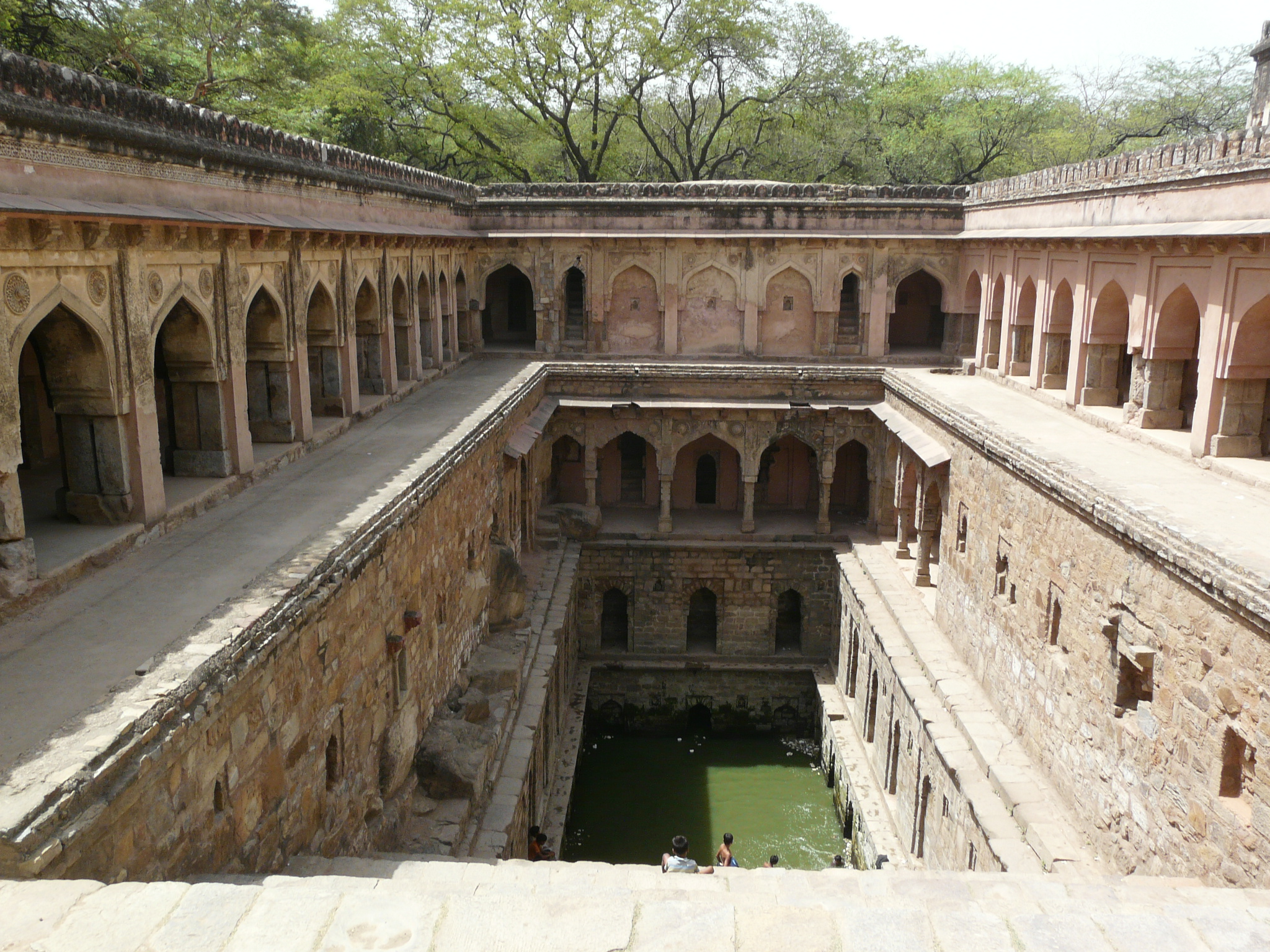
Rajon ki Baoli, the stepwell

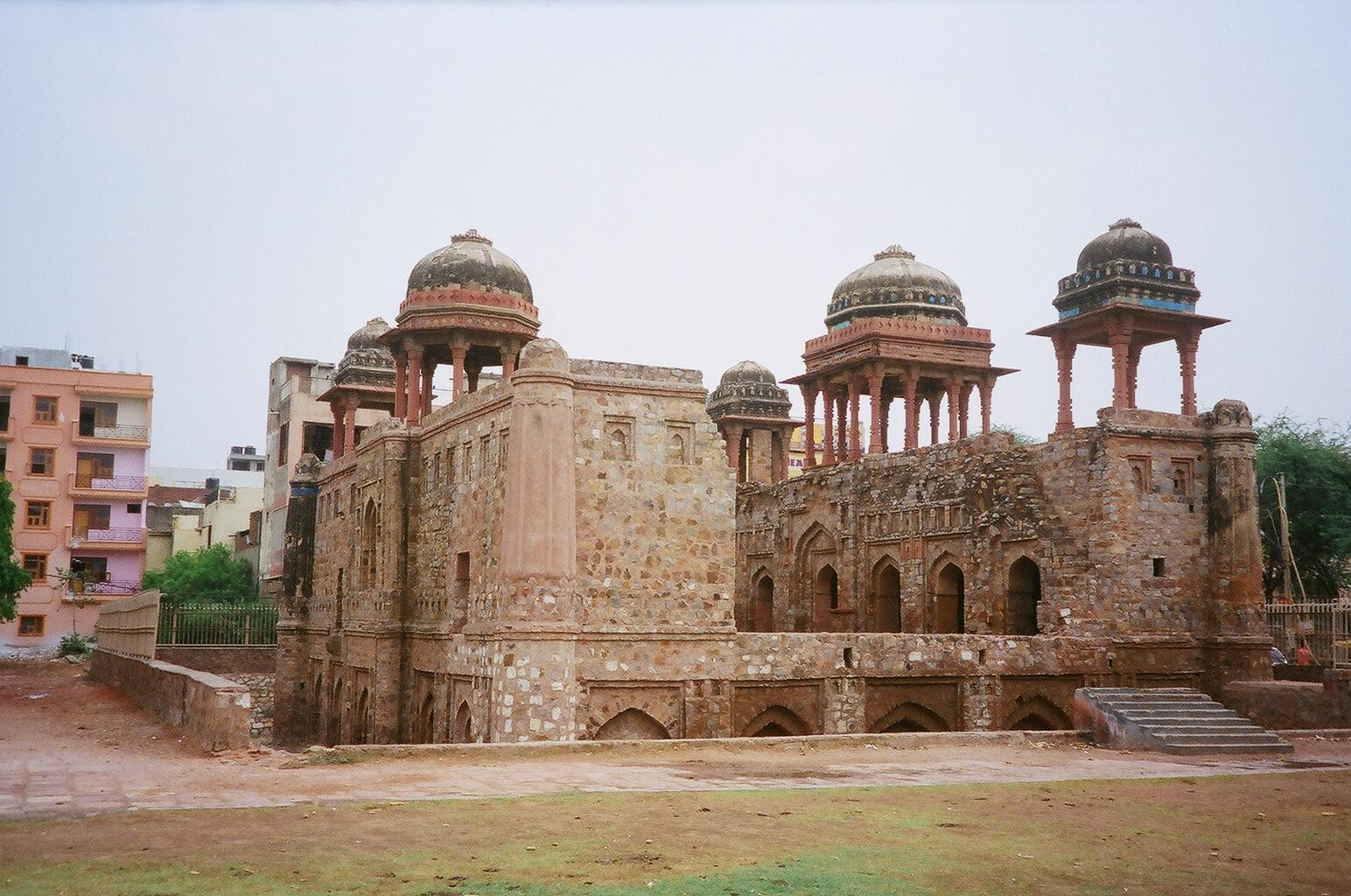
Jahaz Mahal on the bank of Hauz-i-Shamsi

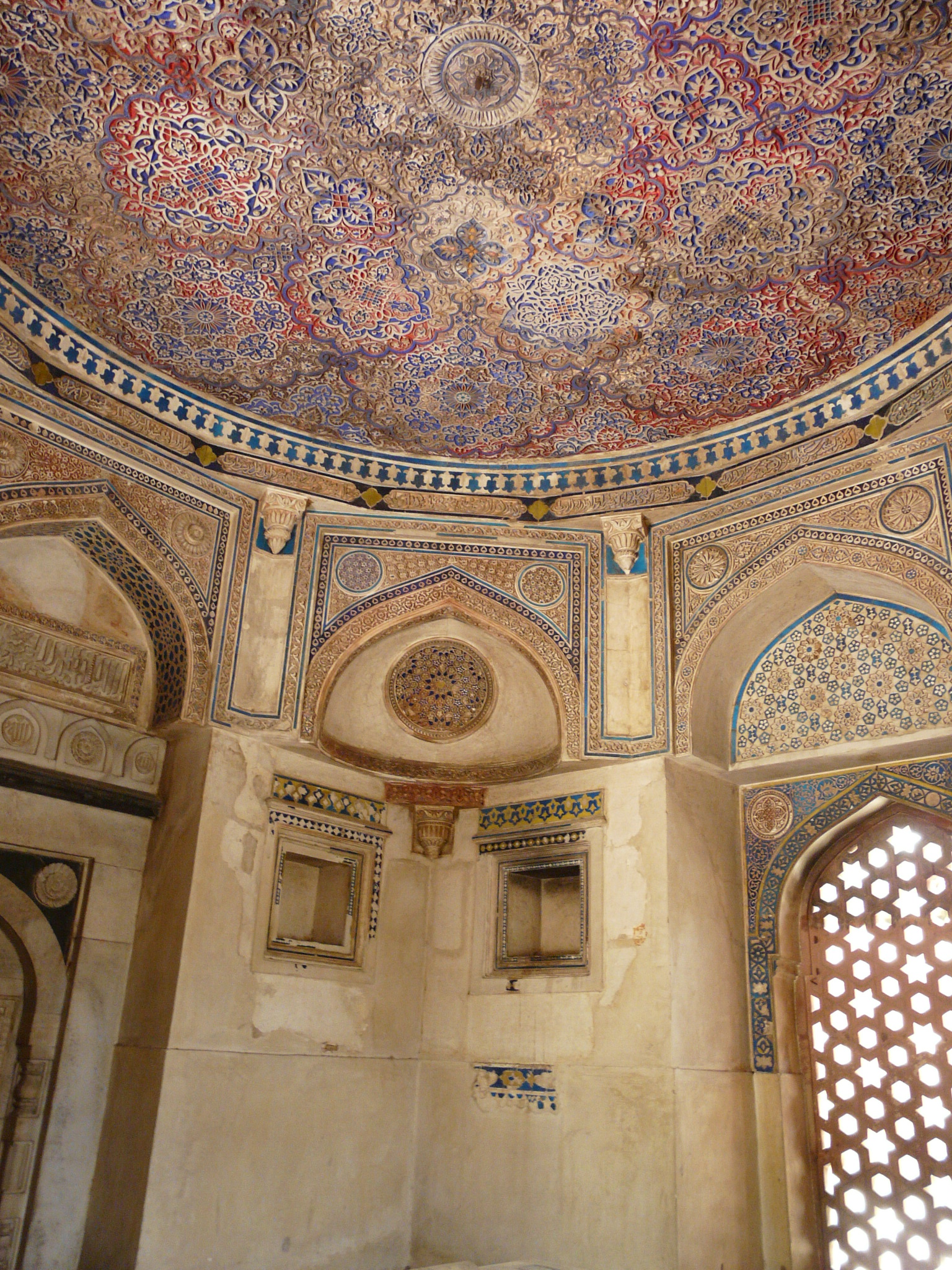
tahaJamali Kamali tomb interior

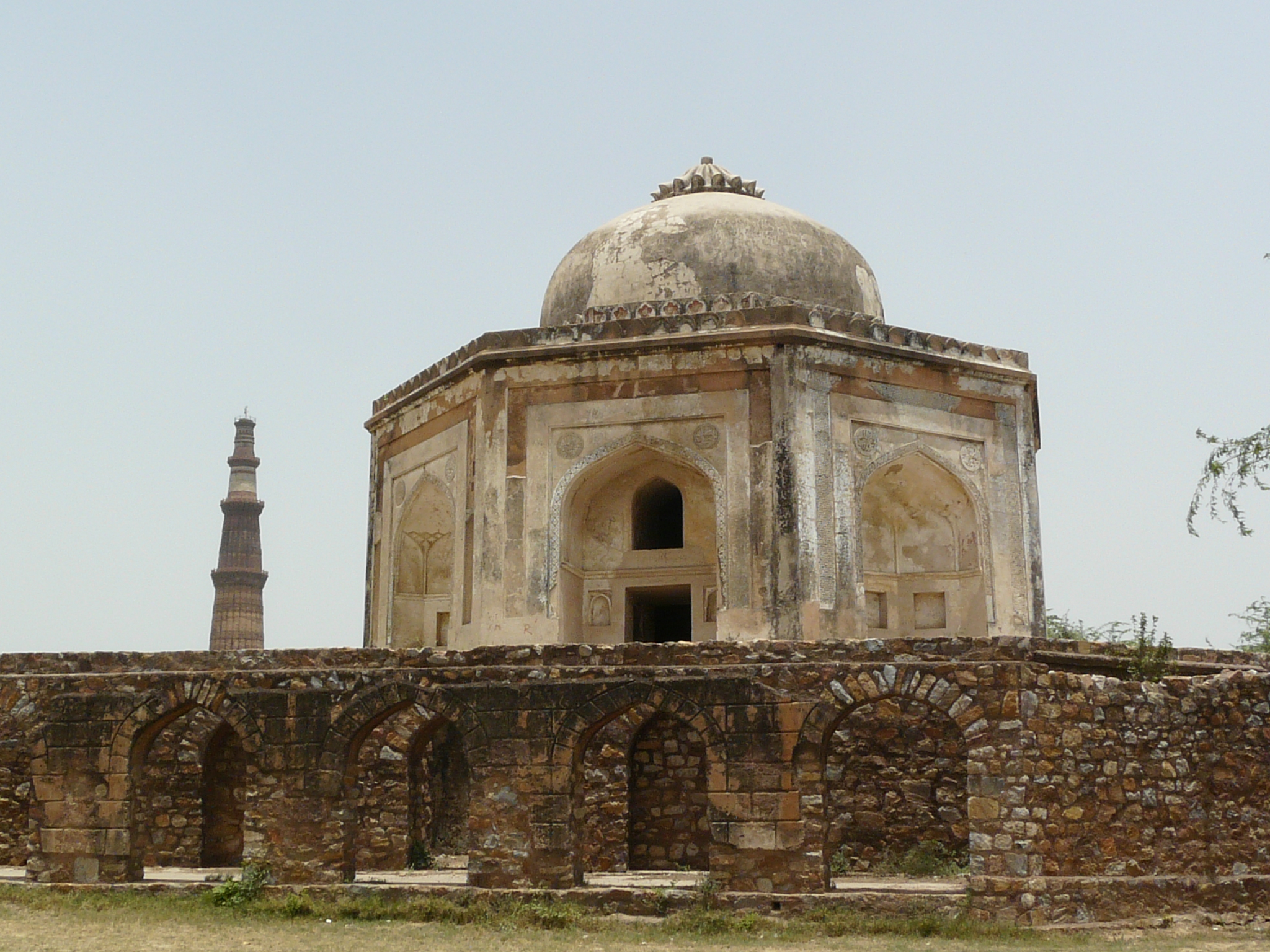
Tomb of Mohammad Quli Khan, brother of Adham Khan, a general of Mughal Emperor, Akbar, later turned into a country house Metcalfe House or Dilkusha by Sir Thomas Metcalfe, near Qutb complex

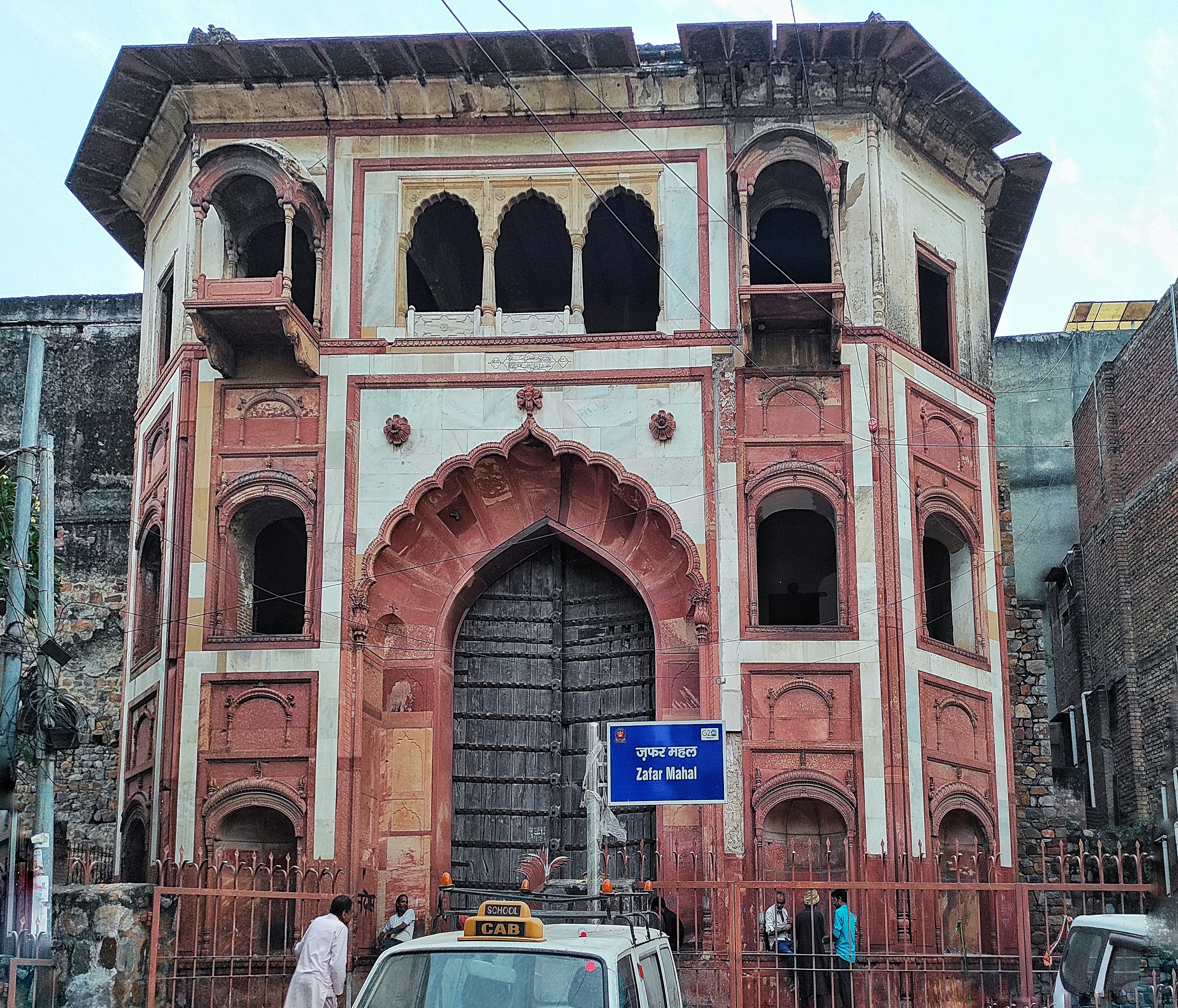
Zafar Mahal, the last monument built under the Mughal Empire.

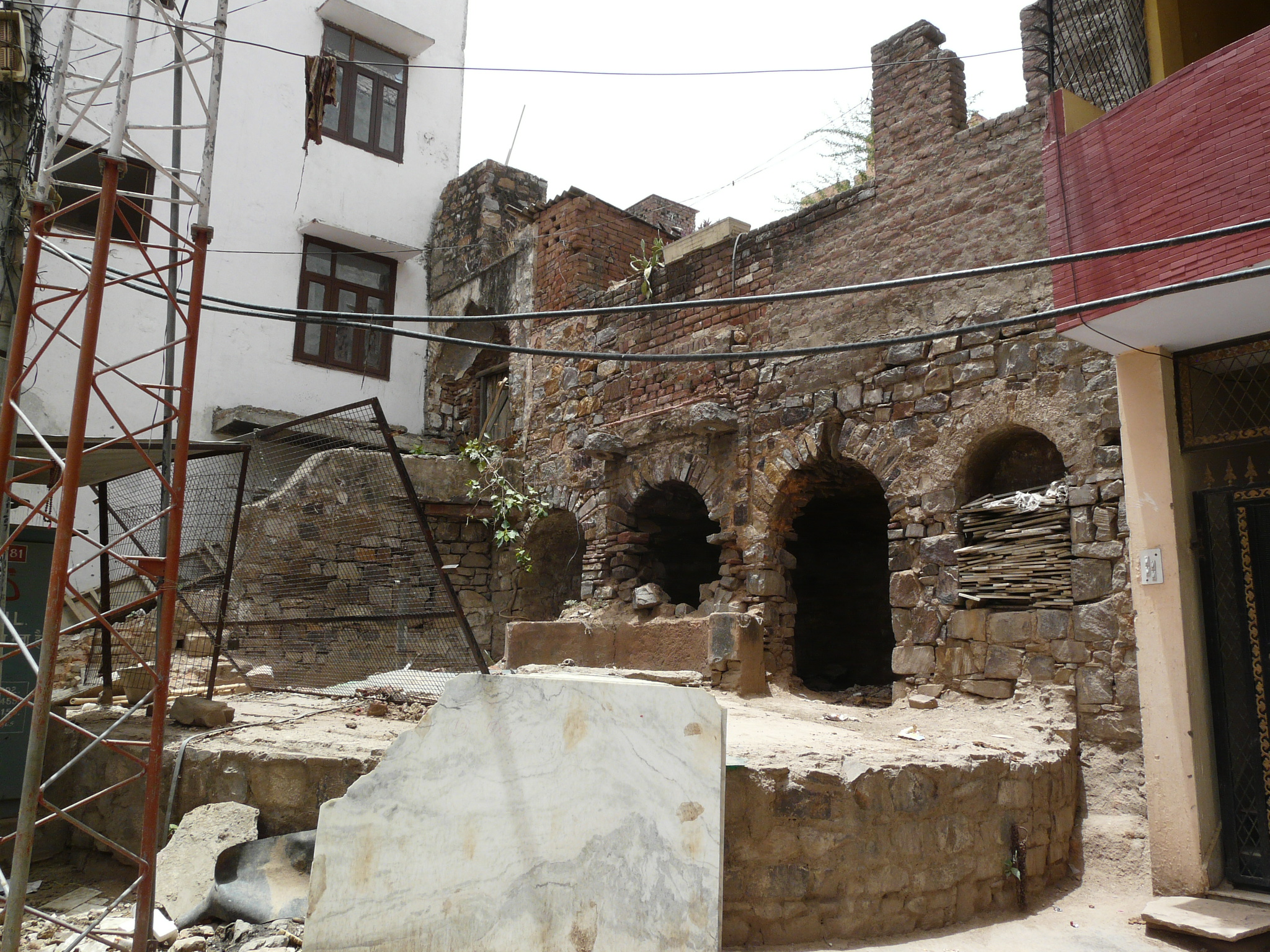
Remains of a baoli in Mehrauli.

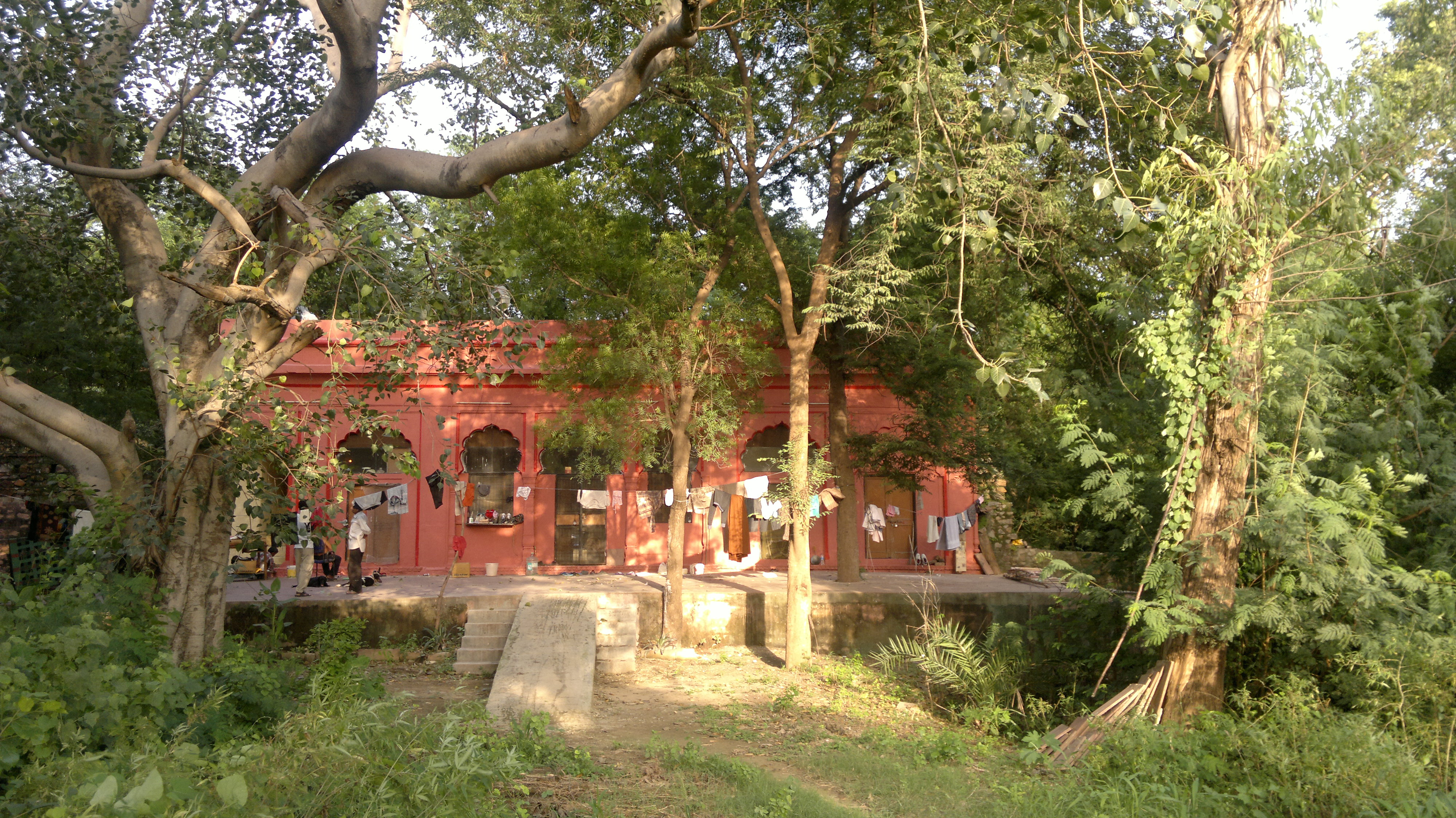
Pavilion in Baagh e Naazir.

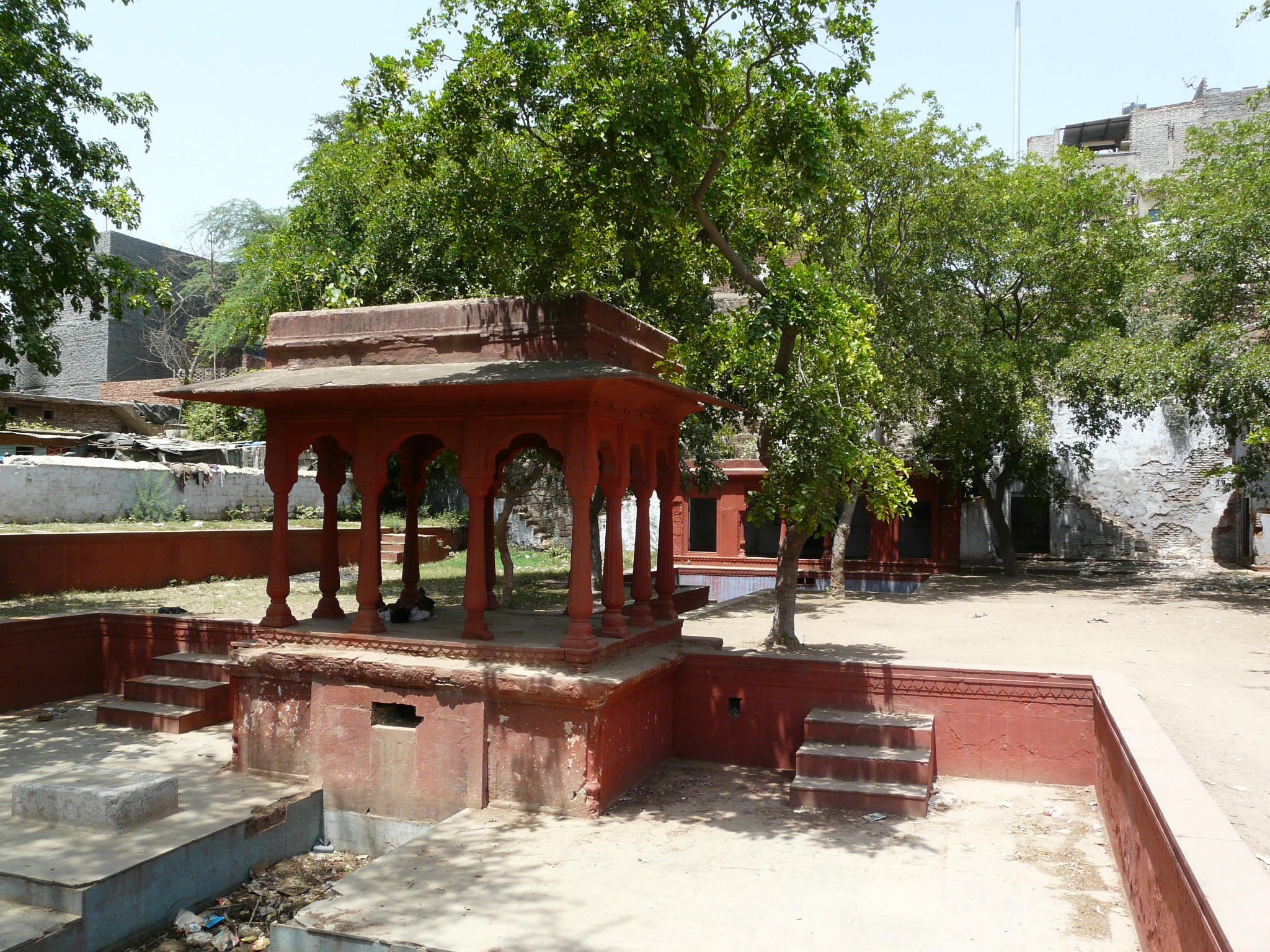
Jharna Mahal.

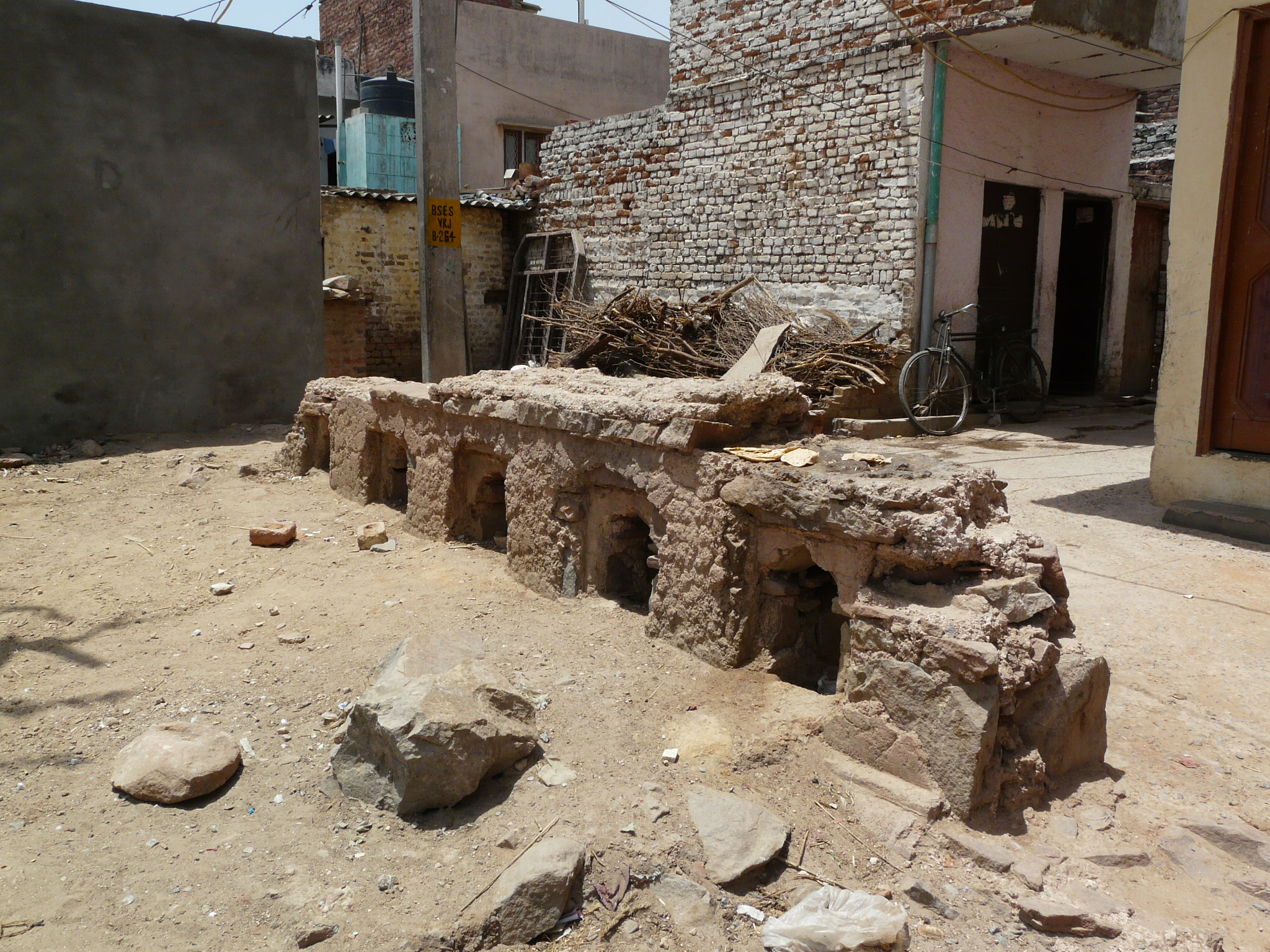
Ruins of a monument in Mehrauli.

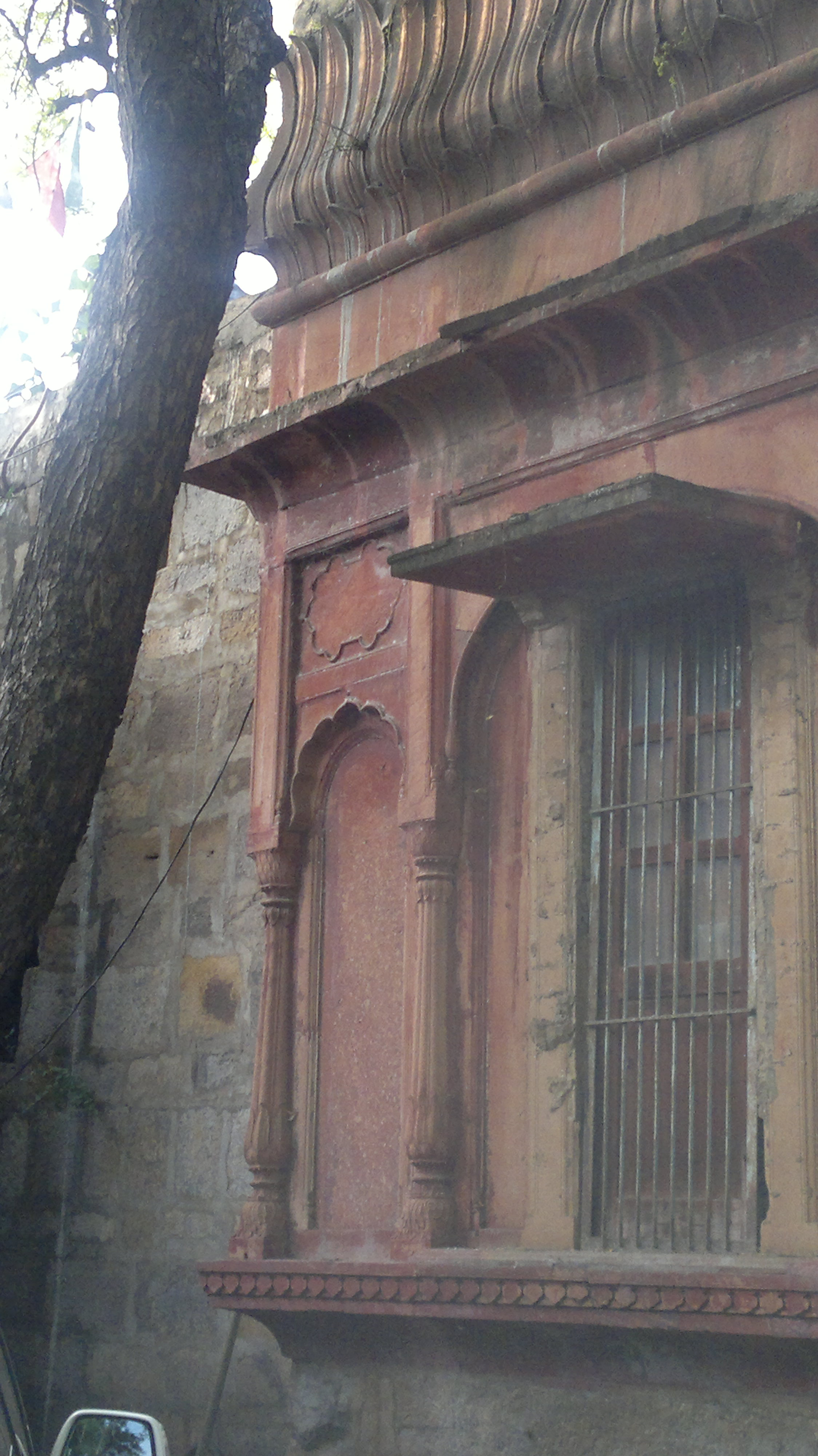
Mughal-era facade in Baagh e Naazir

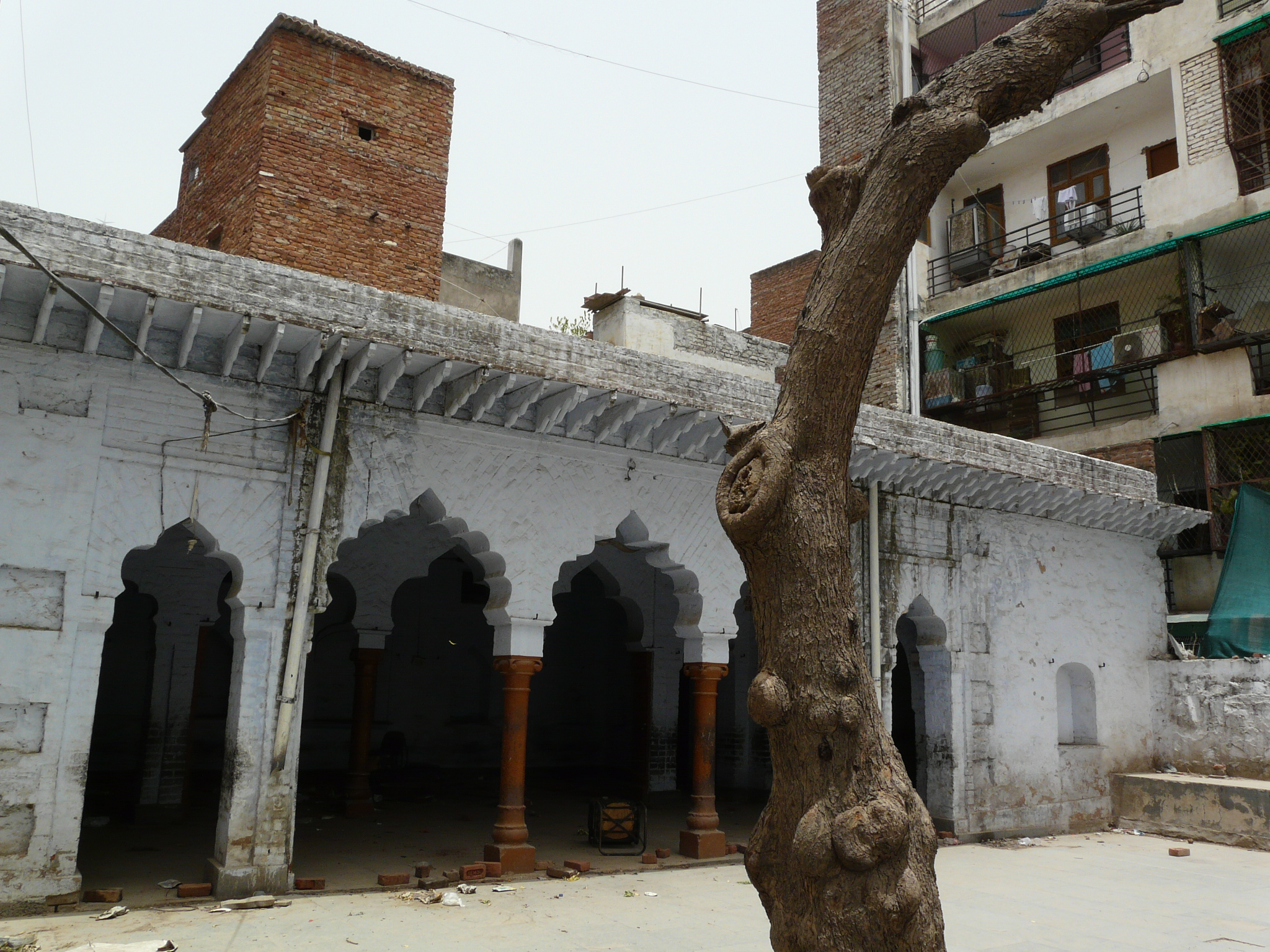
Dalan in Mehrauli.

== See also ==
- Neighbourhoods of Delhi
