= Baagh e Naazir =

- باغِ ناظر
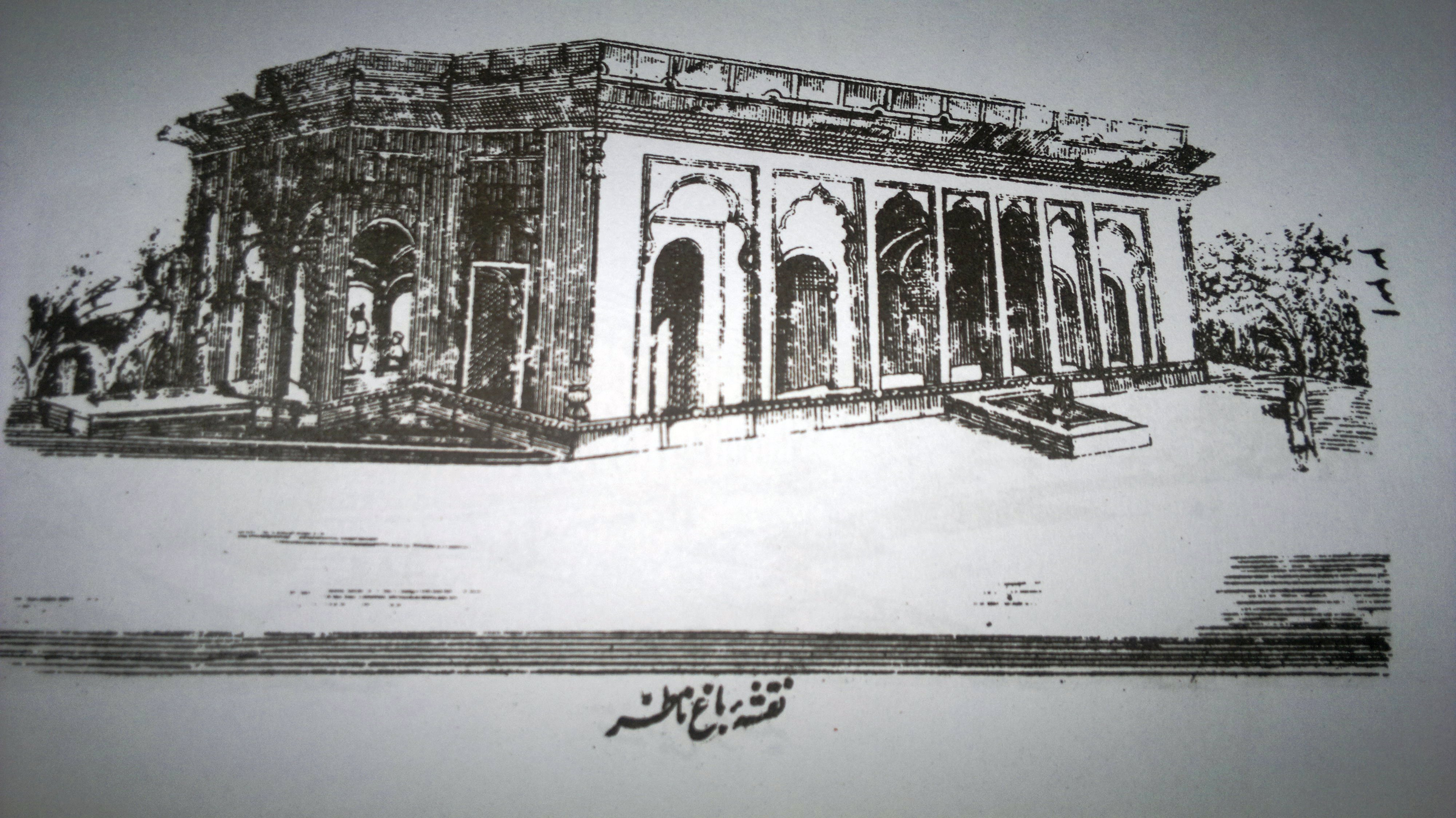
- Bagh e Naazir as it appeared in mid-19th century
- Year built: 1748

Baagh e Naazir باغِ ناظر; "Garden of Nazir") was built by the Mughal emperor Muhammad Shah Rangila's chief eunuch (Urdu: خواجہ سرا, romanized: Khwaja Sara) Nazir in 1748 (1161 A.H.). It is located in Mehrauli, near Jamali Kamali and Mehrauli Archaeological Park.

This garden contained a number of pavilions, the most notable among which was made of red sandstone. Others were made of stone and plaster. The garden was surrounded by a stone wall, large sections of which still exist.

Sir Syed Ahmad Khan's seminal work on the monuments of Delhi, Aasar us Sanadeed, contains a description and a sketch of the monument as it appeared in 1854.

The area has now been taken over by Ashoka Mission, a Buddhist organization.

== Gallery ==
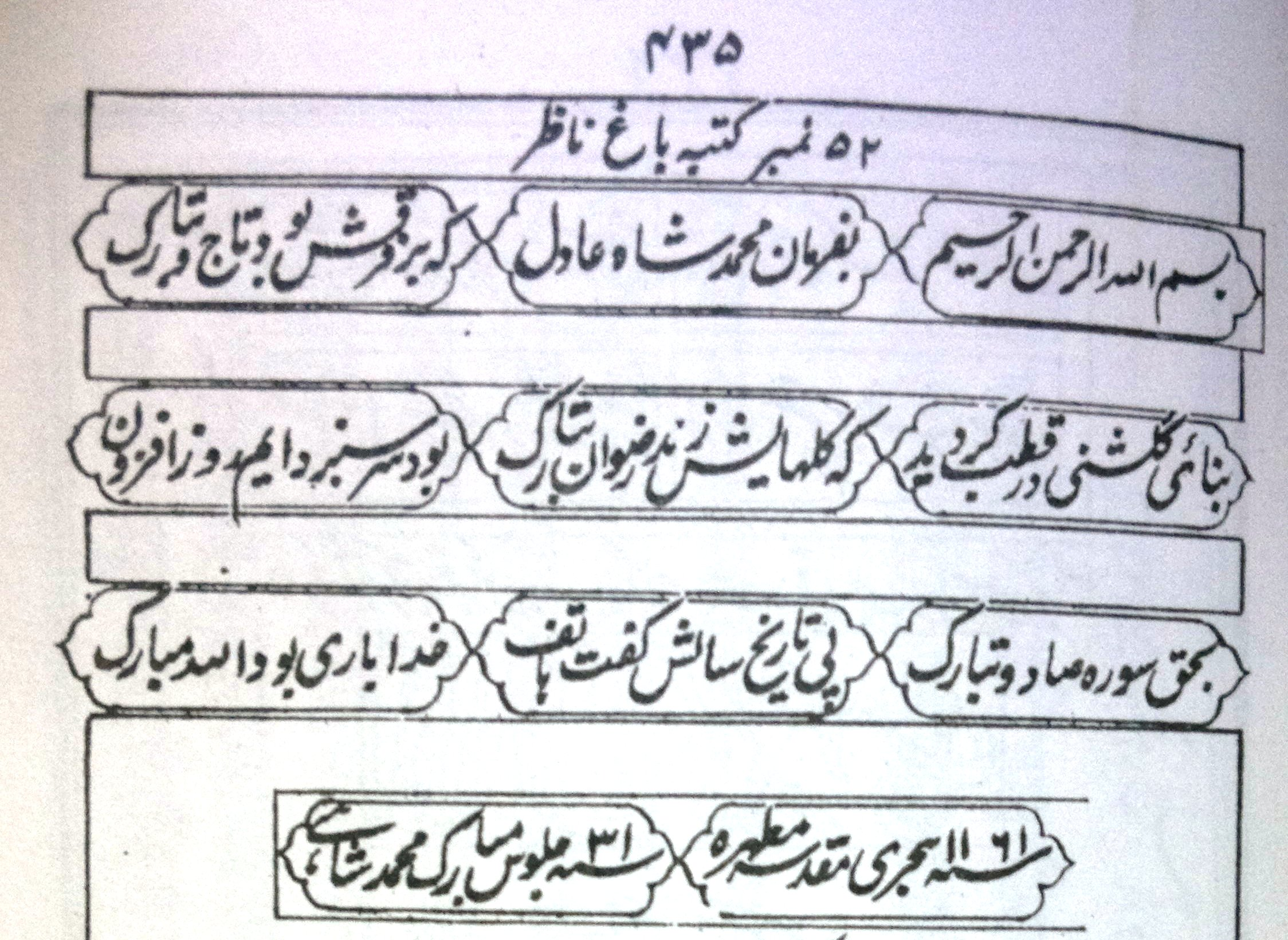
Inscription on the gateway of Bagh e Naazir, as recorded in Aasar us Sanadeed

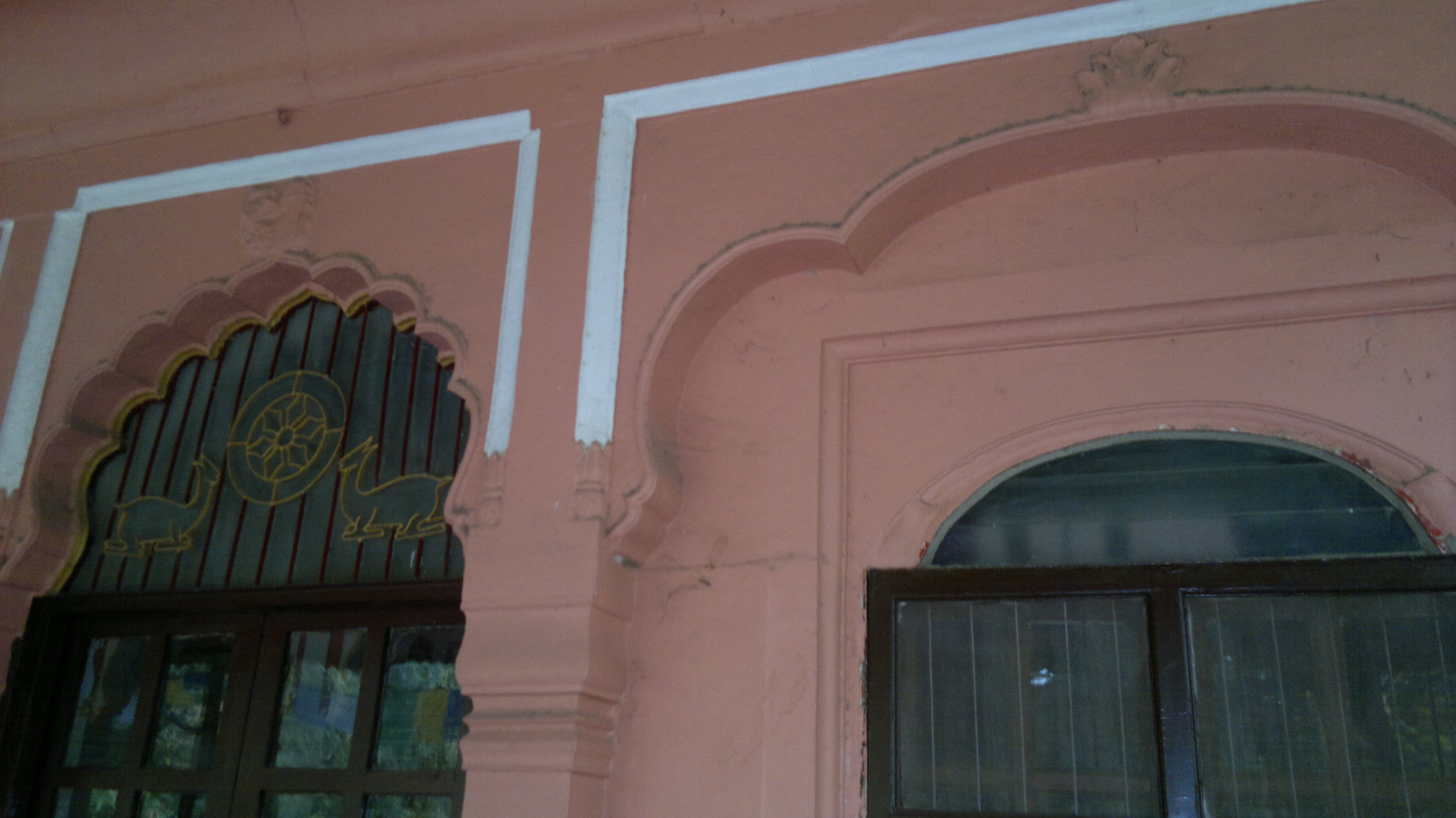
Buddhist shrine that used to be a dalan (pavilion), Baagh e Naazir, Mehrauli, New Delhi

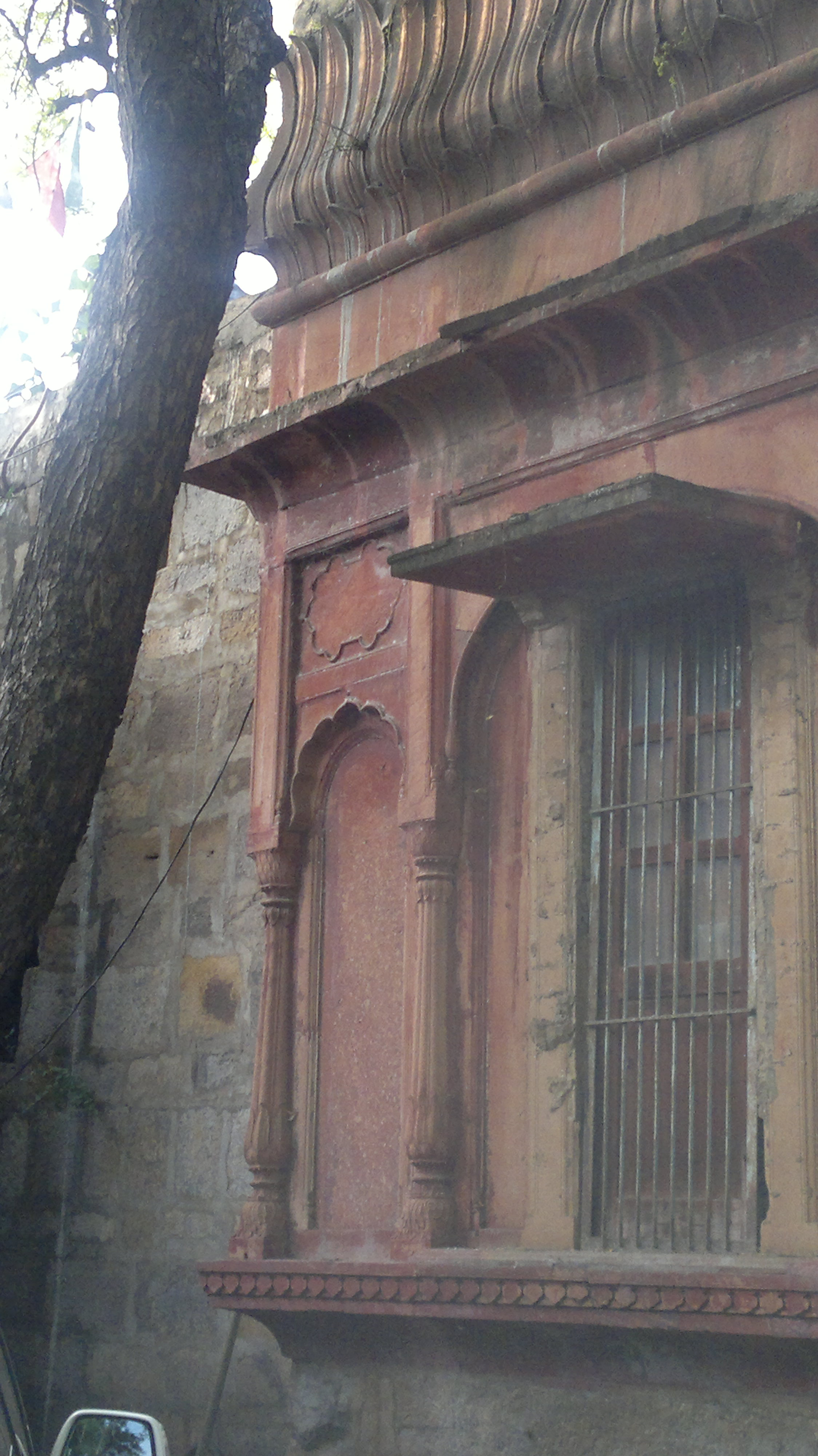
Late mughal sandstone facade at the back of the buddhist shrine, Baagh e Naazir, Mehrauli, New Delhi

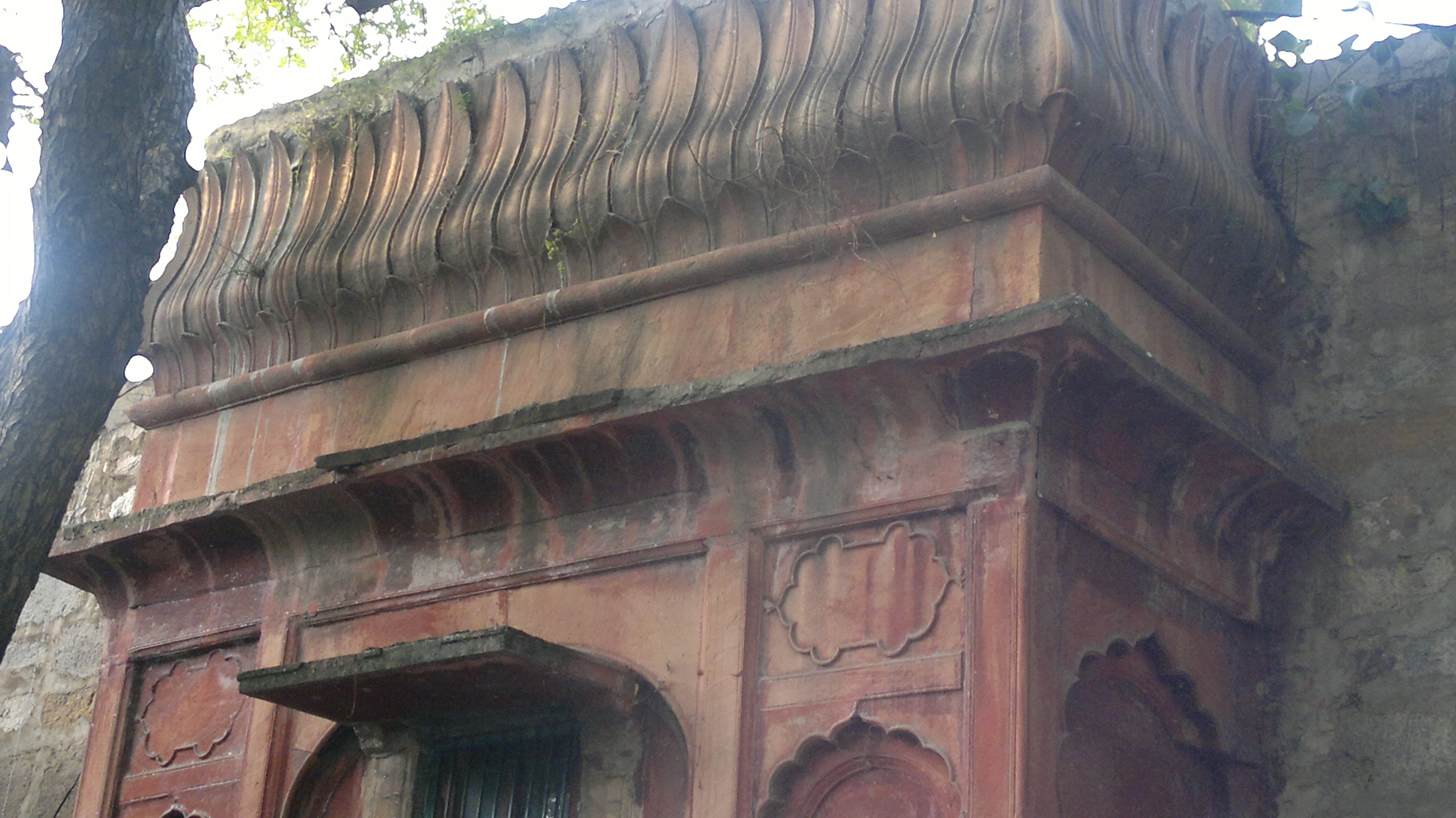
Detailed view of the sandstone facade, Baagh e Naazir, Mehrauli, New Delhi

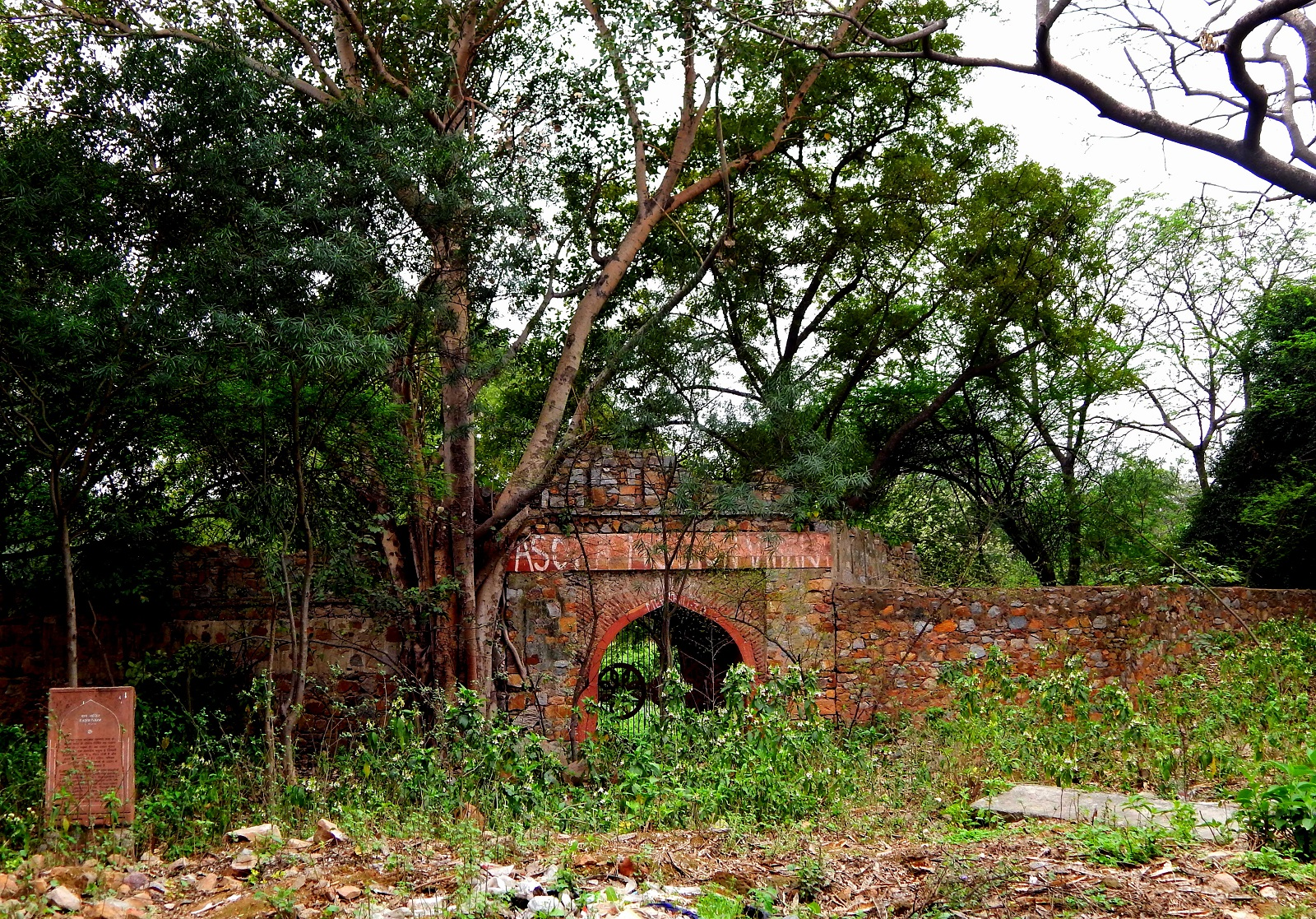
Built somewhat in 1720s by the chief Eunuch Nazir of Mughal emperor Muhammad Shah Rangeela. Monument also called Bagh-i-Nazir. Situated next to the Mehrauli Archaeological Park in Mehrauli area of Delhi, India.

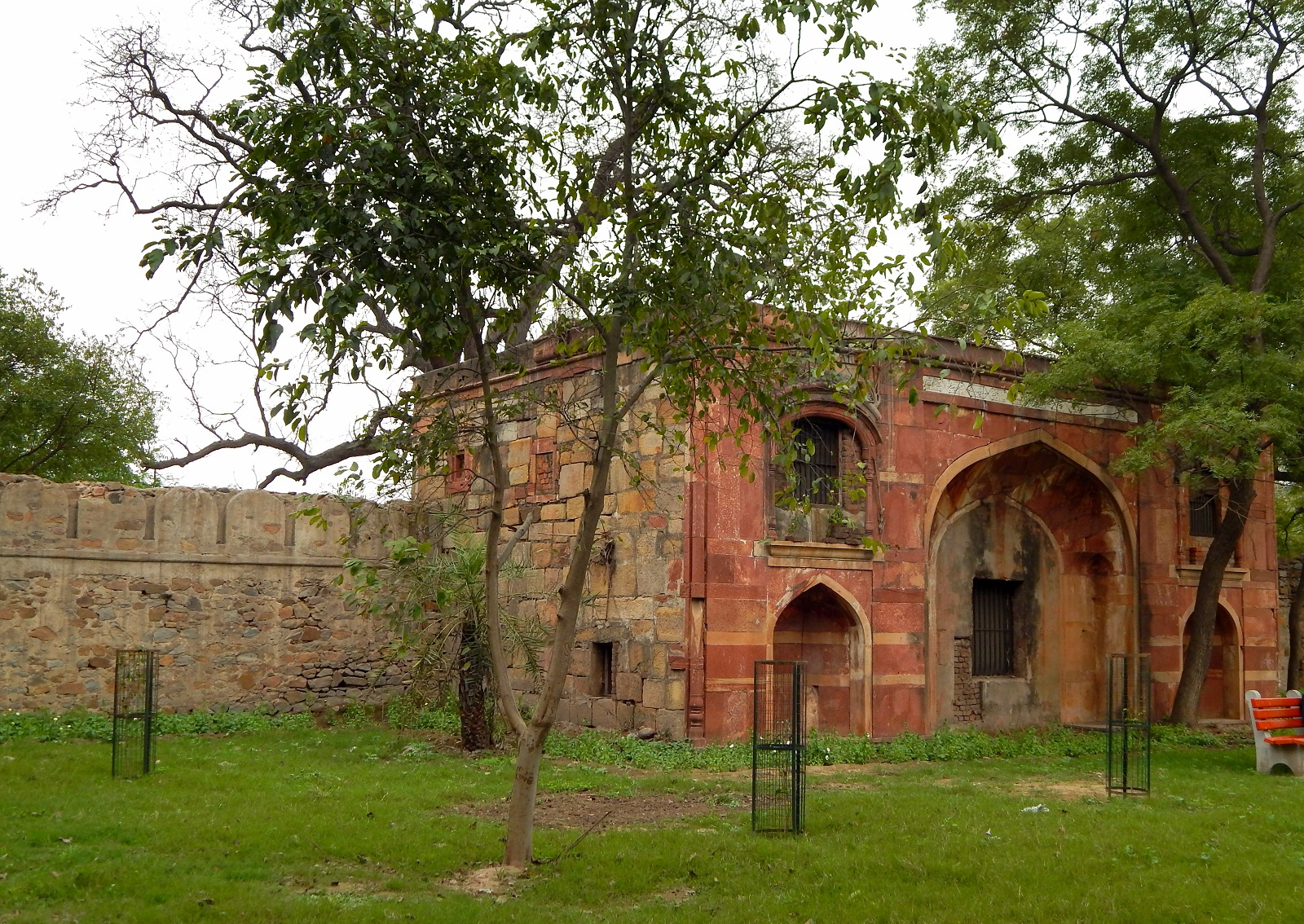
Walls and Gate of Nazir ka Bagh, Mehrauli, Delhi. Built by the Chief Eunuch "Nazir" in the court of Mughal Emperor Muhammad Shah Rangeela

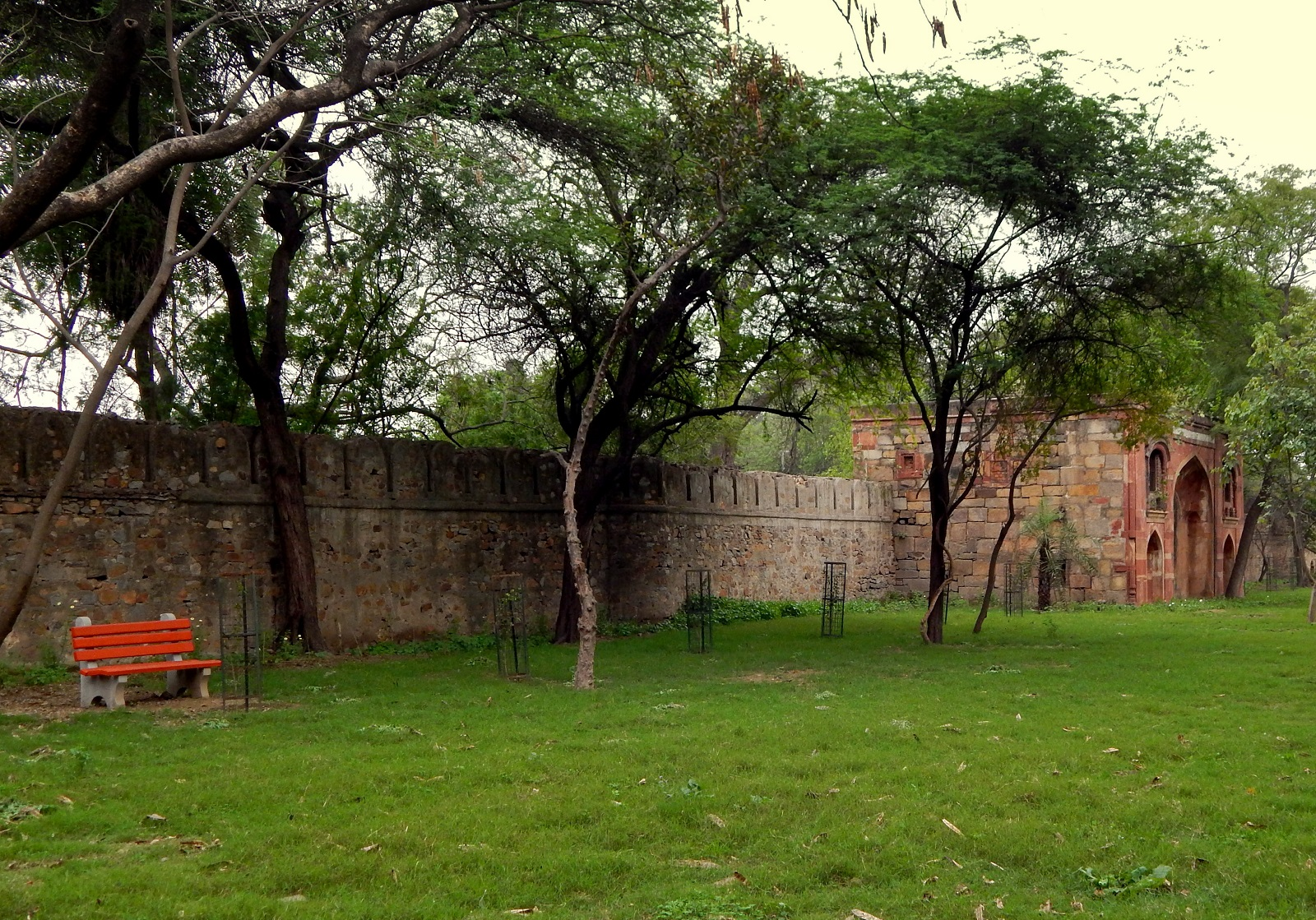
Gateway and walls of Bagh e Naazir or Nazir ka Bagh or the Garden of Nazir. Nazir was the Chief Eunuch in the court of Mughal Emperor Muhammad Shah Rangeela.
