= Tomb of Balban =

Tomb in New Delhi, India

Coordinates: 28°31′10″N 77°11′19″E

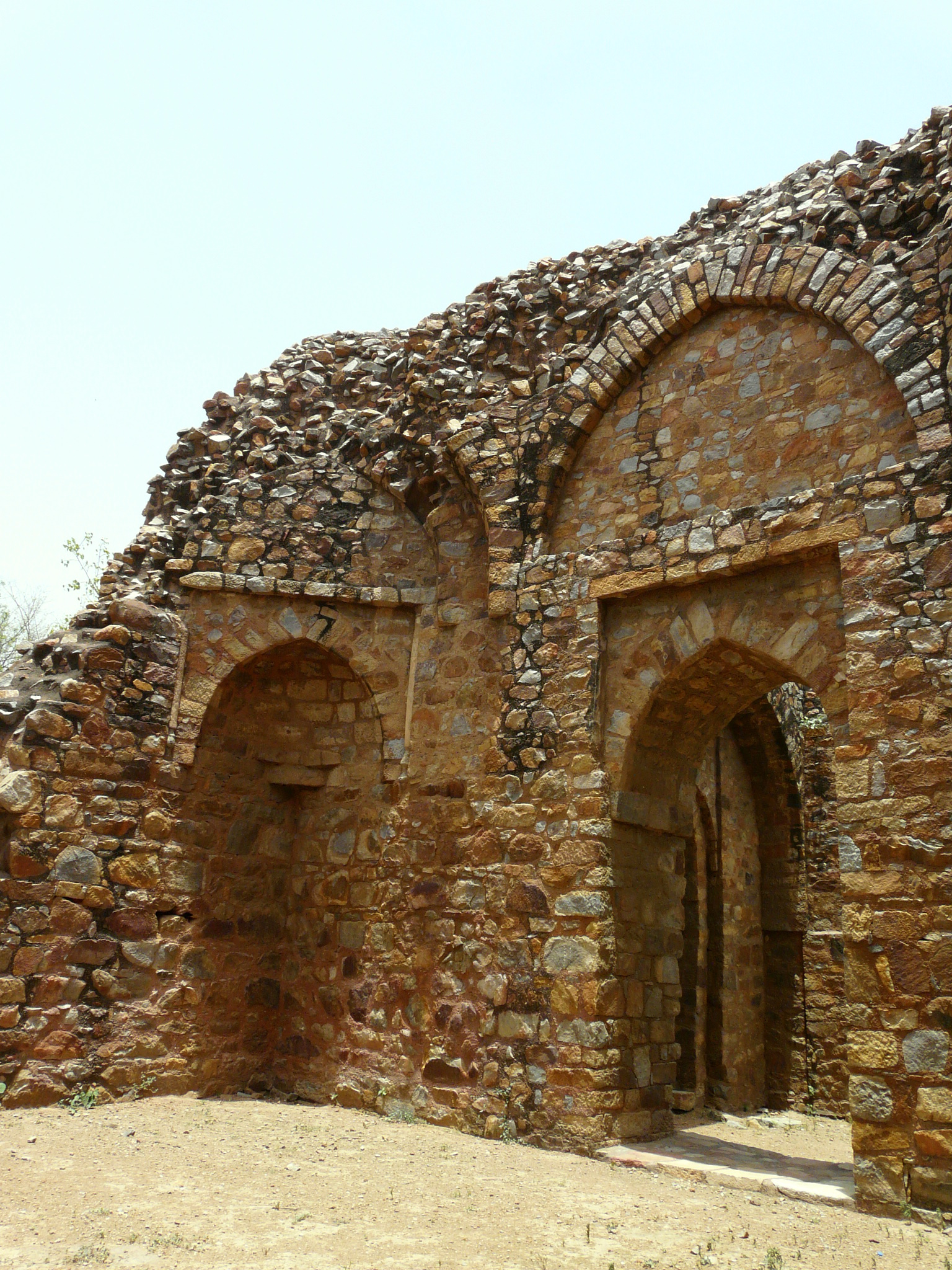
Balban's tomb, Mehrauli Archaeological Park

The Tomb of Ghiyas ud din Balban is located in Mehrauli Archaeological Park, Mehrauli, southern part of New Delhi, India. Built in circa 1287 CE in rubble masonry, the tomb is a building of historical importance in the development of Indo-Islamic architecture, as it was here that first Islamic arch made its appearance in India, and according to many, the first Islamic dome as well, which however hasn't survived, making Alai Darwaza built in 1311 CE, in the nearby Qutb complex, the earliest surviving dome in India. Ghiyas ud din Balban (1200–1287) was a Turkic ruler of the Delhi Sultanate during the rule of Mamluk dynasty of Delhi (or Slave dynasty) from 1266 to 1287. He was one of the most prominent rulers of the Slave Dynasty. The tomb of Balban was discovered in the mid-20th century.

== Overview ==
It is an imposing stone and masonry building, though lacking the splendid ornamentation to be seen in the tomb of his master, Iltutmish. The tomb is surrounded by the ruins of an extensive late-medieval settlement and it offers, from certain angles, a remarkable view of the Qutub Minar. To the east of Balban's tomb, lies a ruined rectangular structure said to be the grave of Khan Shahid, Balban's son, whose original name was Muhammad, who died fighting against the Mongols near Multan in 1285.

== Gallery ==
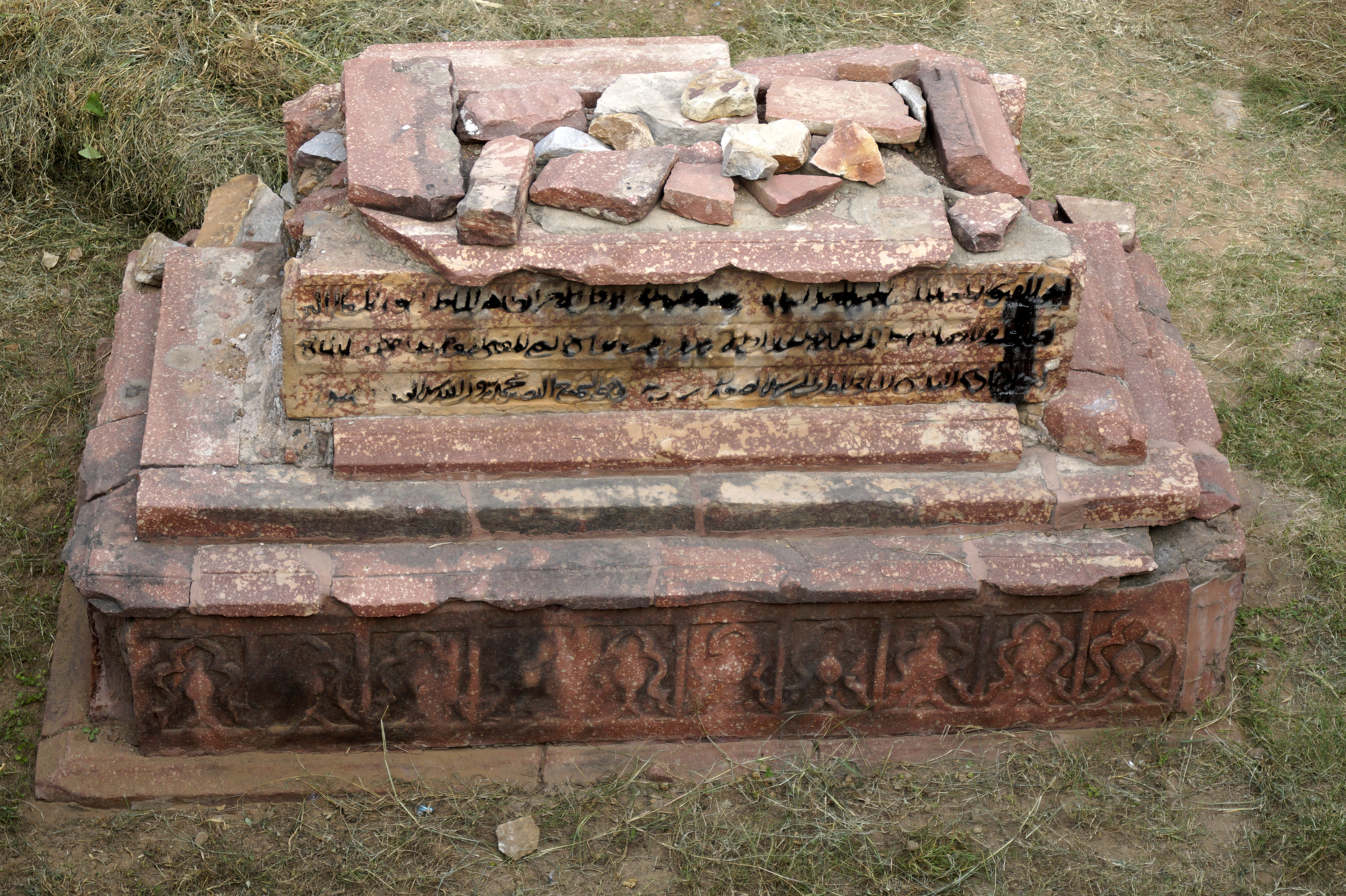
Grave of Balban's son

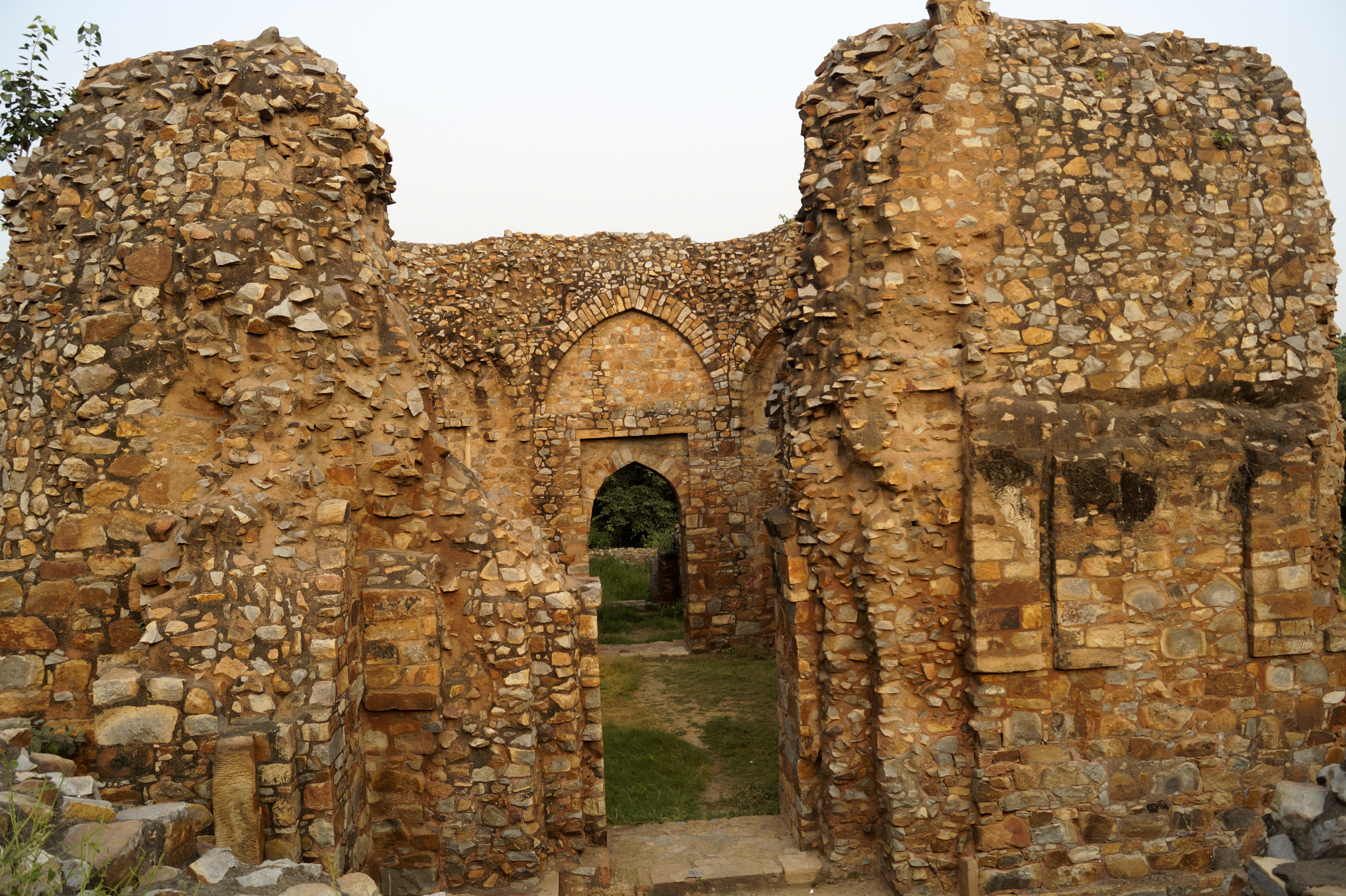
Tomb of Balban, Mehrauli -(As on 28-09-2016)

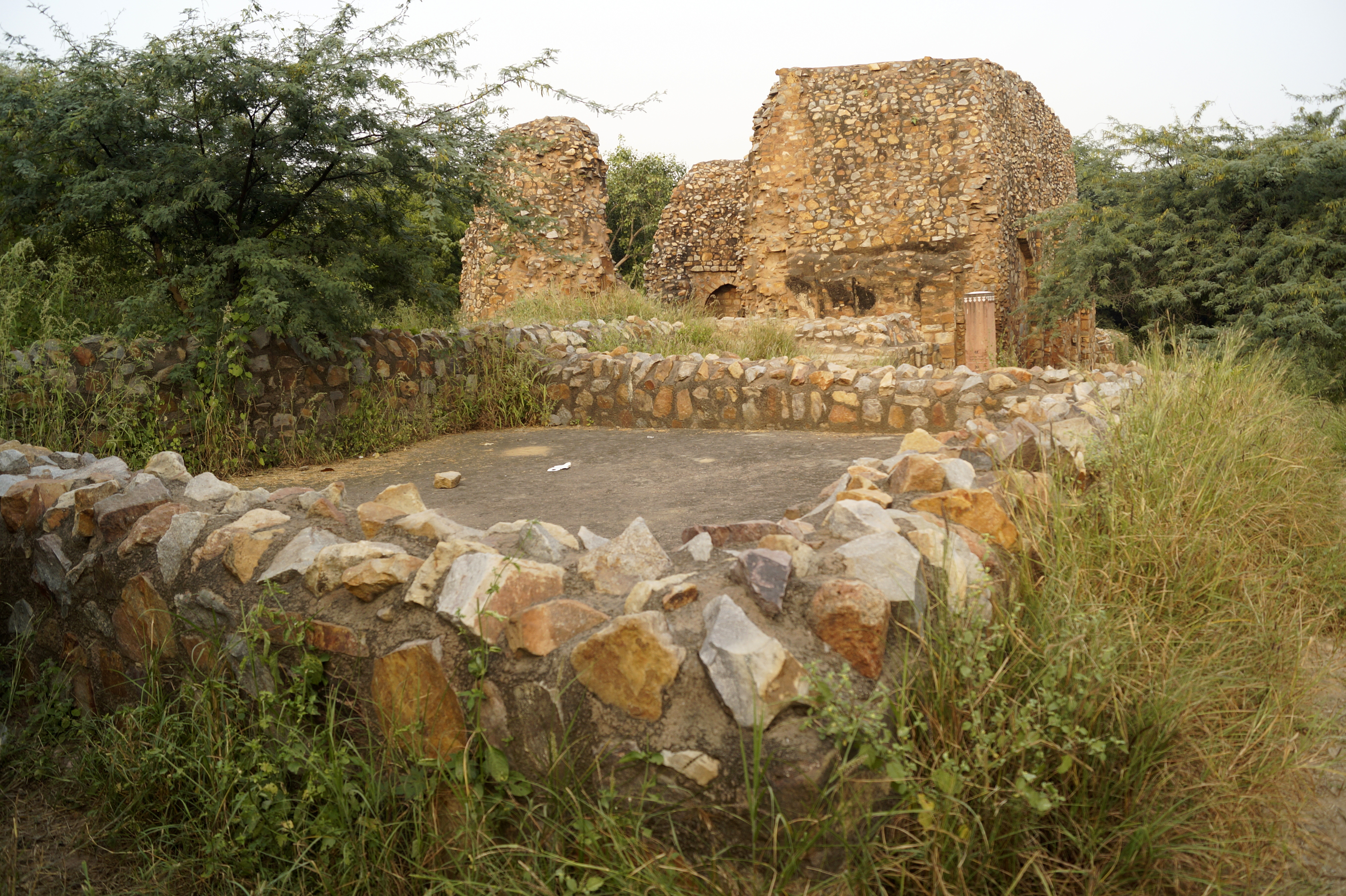
Ruins of tomb of Balban-(As on 28-09-2016)

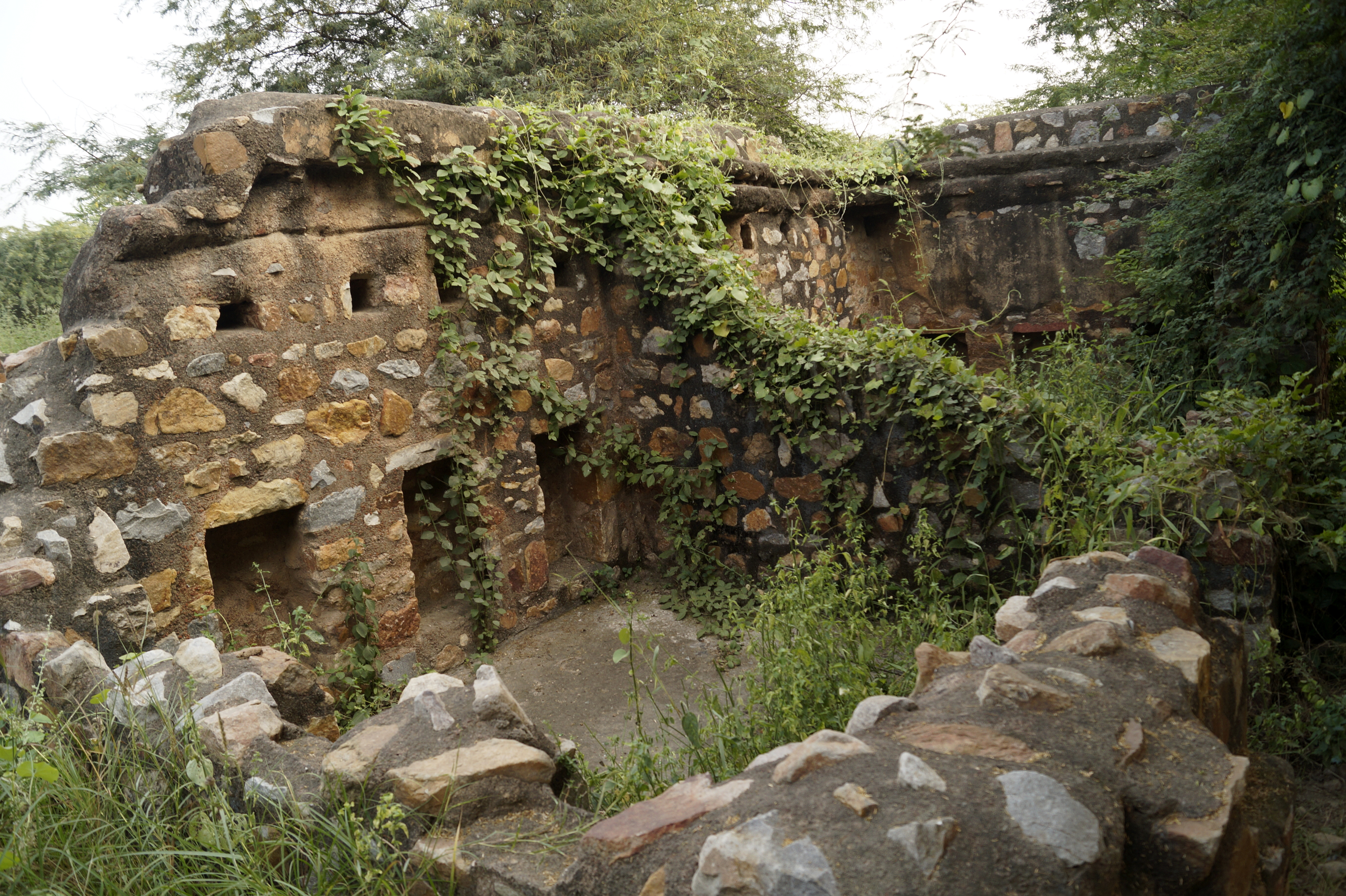
Ruins of structure adjoining the tomb of Balban

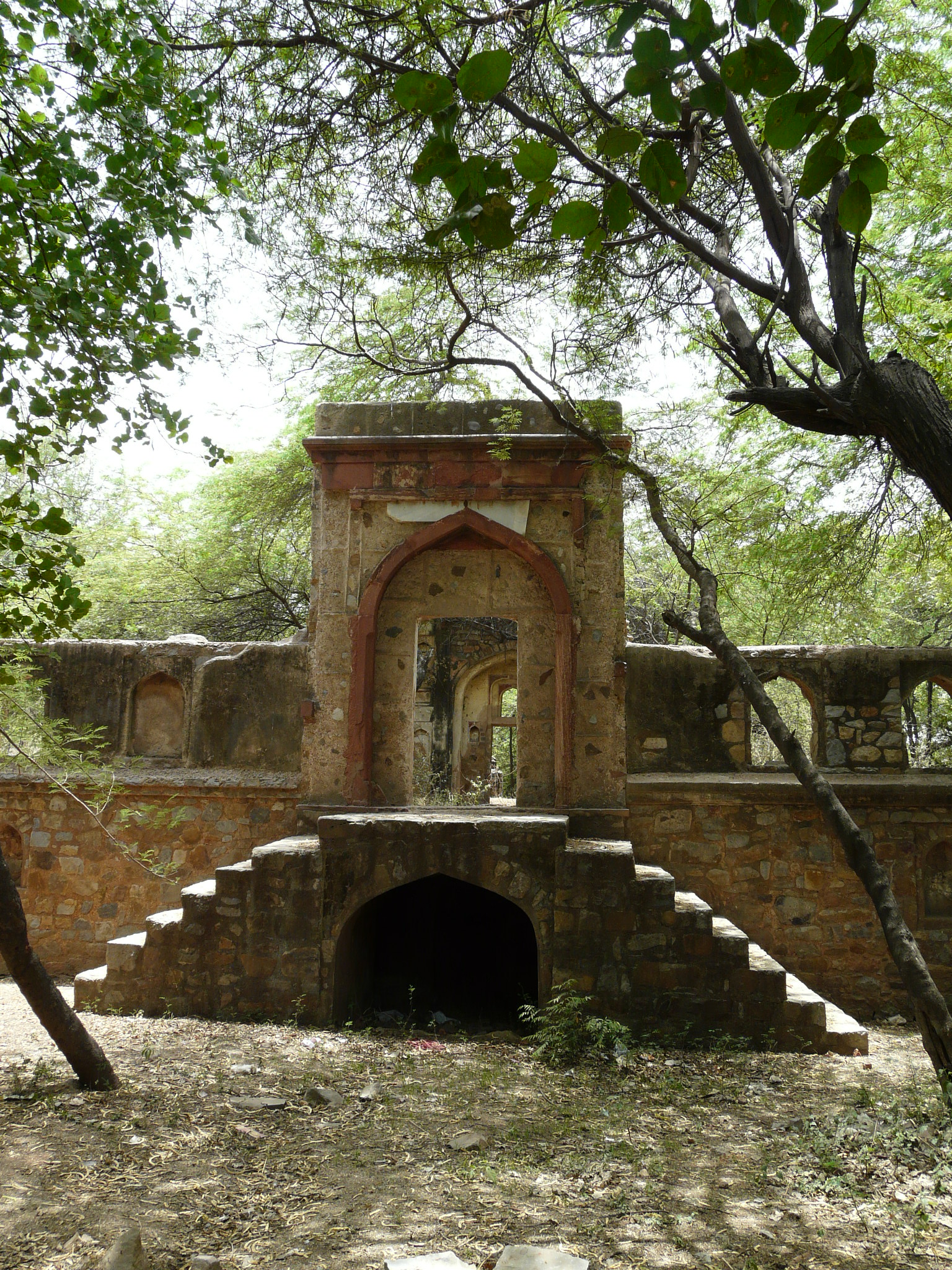
Entrance to Tomb of Khan Shahid, Mehrauli

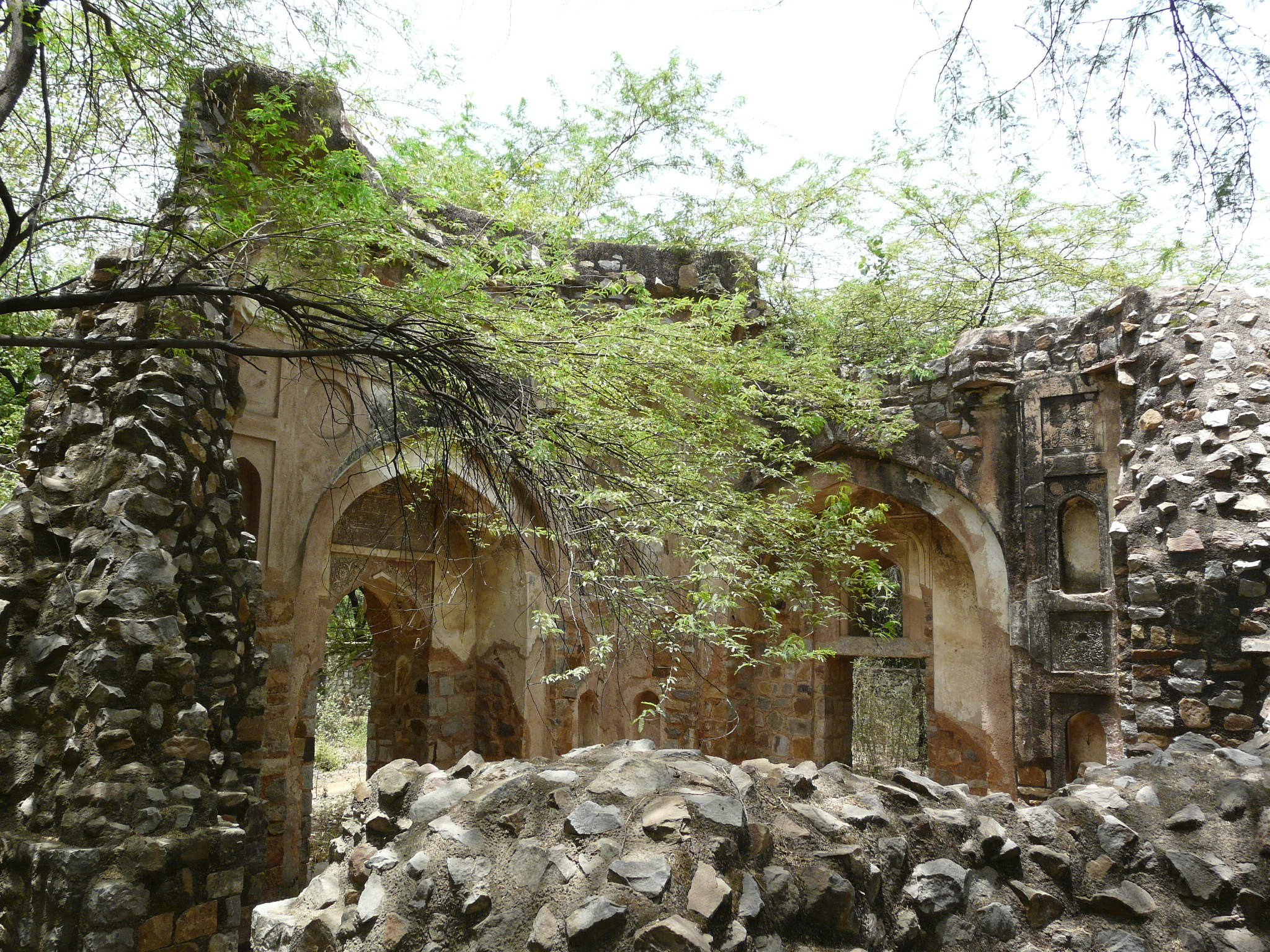
Tomb of Khan1 Shahid, Balban's son, Mehrauli

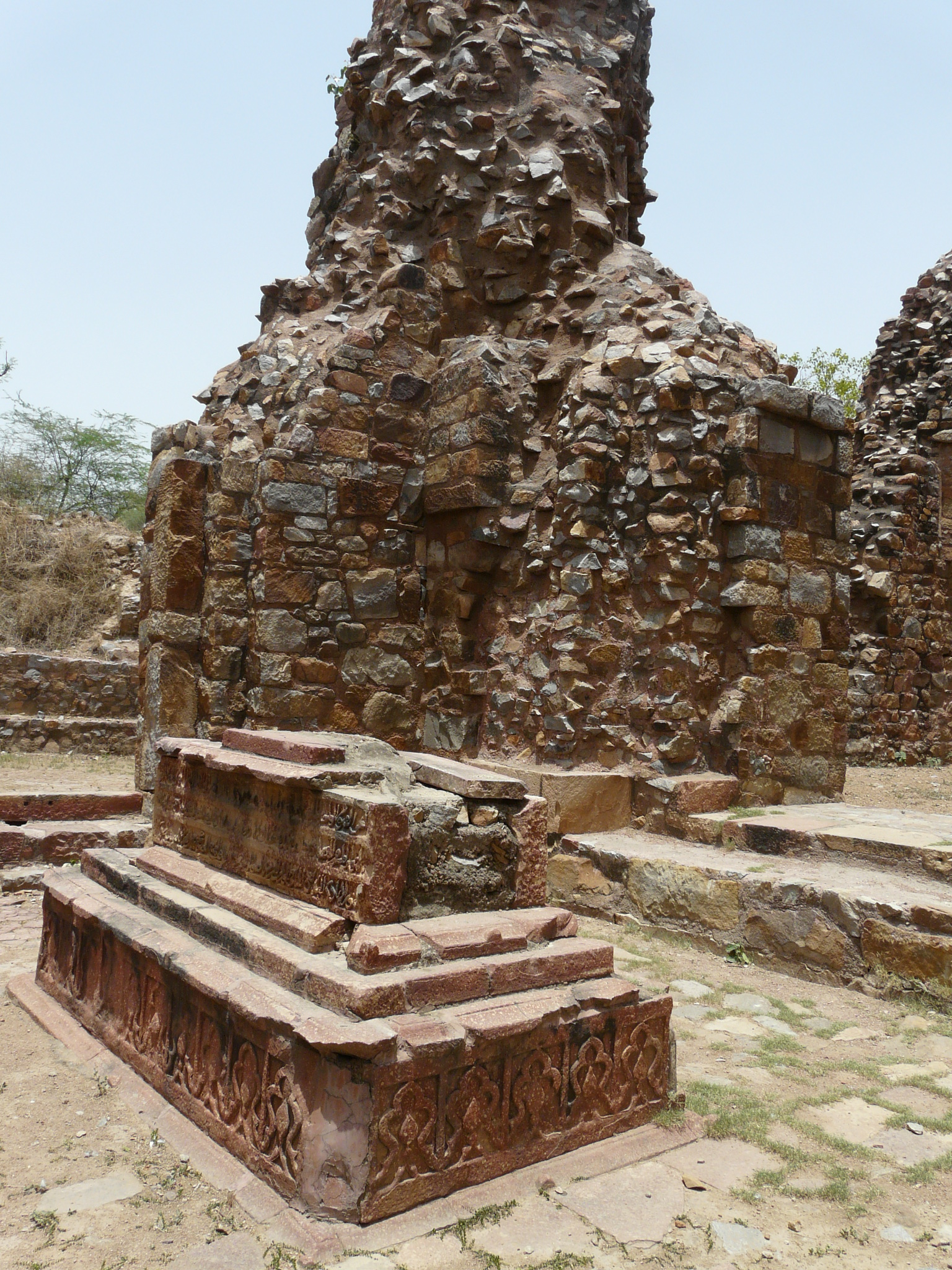
Grave in Balban's tomb enclosure, Mehrauli
