= Mehrauli Archaeological Park =

Archaeological park in India

- महरौली
- Interactive map of Mehrauli Archaeological Park
- Coordinates: 28.5204°N 77.1818°E

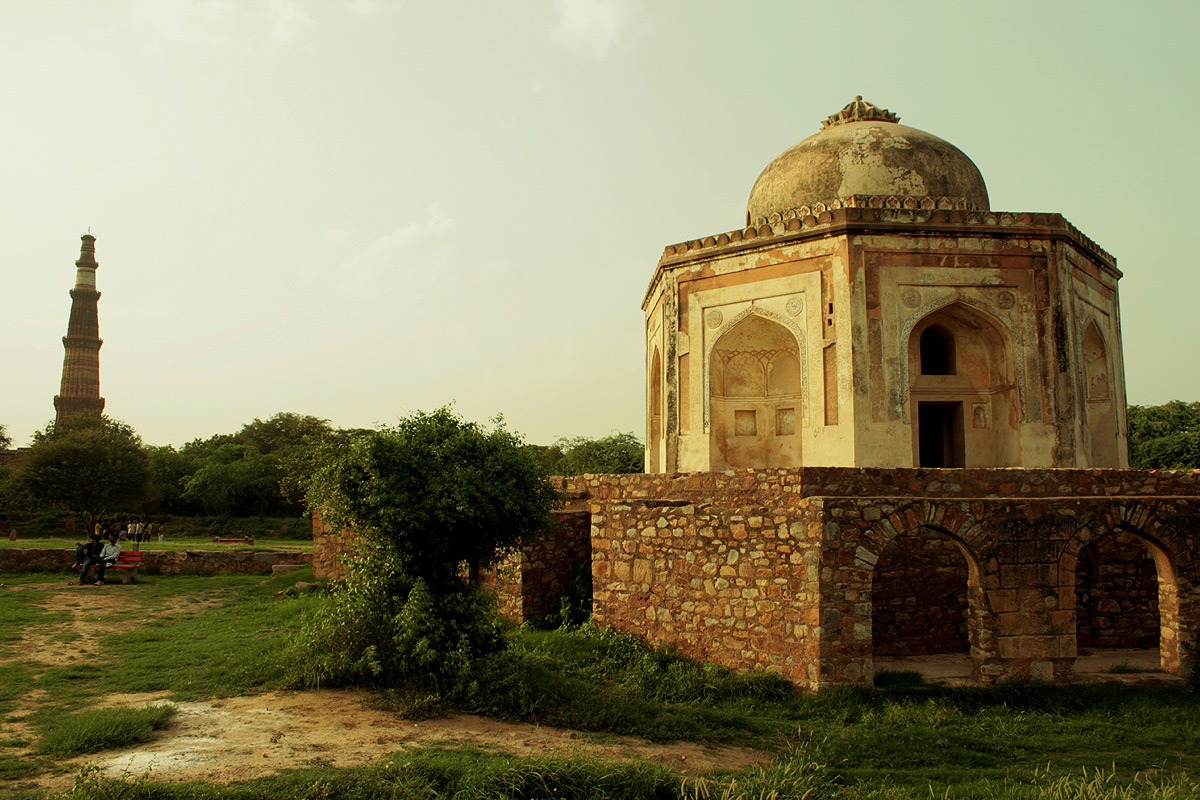
Tomb of Quli Khan, overlooking the Qutub Minar.

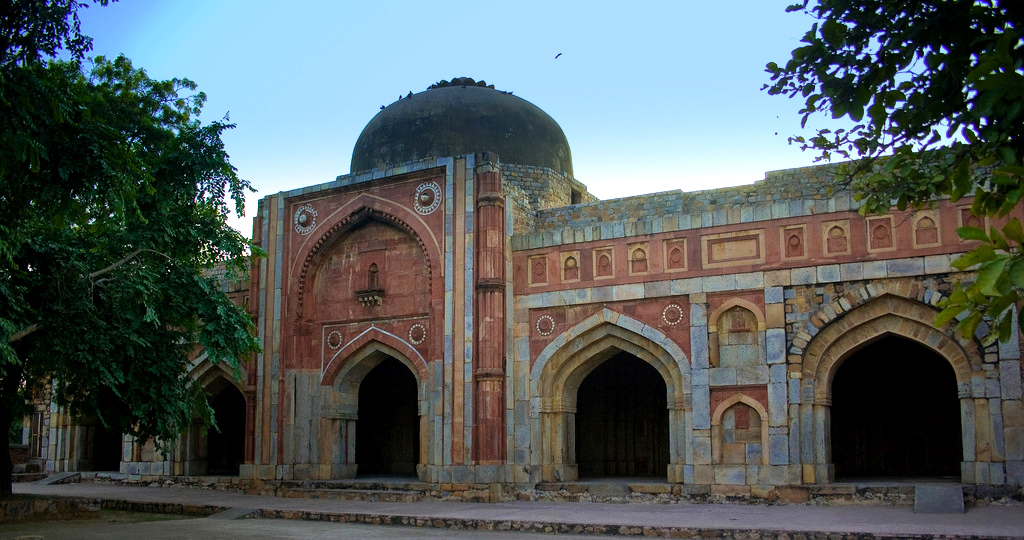
Jamali Kamali Mosque and Tomb complex built in 1528–1529 CE, in the Archaeological Park.

The Mehrauli Archaeological Park is an archaeological area spread over 81 hectares (200 acres) in the Mehrauli neighbourhood of the South Delhi district of Delhi, India. The park is located adjacent to the World Heritage-listed Qutb complex, which includes the Qutub Minar.

The park contains over 100 historically significant monuments. It is the only area in Delhi known for 1,000 years of continuous occupation. It includes the ruins of Lal Kot, built by the Tomar Rajputs in 1060 CE, making it the oldest extant fort of Delhi, and architectural relics of subsequent periods: the rule of the Khalji dynasty, the Tughlaq dynasty, the Lodhi dynasty of the Delhi Sultanate, the Mughal Empire, and the British Raj.

The park holds key milestones in the history of South Asian architecture. It is home to the tomb of Ghiyas ud-din Balban. This tomb features the earliest surviving true arch and true dome in the Indian Subcontinent. You can also find early pre-Mughal mosque architecture at the Jamali Kamali complex. The site includes elaborate underground stepwells like Gandhak ki Baoli and Rajon ki Baoli. Since 1997, three main organizations have managed and conserved the area. The three main organizations are Archaeological Survey of India (ASI), the Delhi Development Authority (DDA), and INTACH.

== Overview ==
The park contains significant sites including:

- Tomb of Balban, c. 1287 CE, wherein a true arch and the true dome were built for the first time in India
- Jamali Kamali Mosque and Tomb of Maulana Jamali Kamali (Jamali Kamboh), built 1526 - 1535 CE
- Quli Khan's Tomb
- Gandhak ki Baoli
- Rajon Ki Baoli, a stepwell, and
- Madhi Masjid.

Other nearby monuments include the Jahaz Mahal, Zafar Mahal of Bahadur Shah II alias Lal Mahal, Hauz-i-Shamsi and Tomb of Adham Khan. Pillars and remains of several monuments, Jharna which is like a pleasure garden of late Mughals are also lay scattered in the park.

== Redevelopment and conservation ==
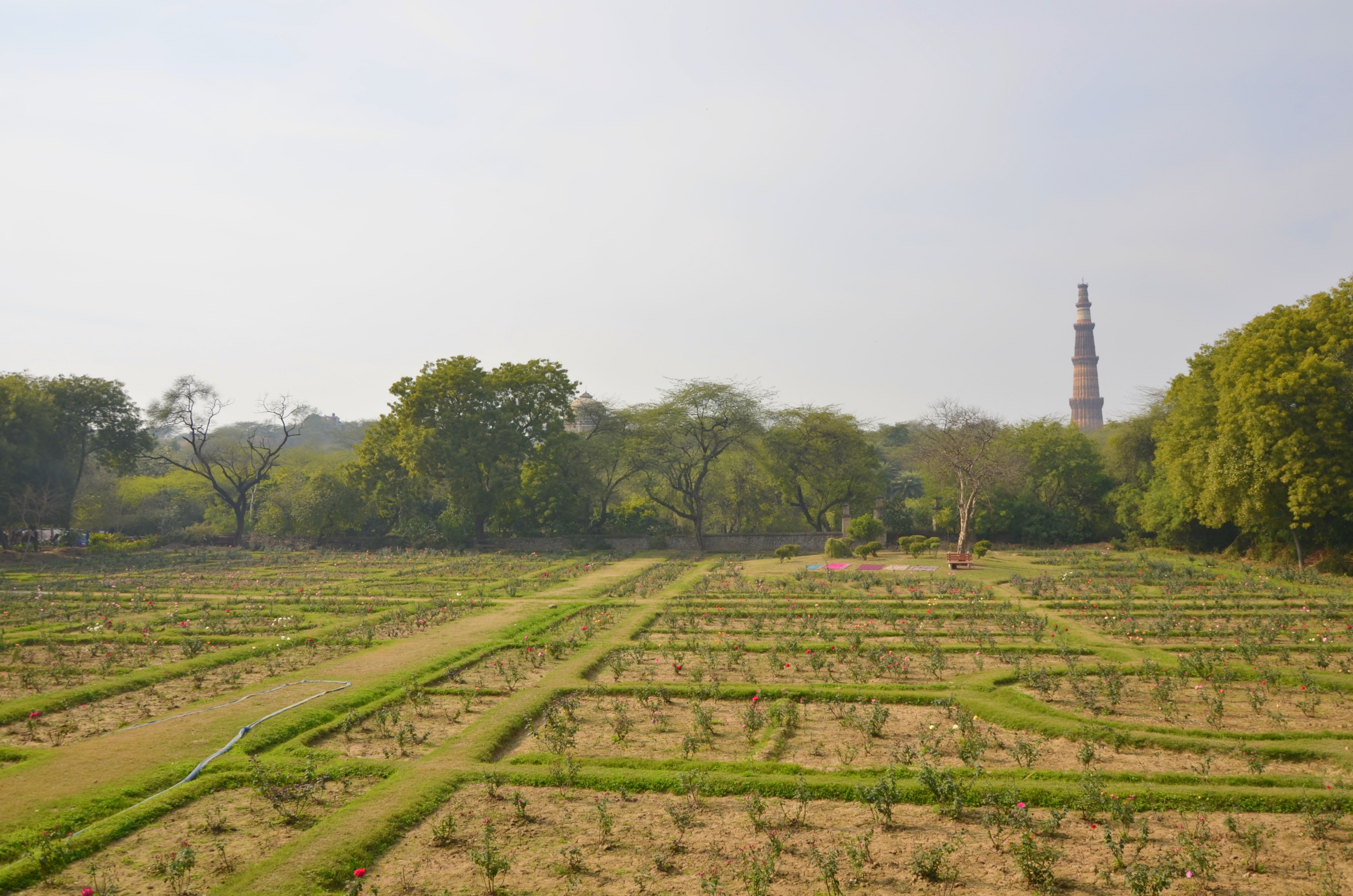
Rose Garden, Mehrauli Archaeological Park.

The redevelopment of the area as an archaeological park and conservation of important structures started in 1997, in collaboration between Delhi Tourism and Transportation Development Corporation (DTTDC), the State Department of Archaeology, the Delhi Development Authority (DDA) and the Indian National Trust for Art and Cultural Heritage (INTACH). INTACH first documented structures systematically and began conducting heritage walks in 2000.

Over the years, INTACH has restored some 40 monuments in the park and added signage, heritage trails, and sandstone trail-markers.

== Notable monuments and structures ==
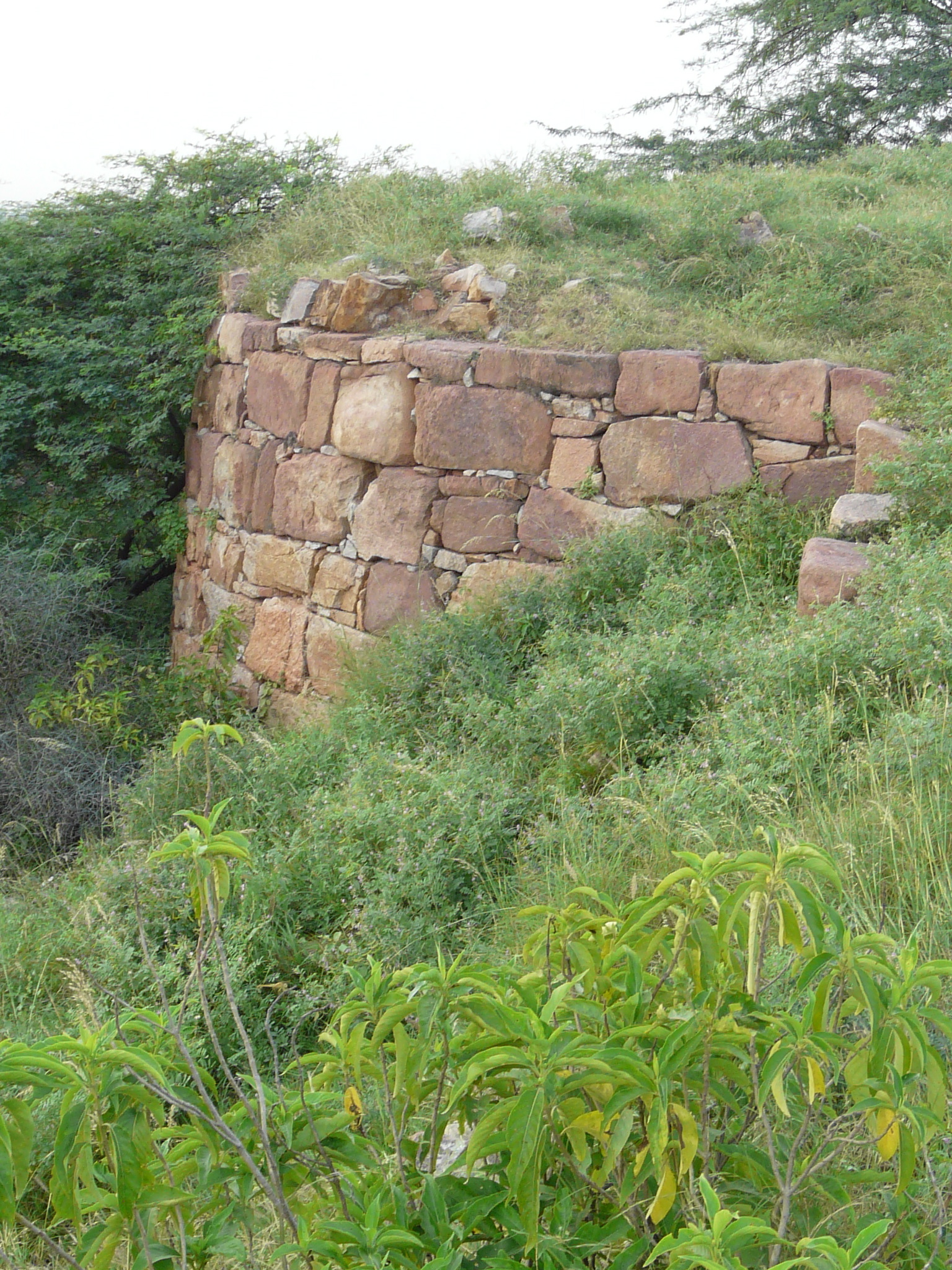
The bastion of Lal Kot fort, Mehrauli.

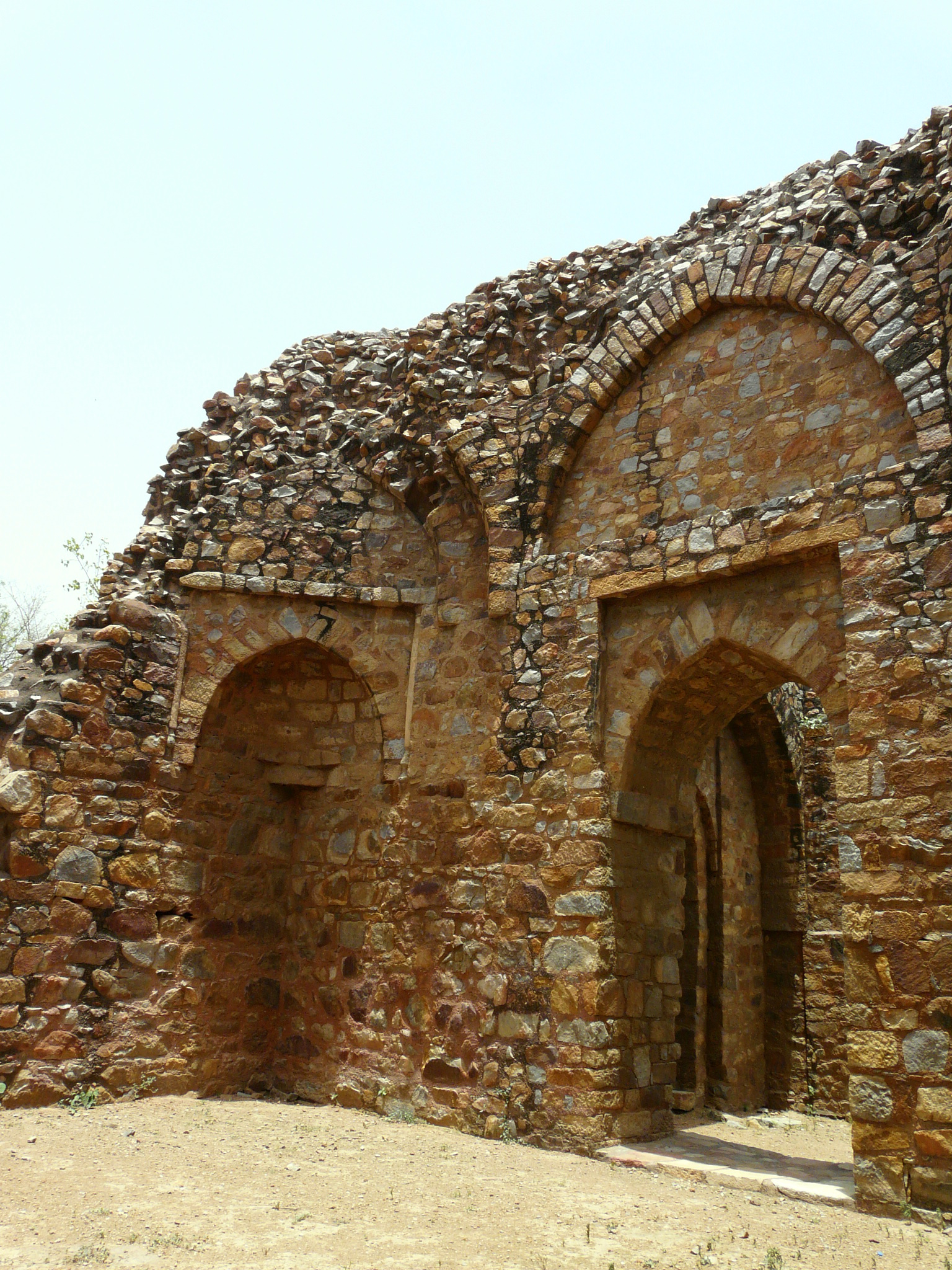
Balban's tomb, Mehrauli, ca 1287 CE

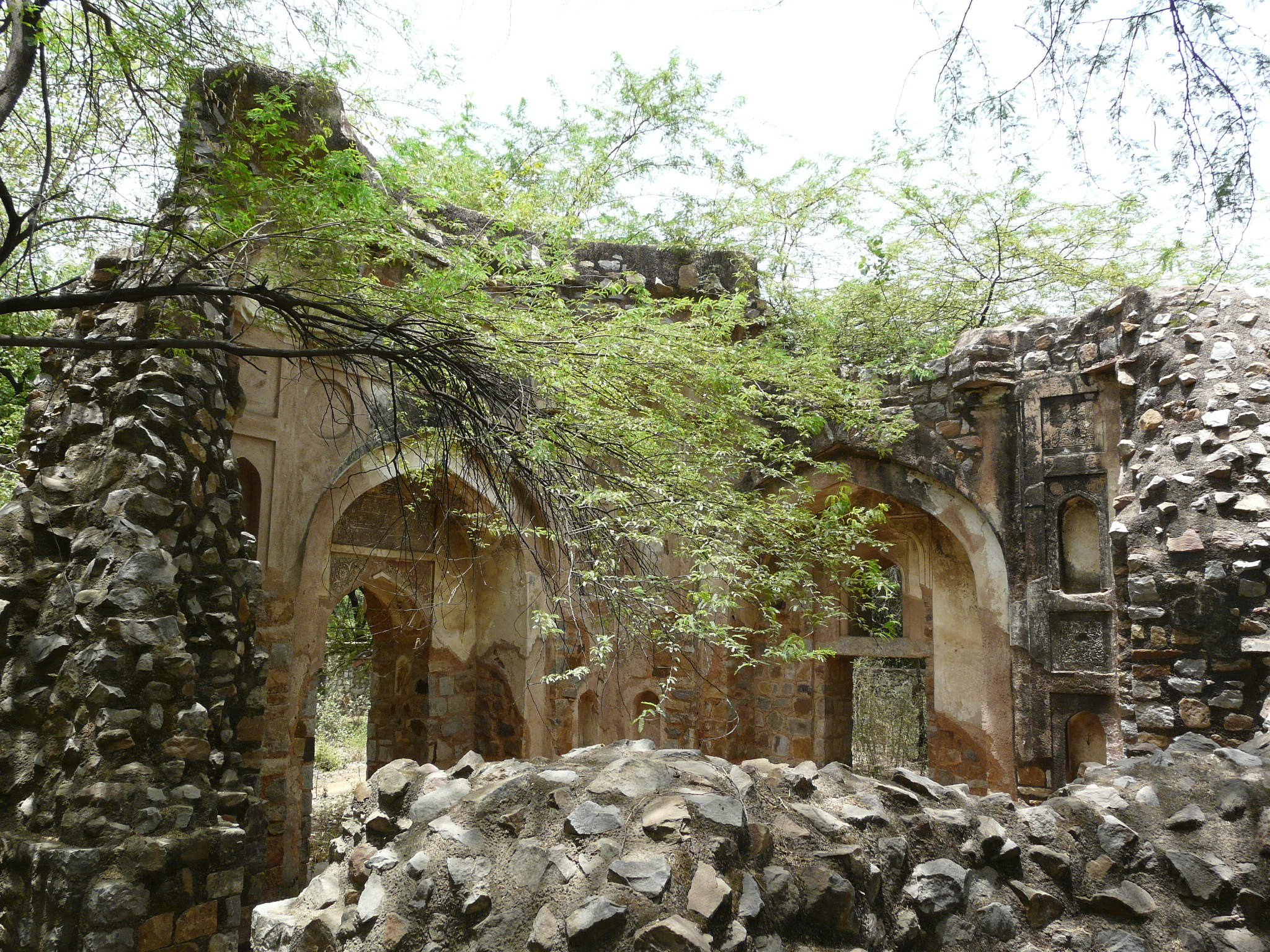
Tomb of Khan Shahid, Balban's son, Mehrauli.

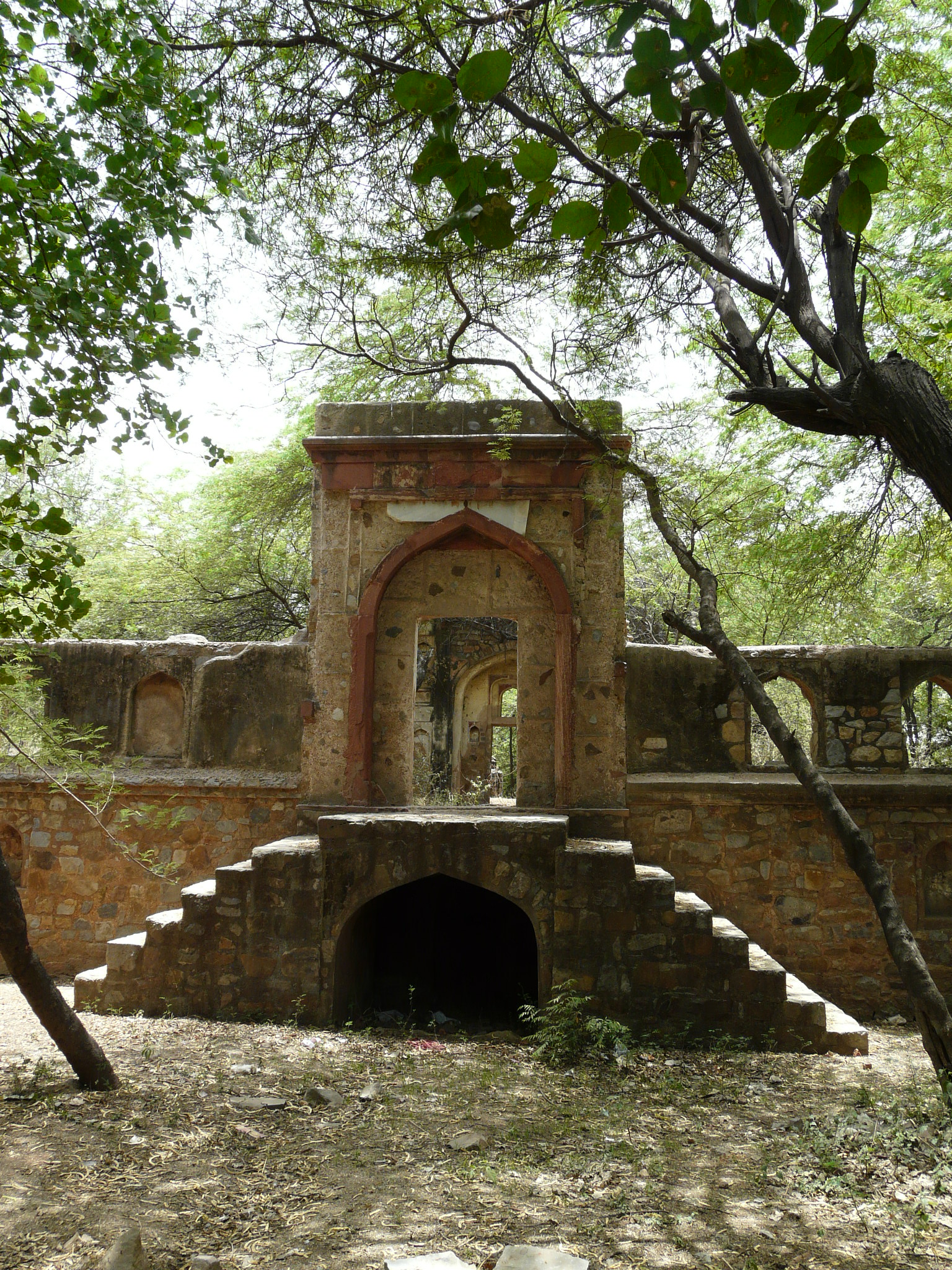
Entrance to Tomb of Khan Shahid, son of Balban

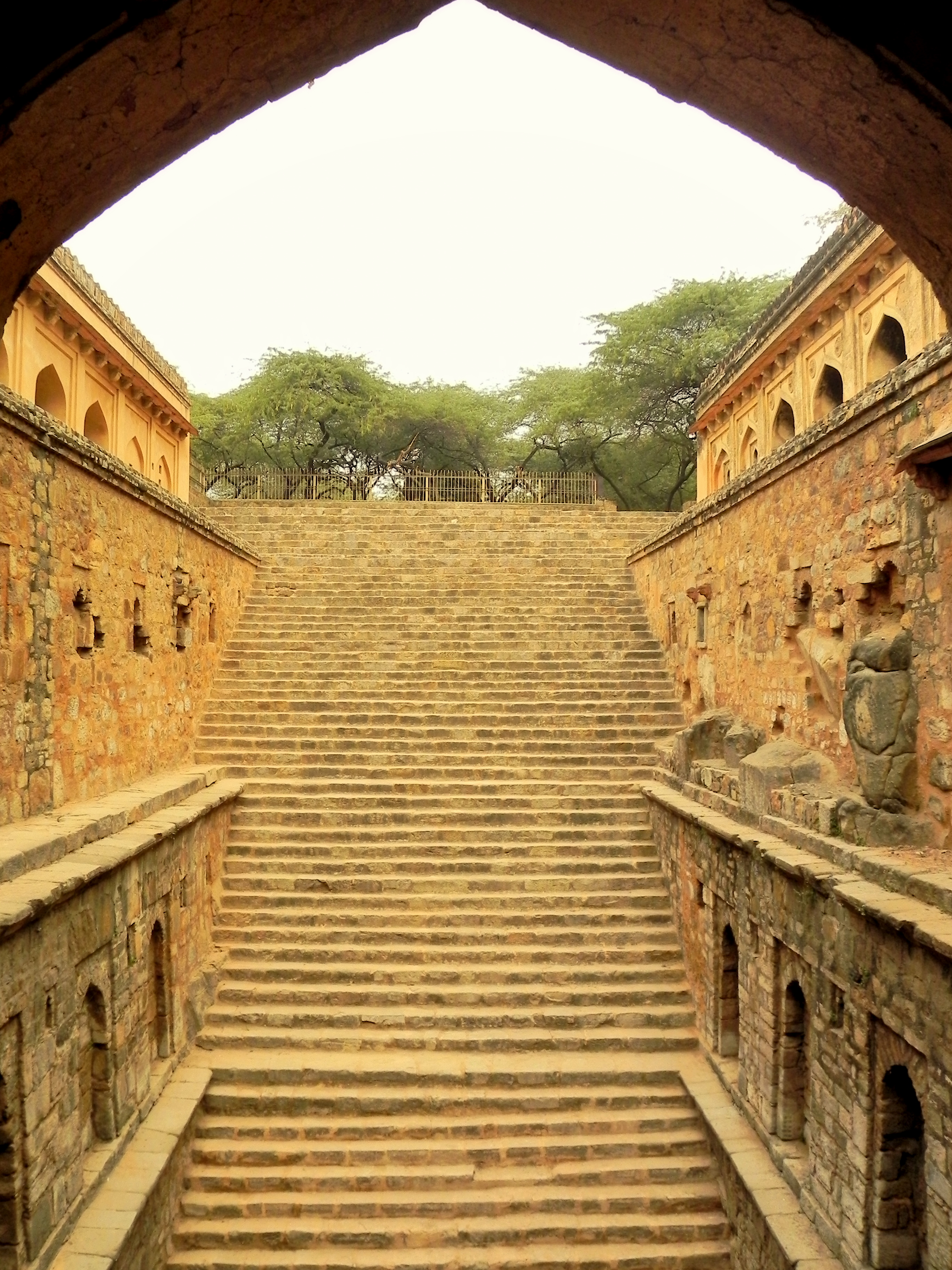
Steps of Rajon Ki Baoli

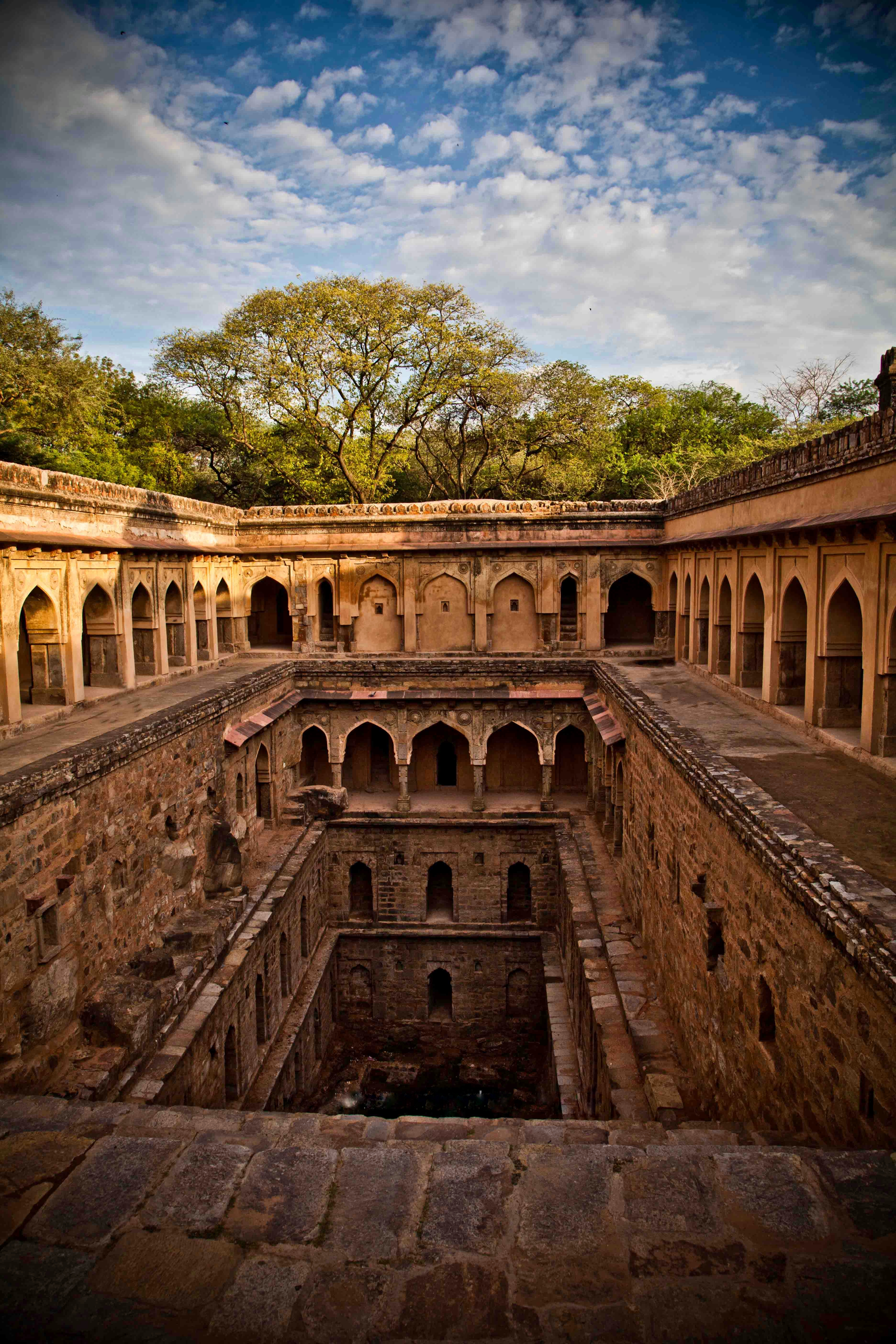
Rajon Ki Baoli

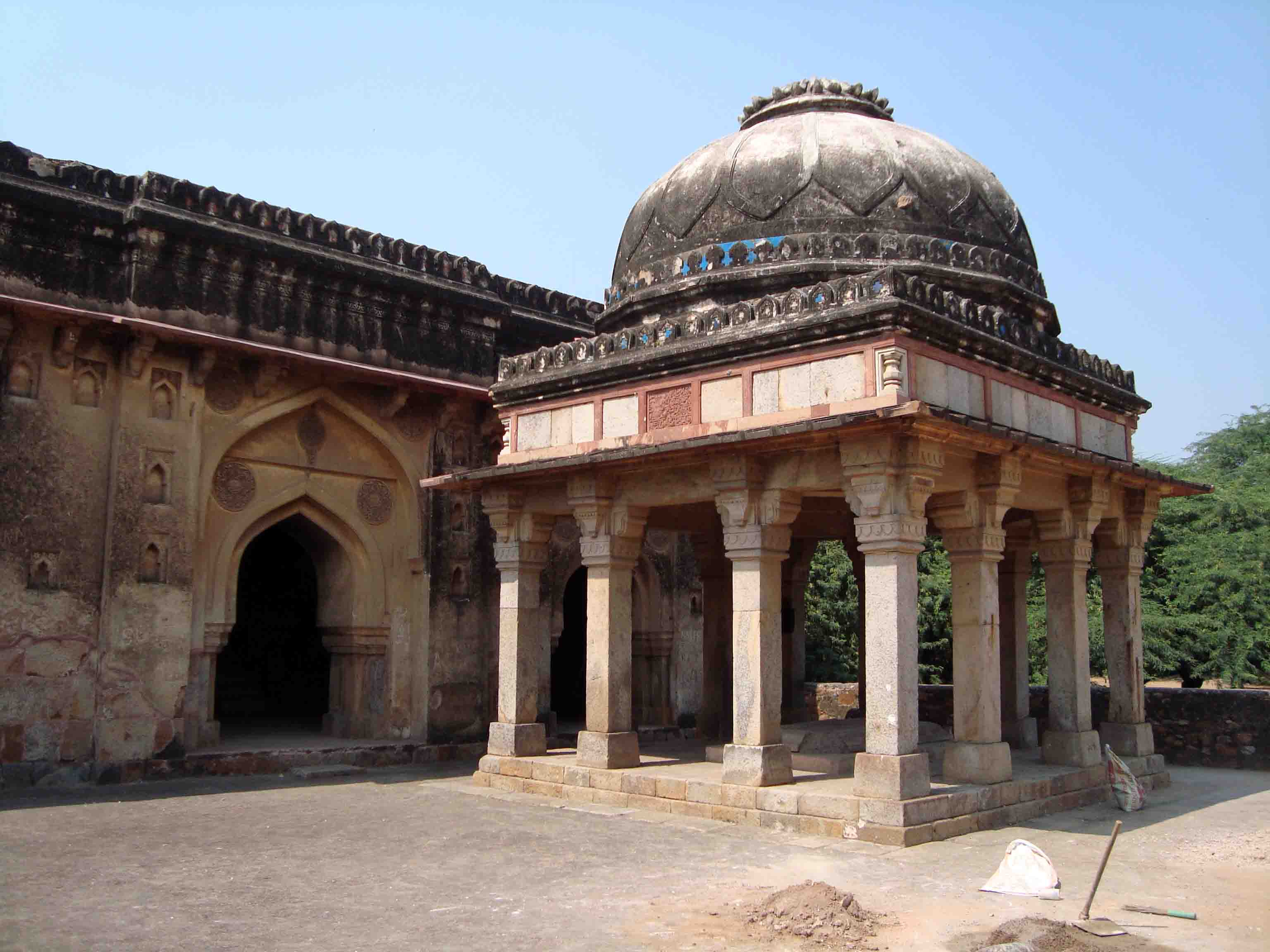
Walled mosque adjacent to the Baoli

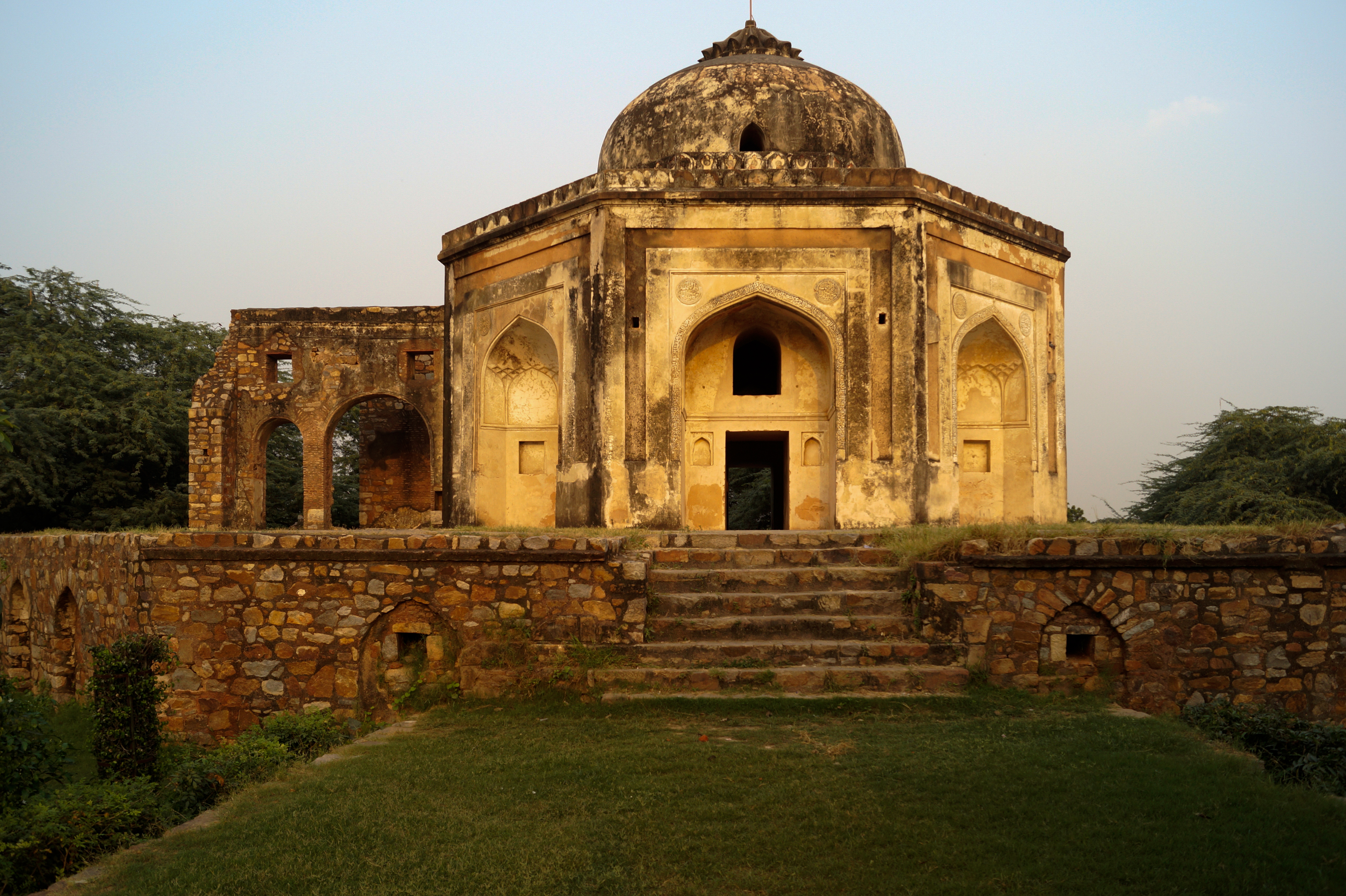
Quli Khan's Tomb is located near Boat House

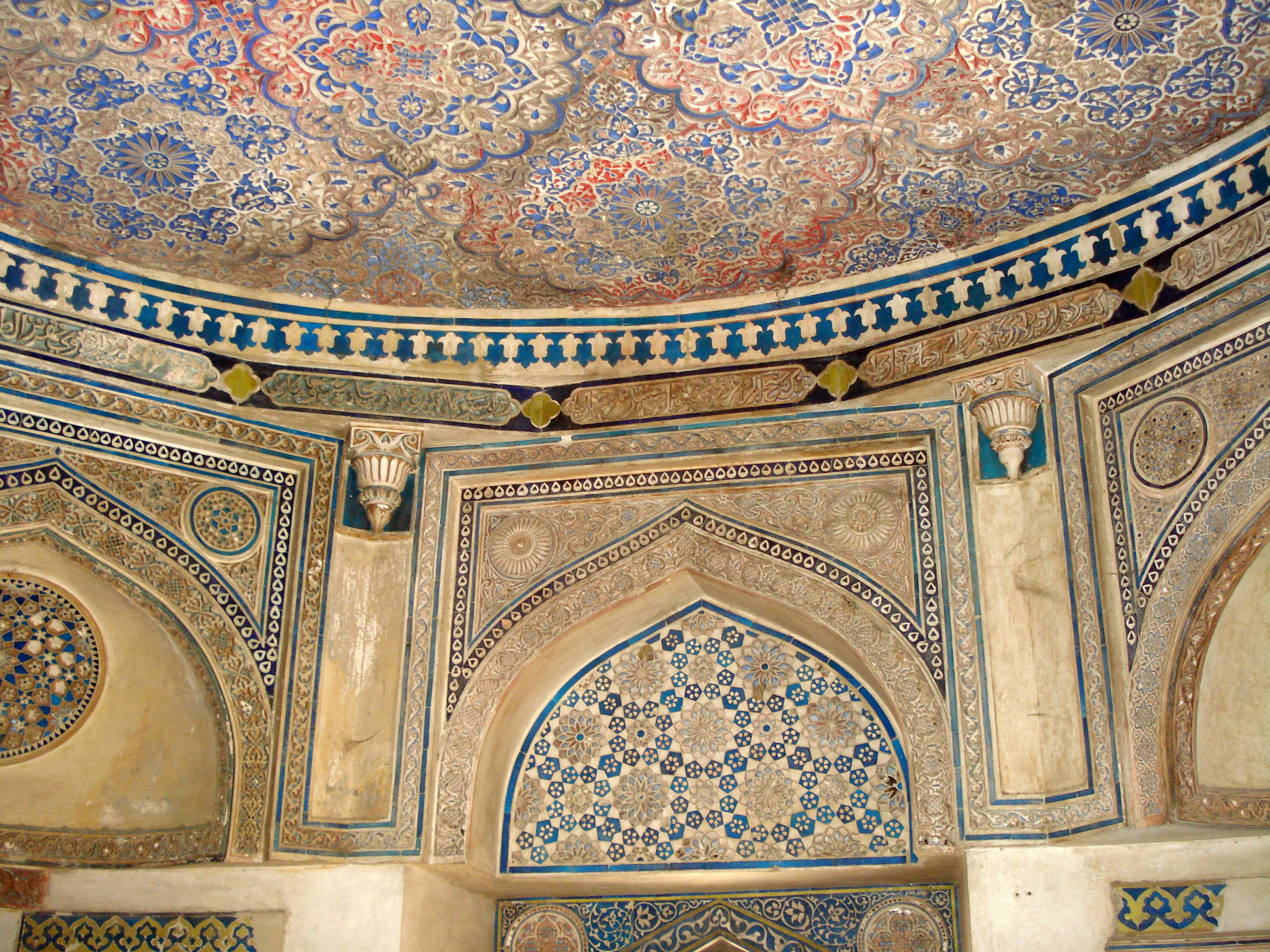
Inside Jamali Kamali Tomb, Mehrauli

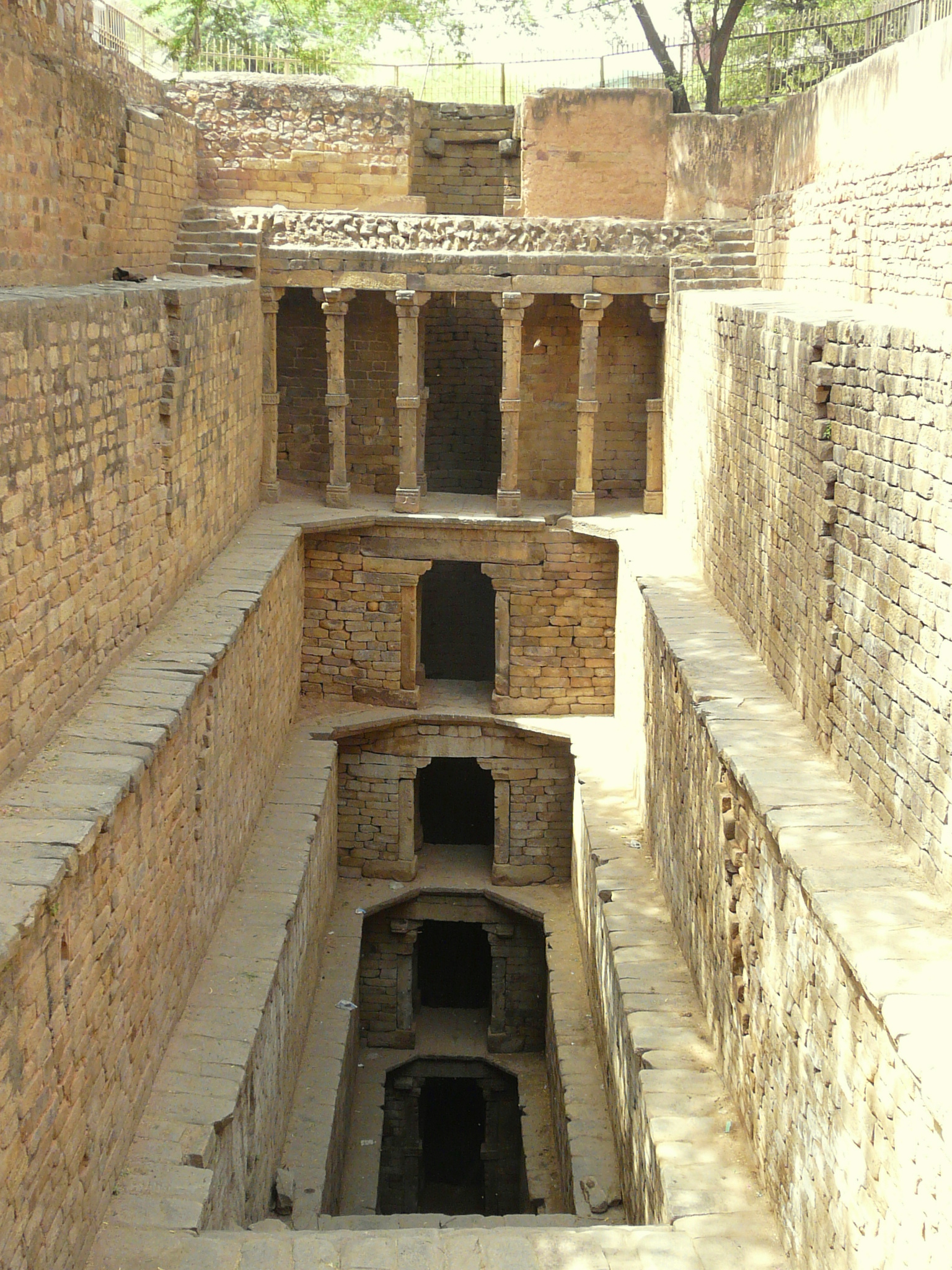
Gandhak ki Baoli, another stepwell beyond Rajon Ki Baoli.

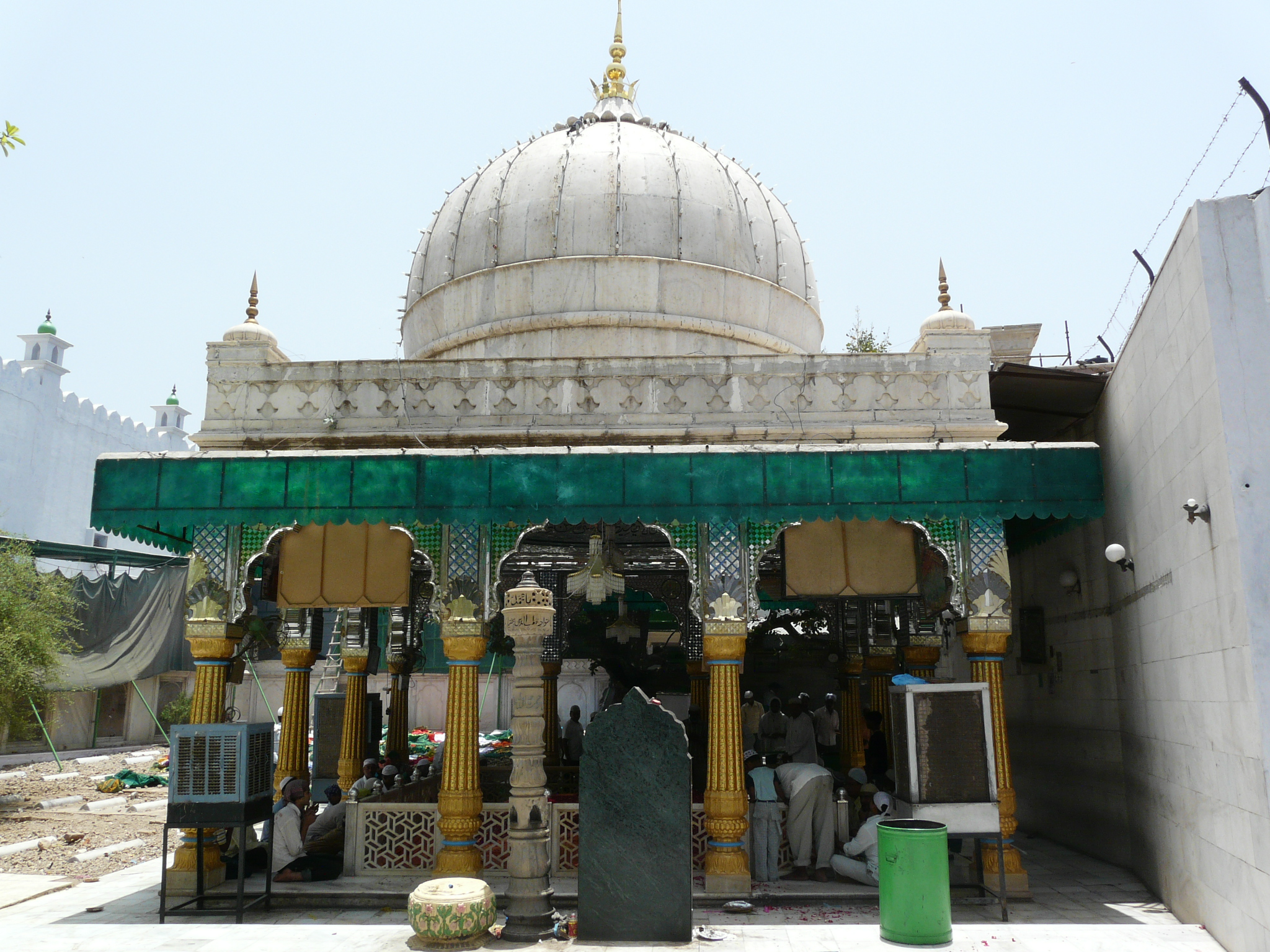
Dargah of Sufi saint, Qutbuddin Bakhtiar Kaki, beyond Rajon Ki Baoli.

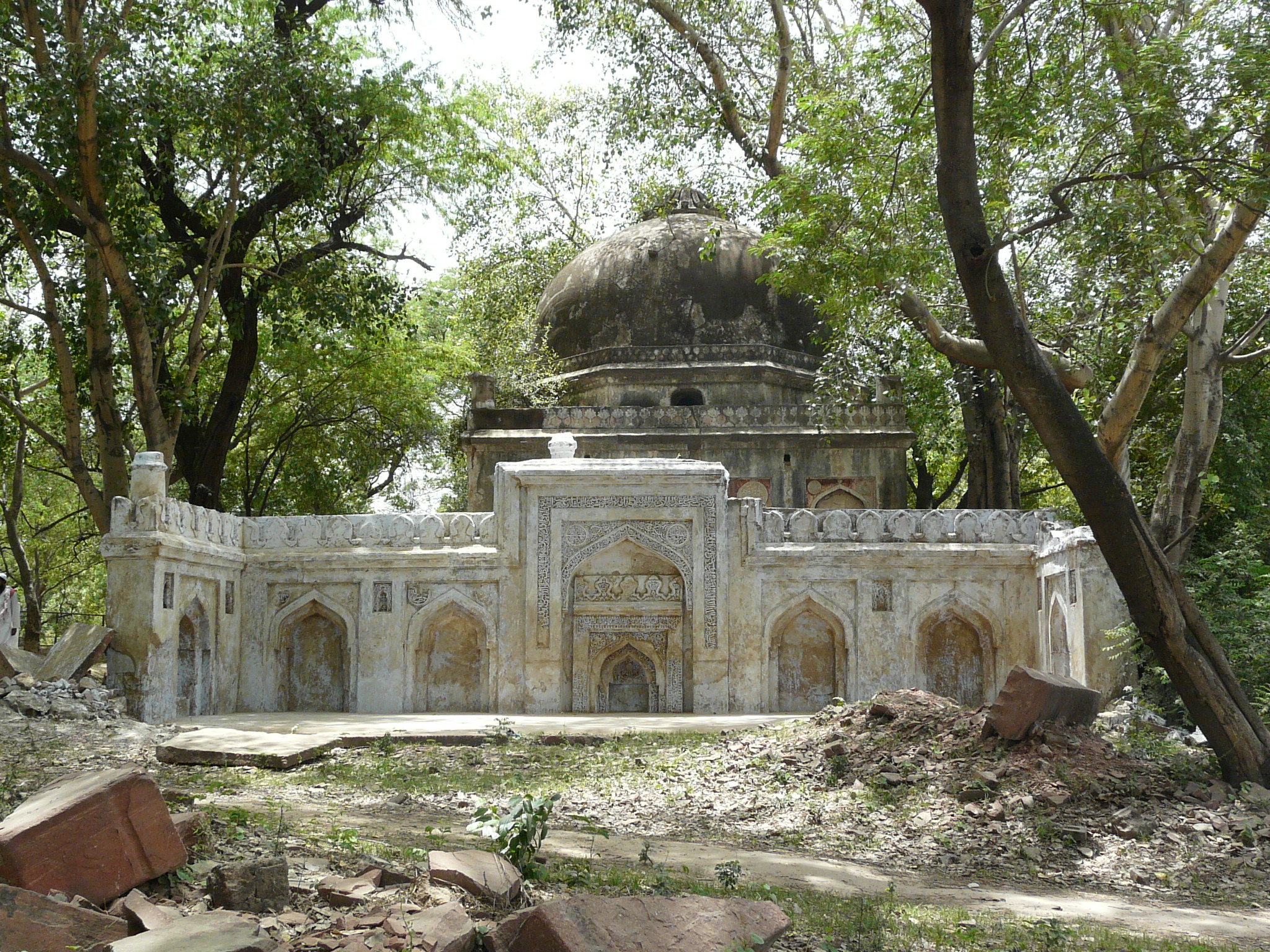
Tomb and wall mosque in Mehrauli Archaeological Park.

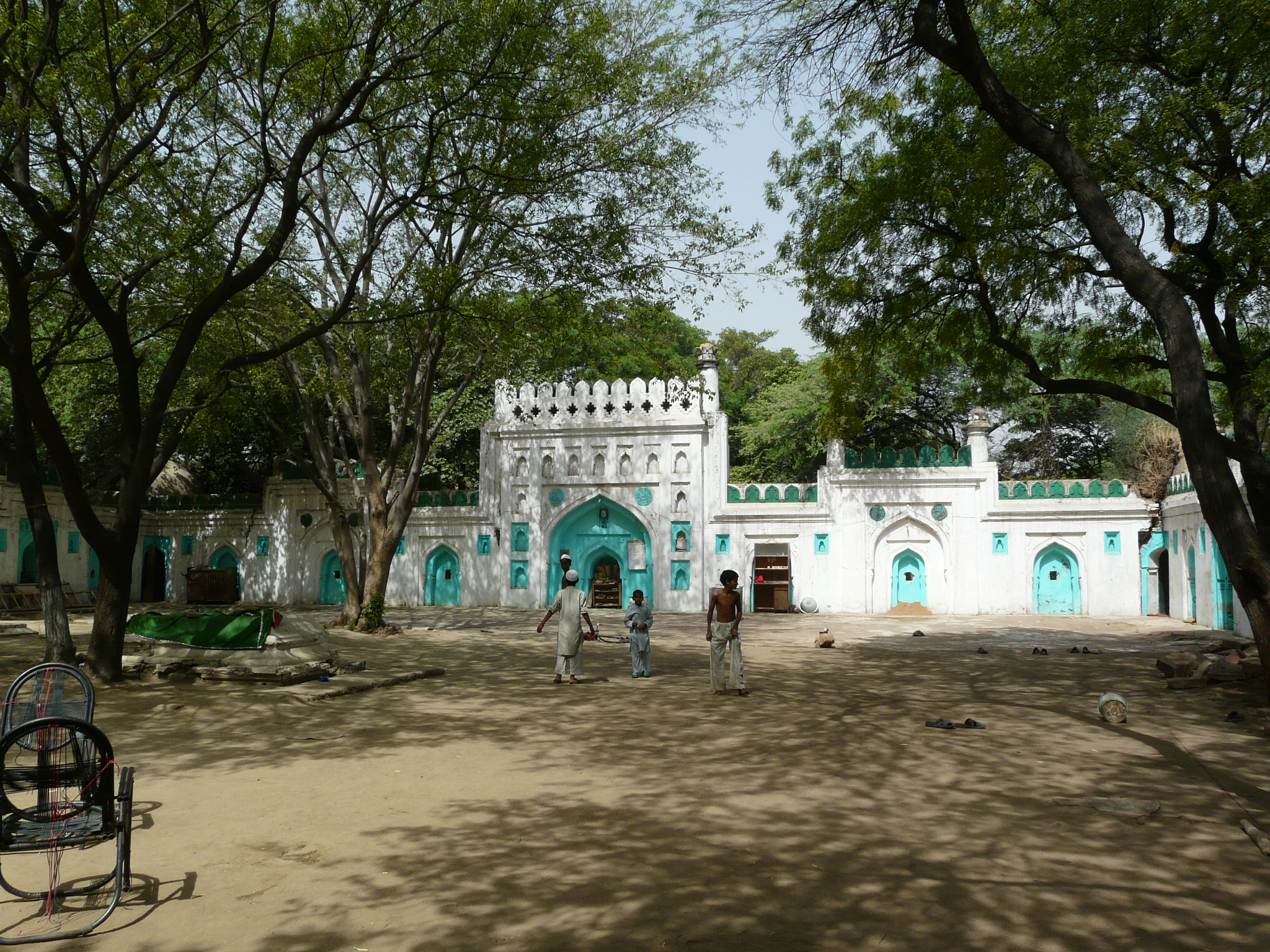
Bagichi Ki Masjid, Mehrauli.

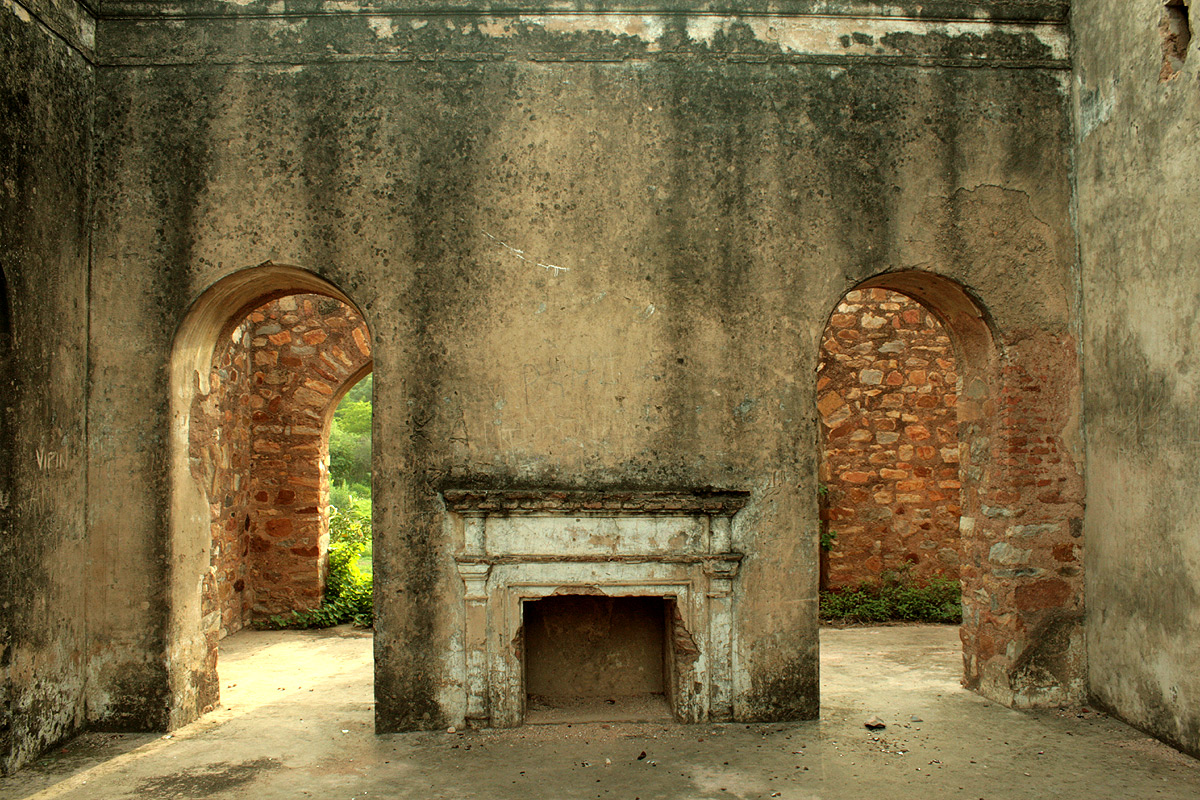
British Agent, Sir Thomas Metcalfe's Guest House at Dilkusha close to Quli Khan's tomb.

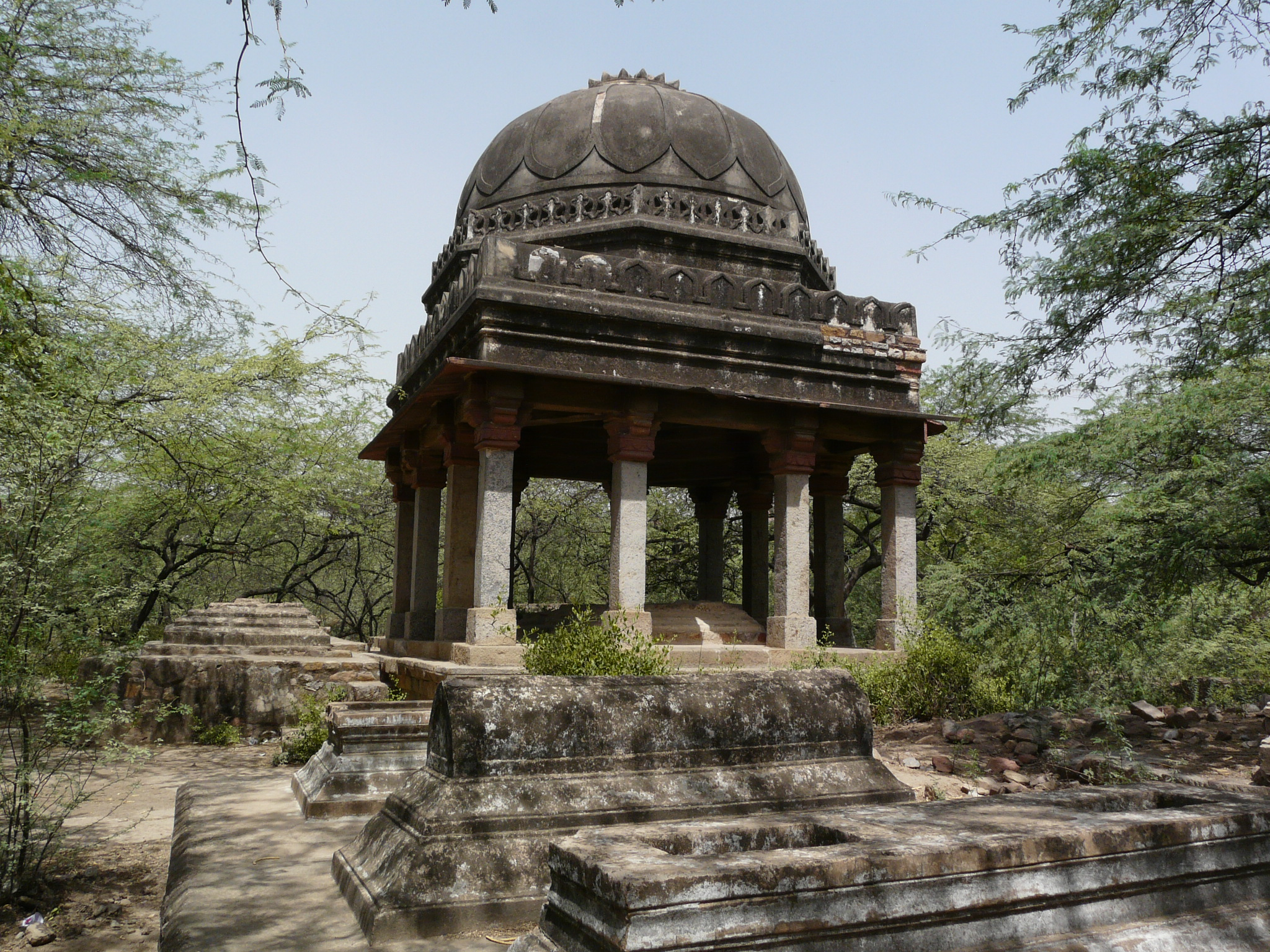
Pavilion tomb and grave platform, Mehrauli Archaeological Park.

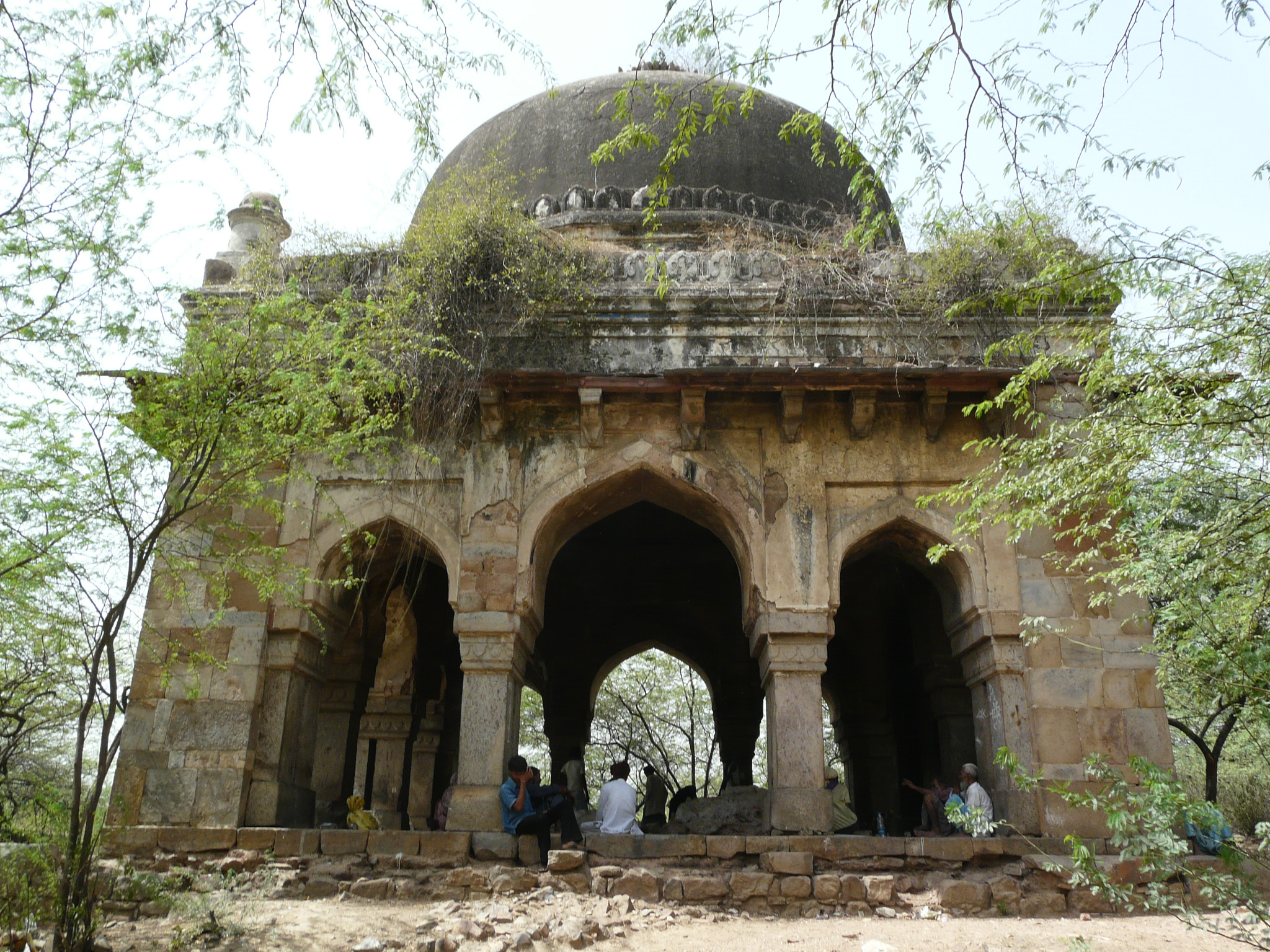
Tomb in Mehrauli Archaeological Park.

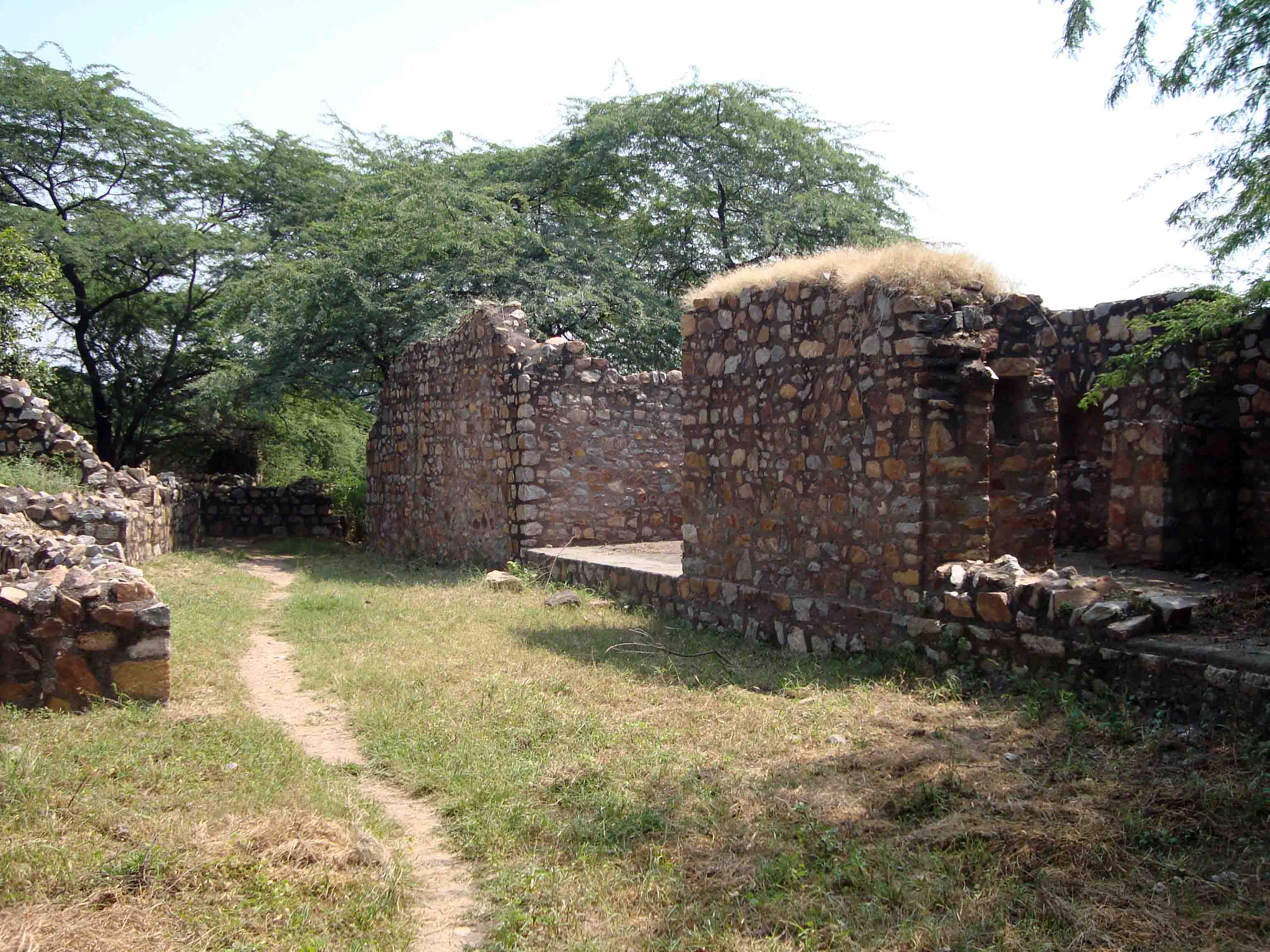
Ruined homes near Balban's tomb

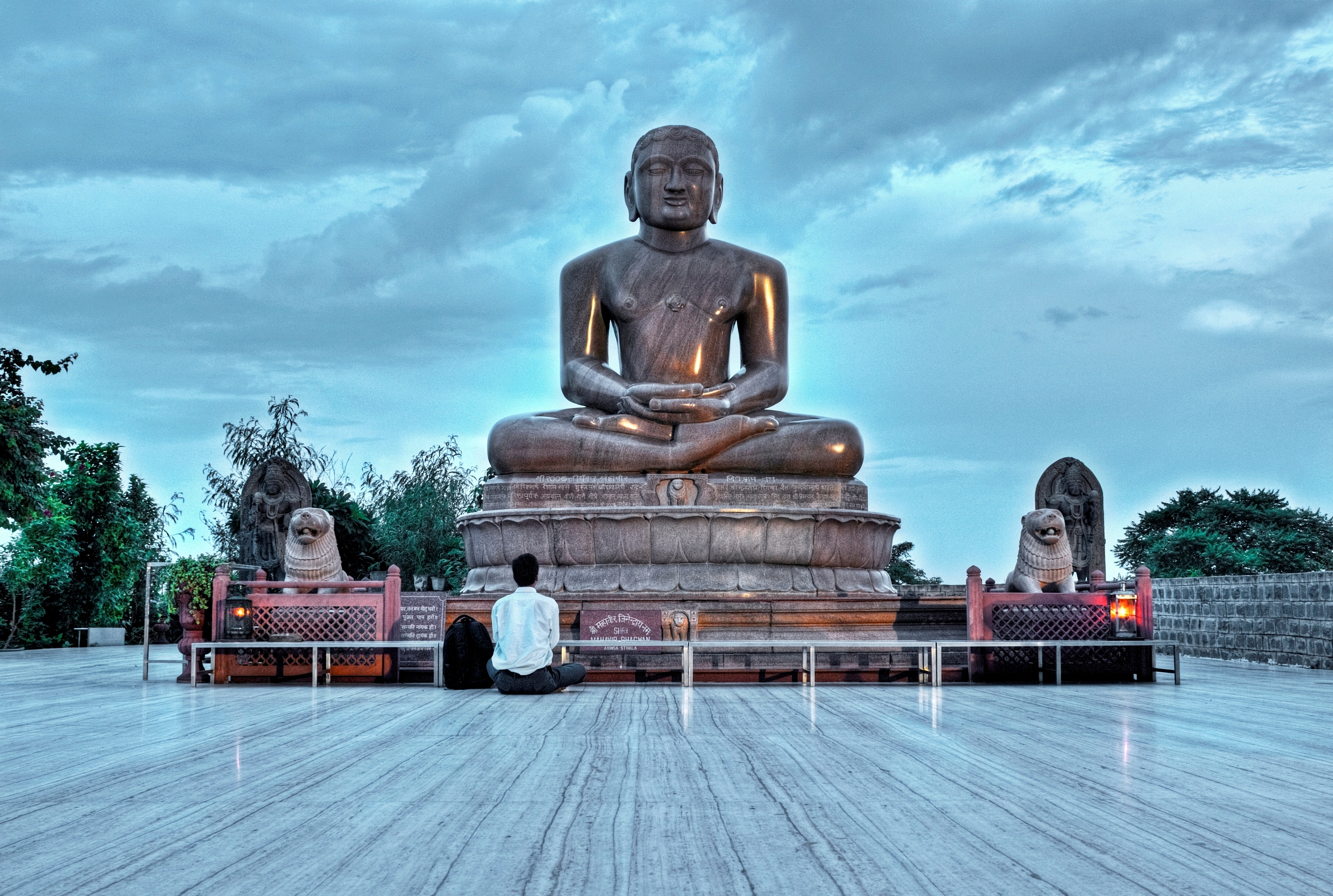
Ahinsa sthal is a place for Mahavir

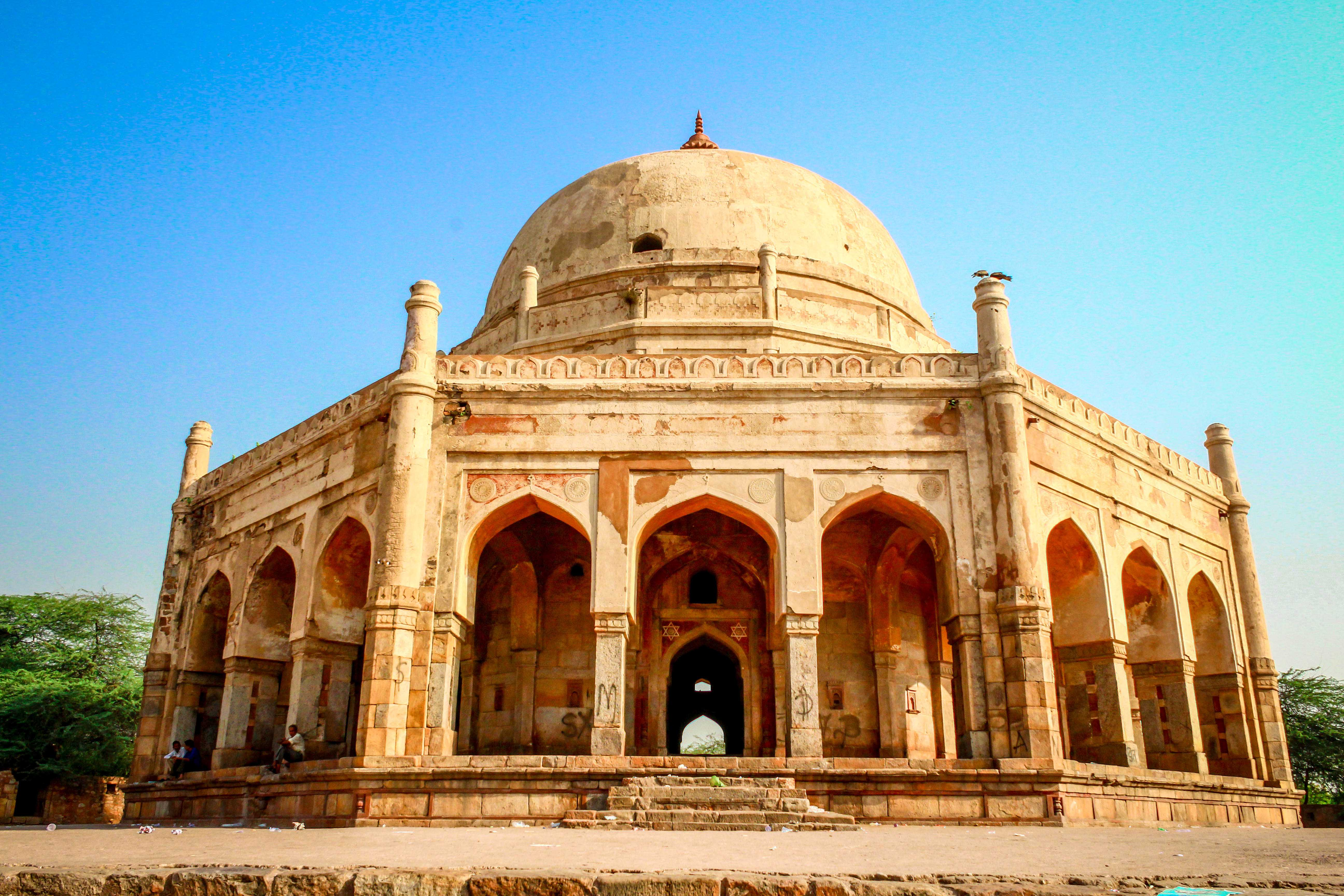
Adam Khan's Tomb

== See also ==
- Qutb complex
- History of Delhi
- Baolis of Mehrauli
- List of Monuments of National Importance in Delhi
