= Begampur (disambiguation) =

Begampur is a town in West Bengal, India.

Begampur or Begumpur may also refer to:

- Begampur railway station, West Bengal, India
- Begumpur, a village in Delhi, India; site of the ruins of Jahanpanah, capital of the Delhi Sultanate under Muhammad bin Tughluq
  - Begumpur Mosque, former mosque in Begumpur
- Begampur, Dindigul, a village in Tamil Nadu, India
  - Begumpur Mosque, Dindigul
- Begampur, Mainpuri, a village in Uttar Pradesh, India
- Begampur, Punjab, a village in Punjab, India
- Begampur, Rohini, a village in Delhi, India
- Begampur Khatola, a village in Haryana
- Begumpur Union, Khulna, Bangladesh

== See also ==
- Begum (disambiguation)
- Pur (disambiguation)
- Begampura, neighbourhood in Lahore, Pakistan
- Begampura (Ravidas), spiritual utopian concept developed by Saint Ravidas
  - Begampura Express, passenger train in India named after the concept, plying to and from Varanasi, the birthplace of Ravidas
