= Begum Para (disambiguation) =

Begum Para (1926–2008) was an Indian film actress in Hindi cinema.

Begum Para may also refer to:

- Begum Para, Toronto, a luxurious residential area for Bangladeshi immigrants in Canada

== See also ==
- Begum (disambiguation)
- Para (disambiguation)
