= Begum (disambiguation) =

Begum is a female royal and aristocratic title from Central and South Asia the feminine form of Beg.

Begum or Begüm may refer to:

== People ==
- Begum (name), a given name and last name
- Padshah Begum, an imperial title of the Mughal Empire

== Arts, entertainment, and media ==
- Begum (magazine), a Bengali-language news magazine in Bangladesh
- Alsana Begum, a character in the television serial White Teeth

== Places ==
- Begum Bazar, biggest commercial market in Hyderabad, India
- Begumpet, a neighborhood in Hyderabad, Andhra Pradesh, India
- Bahu Begum ka Maqbara, a royal tomb in Faizabad, India
- Begampur (disambiguation)

== See also ==
- Beg (disambiguation), male equivalent of the Turkic title
- Begamati zuban, an extinct sociolect of Urdu spoken by the noblewomen (begums) of India
- Begumabad Budhana, a town in Uttar Pradesh, India
- Begamganj, a town in Madhya Pradesh, India
