= Begampur, Dindigul =

Coordinates: 10.353954°N 77.965805°E

Begampur, is one of the zones of Dindigul Municipal Corporation located in Dindigul, Tamil Nadu.

== Origin of the name ==
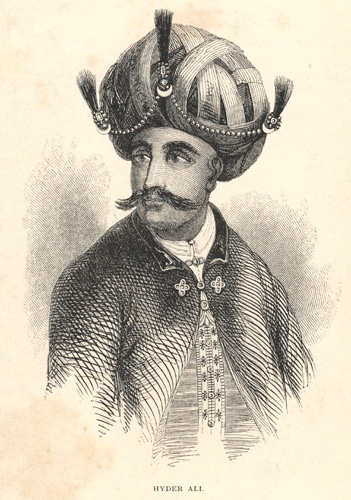
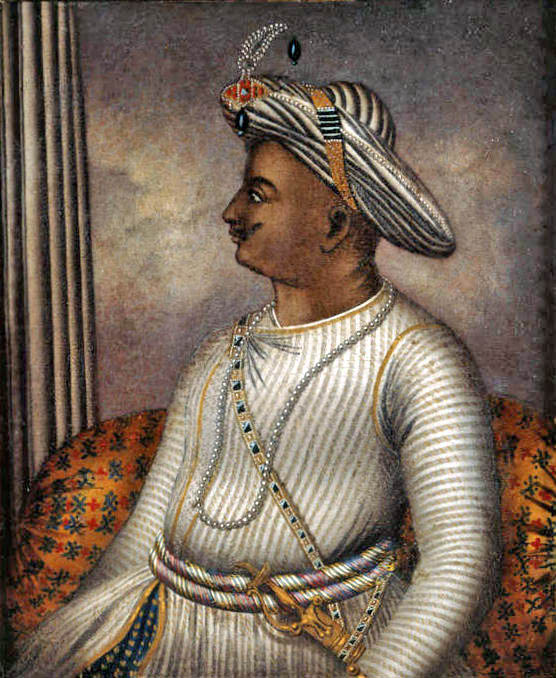
Images of Hyder Ali and his son Tipu Sultan

Hyder Ali (1721-1782 CE) was the Sultan of the Kingdom of Mysore in South India. He resided in Dindigul with his son, Tipu, for many years. In 1755, Hyder was appointed as the commandant of Dindigul with the task of increasing taxes, and he was successful in doing so. He also donated a portion of the funds to support the development of temples and mosques in the region. Tipu was later made the commandant of the Fort and ruled from there from 1784 to 1790. However, he was killed during the Mysore War when the British forces annexed the Fort. Hyder is credited with building three mosques in Dindigul: one for himself, one for his soldiers, and the third for the public, known as the Begampur Mosque. In 1766, Hyder's younger sister, Ameerunnisa Begam, died, and a tomb was built for her in the mosque. The area around the Begampur Mosque is named after Ameerunnisa Begam.

== Begumpur Mosque ==
Begumpur Mosque is located on Madurai Road, Begumpur in Dindigul. Constructed in the Mughal architectural style, the mosque was built by Haidar Ali. The mosque is named after Ameerunnisa Begum, the younger sister of Hyder, who is buried in the mosque during 1766.

The mosque is the largest and one of the oldest in Dindigul and is active as a place of worship.

== Neighbourhoods ==
Its neighborhoods are Nagal Nagar, Mettupatti, Saveriyar palayam, Muhamadiya Puram, parai patti.

== Education ==
It has Hajarath Ameerunisha Begam Higher secondary School, Green Park Matriculation School, Lourdes Higher Secondary School, St Xavier Middle School, Annai Indhira English Medium School.

== Transport ==
Nearest Railway Station Dindigul Junction railway station.

== See also ==
- Begumpur Mosque, Dindigul
- Dindigul Fort
- Dindigul
