= Begumpur Mosque, Dindigul =

Mosque in Begampur, Dindigul, Tamil Nadu, India

Begumpur Mosque
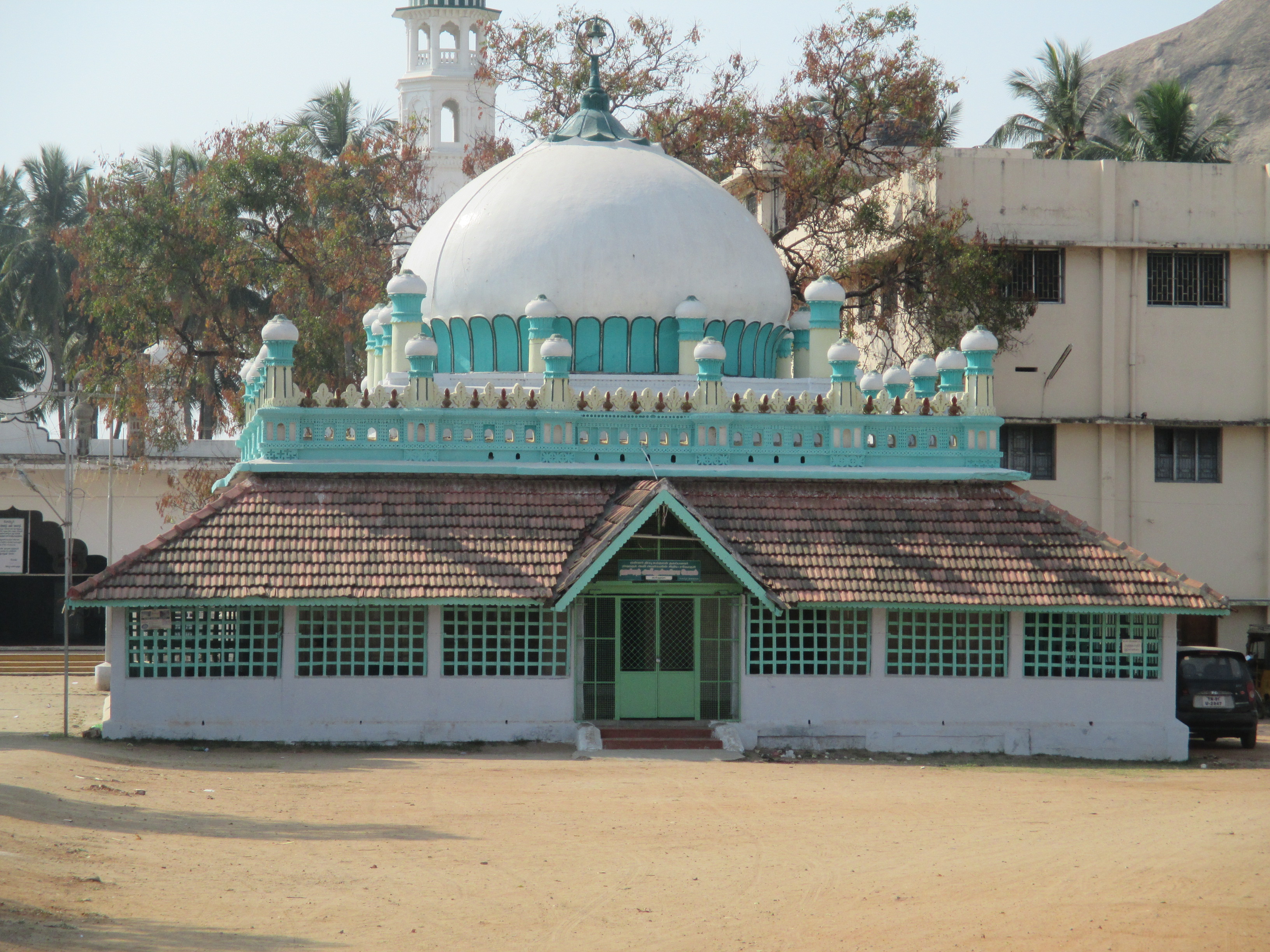
- The mosque with dome, wuzu, and minarets

- Location of the mosque in Tamil Nadu

Religion
- Affiliation: Islam
- Ecclesiastical or organisational status: Mosque
- Status: Active

Location
- Location: Begumpur, Dindigul, Tamil Nadu
- Country: India
- Coordinates: 10°21′24″N 77°57′56″E

Architecture
- Type: Mosque architecture
- Style: Mughal
- Founder: Haidar Ali
- Completed: 1776; 250 years ago

Specifications
- Dome: One
- Minaret: Two

The Begumpur Mosque, also called the Begumpur Big Mosque, is a mosque located on Madurai Road, Begampur in Dindigul, the administrative headquarters of the Dindigul district in state of Tamil Nadu, India. Constructed in the Mughal style, the mosque was built by Haidar Ali. The mosque is named after Ameerunnisa Begum, the younger sister of Hyder, who is buried in the mosque during 1766.

The mosque is the largest and one of the oldest in Dindigul and is active as a place of worship.

== History ==
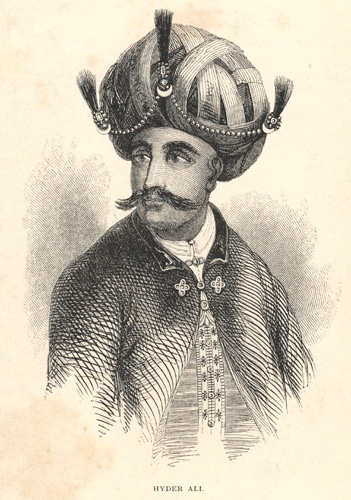
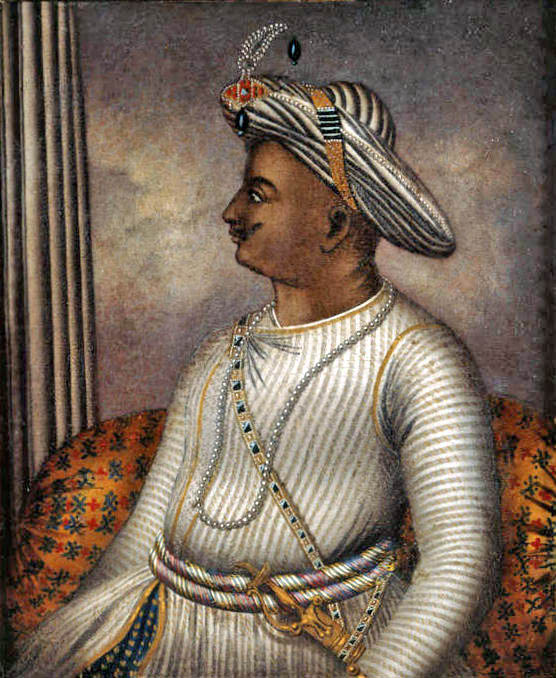
Images of Hyder Ali and his son Tipu Sultan

Hyder Ali (1721 -82 CE) was the Sultan Kingdom of Mysore in South India. He and wife Fakhr-un-Nisa were childless for some years and prayed at the tomb of Tipu Mastan Aulia. They also visited a Sufi saint, who assured them that they would be blessed with a child soon. Tipu was the first son of Hyder, who helped him win many of the battles. Dindigul is the place where Hyder and Tipu resided for many years. Hyder was appointed the commandent at Dindigul in 1755 to increase the taxes and he was effective in the same. He donated a part of the funds for the development of temples and mosques in the region. Hyder's son Tipu was made the commandent of the Fort and he ruled from there from 1784 to 1790. Tipu was killed in the Mysore War of 1790, when the British forces annexed the Fort. Hyder is believed to have constructed three mosques in Dindigul - one for himself, second for his soldiers and third for the public, which is the Begampur Mosque. During 1766, Ameerunnisa Begum, the younger sister of Hyder was dead and a tomb was built in the mosque for her.

== Architecture ==
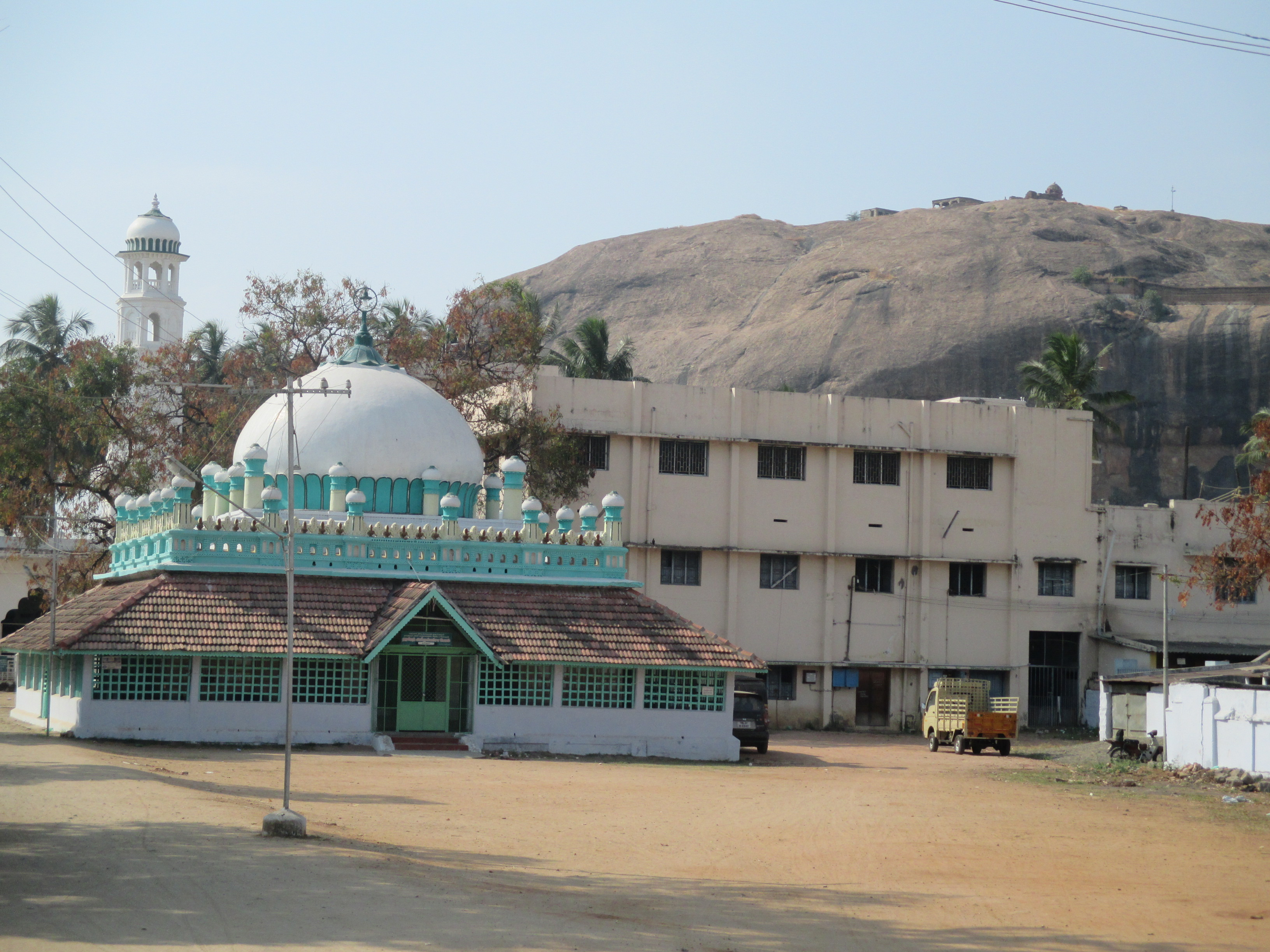
The mosque with the Rockfort in the background

The mosque is named after Ameerunnisa Begum, the younger sister of Hyder, who is buried in the mosque. The place is called Begampur on account of the same. The mosque has an open terrace with an arch at the front. The tomb of Ameerunnisa is found in the first building, which has tiled roof in the fronts and a dome over the sanctum. The mosque is located behind the mausoleum. It has two minarets and a large prayer hall. The subsidiary shrines are found around the sanctum. A madrasa is located on the eastern side, close to the entrance.

The Big Mosque is the largest and considered the principal mosque in the city of Dindigul. The mosque is an active place of worship. There is a constant flow of visitors in the mosque as it is located in one of the busiest places in Dindigul. During the sacred festivals of Bakrid and Ramzan, the devotees overflow, some of them offering prayers from the surrounding grounds.

It has the head Markaz of Tablighi jamaat in Tamil Nadu. Every year conference of ulamas are arranged and many imams all over India attend.

== See also ==
- Islam in India
- List of mosques in India
