= Begumabad Budhana =

- Census town
- Location in Uttar Pradesh, India Begumabad Budhana (India)
- Coordinates: 28°50′45″N 77°34′22″E
- Country: India
- State: Uttar Pradesh
- District: Ghaziabad

Population (2001)
  - Total: 16,248

Languages
  - Official: Hindi
- Time zone: UTC+5:30 (IST)
- Vehicle registration: UP
- Website: up.gov.in

Begumabad Budhana is a census town in Ghaziabad district in the state of Uttar Pradesh, India.

== Demographics ==
As of 2001 India census, Begumabad Budhana had a population of 16,248. Males constitute 54% of the population and females 46%. Begumabad Budhana has an average literacy rate of 62%, higher than the national average of 59.5%; with 62% of the males and 38% of females literate. 15% of the population is under 6 years of age.
