= Begampur, Punjab =

Begampur
- Village
- Location in Punjab, India Begampur (India)
- Coordinates: 31.2725377°N 75.8206549°E
- Country: India
- State: Punjab
- District: Kapurthala
- Tehsil: Phagwara

Government
  - Type: Panchayat raj
  - Body: Gram panchayat
- Elevation: 246 m (807 ft)

Population (2011)
  - Total: 849
- Sex ratio 446/403 ♂/♀

Languages
  - Official: Punjabi
- Time zone: UTC+5:30 (IST)
- PIN: 144037
- Telephone code: 01826
- ISO 3166 code: IN-PB
- Vehicle registration: PB 37
- Website: jalandhar.nic.in

Begampur is a village in Phillaur tehsil in Jalandhar district of Punjab State, India. It is located 9.7 km away from Phagwara, 35 km from Phillaur, 30 km from district headquarter Jalandhar and 126 km from state capital Chandigarh. The village is administrated by a sarpanch who is an elected representative of village as per Panchayati raj (India).

== Demography ==
As of 2011, Begampur has a total number of 192 houses and population of 849 of which 443 are males while 403 are females according to the report published by Census India in 2011. Literacy rate of Begampur is 76.35%, higher than state average of 75.84%. The population of children under the age of 6 years is 71 which is 8.36% of total population of Begampur, and child sex ratio is approximately 972 as compared to Punjab state average of 846.

Most of the people are from Schedule Caste which constitutes 70.79% of total population in Begampur. The town does not have any Schedule Tribe population so far.

Per census 2011, 265 people were engaged in work activities out of the total population of Begampur which includes 245 males and 20 females. According to census survey report 2011, 84.53% workers describe their work as main work and 15.47% workers are involved in marginal activity providing livelihood for less than 6 months.

== Transport ==
=== Rail ===
Phagwara Junction train station is the nearest train station however, Bannga railway station is 23 km away from the village.

=== Air ===
The nearest domestic airport is located 63.6 km away in Ludhiana and the nearest international airport is located in Chandigarh also Sri Guru Ram Dass Jee International Airport is the second nearest airport which is 124 km away in Amritsar.
