= Begumpur Mosque =

Former mosque, now monument, in Delhi, India

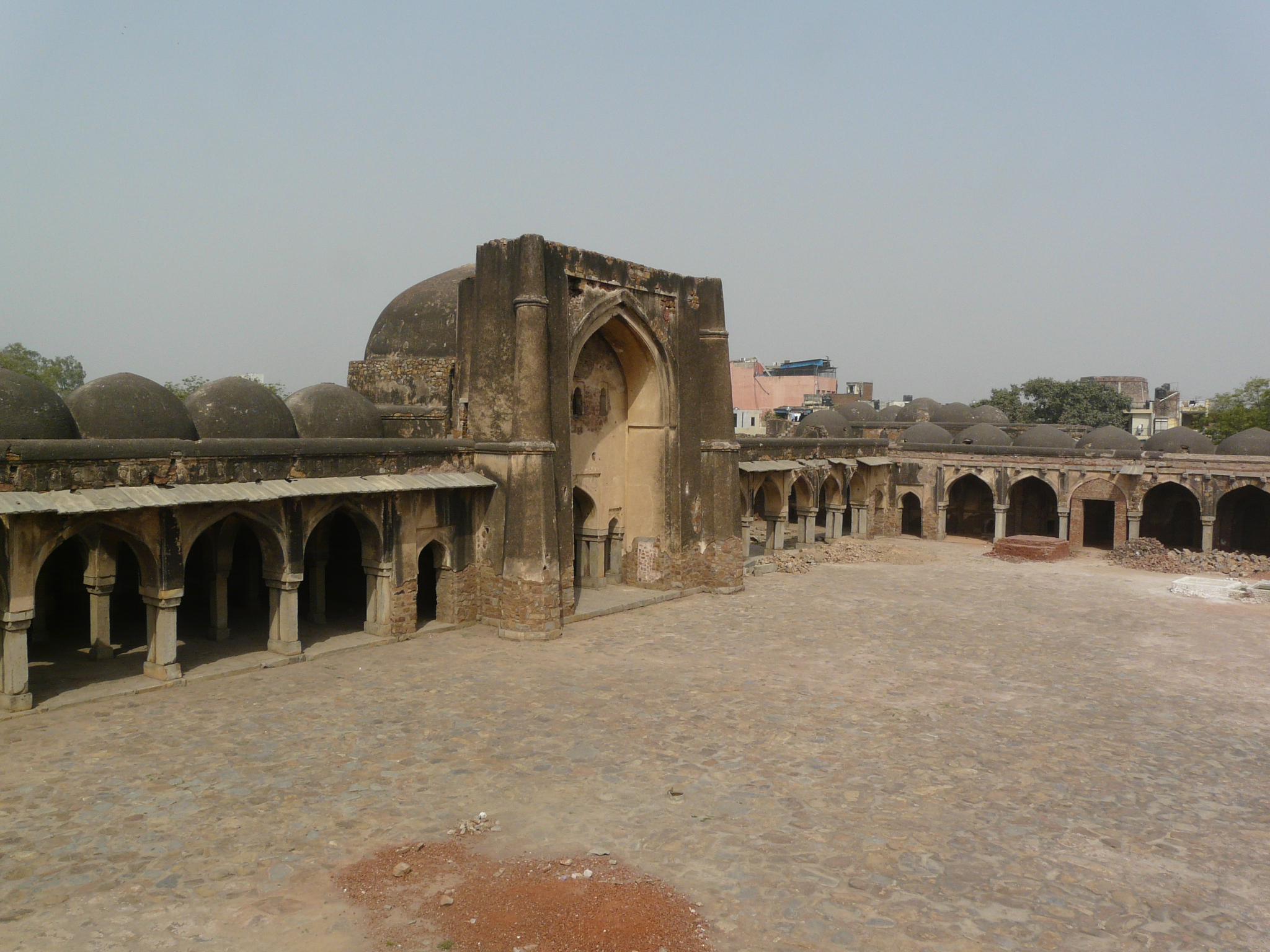
- View of the Bishtak from the courtyard

- Location of the former mosque in Central Delhi

Religion
- Affiliation: Islam (former)
- Ecclesiastical or organizational status: Mosque )former)
- Status: Inactive; (partial ruinous state)

Location
- Location: South Delhi, Delhi NCT
- Country: India
- Interactive map of Begumpur Mosque
- Administration: Archaeological Survey of India
- Coordinates: 28°37′34″N 77°12′01″E

Architecture
- Architect: Zahiruddin alJuyush
- Type: Mosque architecture
- Style: Tughluqid; Indo-Islamic; Timurid
- Completed: 1343; 683 years ago

Specifications
- Length: 94 m (308.4 ft)
- Width: 90 m (295.3 ft)
- Dome: 64
- Materials: Rubble; masonry; red sandstone; marble; tiles

Monument of National Importance
- Official name: Begampuri Masjid
- Reference no.: N-DL-8

The Begumpur Mosque or Begumpur Masjid, (Note: Various alternative spelling includes: Begumpuri Masjid and Begampuri Masjid.) also known as the Jam'i Masjid of Jahanpanah, is a former Friday mosque, now in partial ruins, located in an urban village called Begumpur, which now bears its modern name, Jahanpanah. The former mosque was built in the centre of the sultanate capital of the Tughluq dynasty, in c. 1343 CE. The former mosque is large, measuring 94 by 90 metres (307 by 295 ft).

The former mosque is a Monument of National Importance, administered by the Archaeological Survey of India in order to restore the monument.

== History ==
Jahanpanah means "the centre of the world," and the village was built by the order of Muhammad bin Tughluq in 1327 CE. The founding of this city aimed to protect the sultanate against any external invasion. The city had thirteen gates and numerous monuments that were credited to the Tughluq dynasty.

Knowledge of the history of the Begumpur Mosque is somewhat limited, as the identity of its patrons is unclear, with two theories in place. The first theory suggests that it was built during the reign of Muhammad bin Tughluq in 1343 CE, by or under the guidance of the Iranian architect Zahiruddin al-Juyush, also credited with the construction of the Khurramabad Palace. The second theory suggests that it was built by Khan-i Jahan Junan Shah, vizier of Firuz Shah Tughluq, as one of the seven mosques built under his patronage.

=== Use ===
After serving as a mosque for several decades, the structure was used as a village in the early twentieth century before the restoration and cleaning.

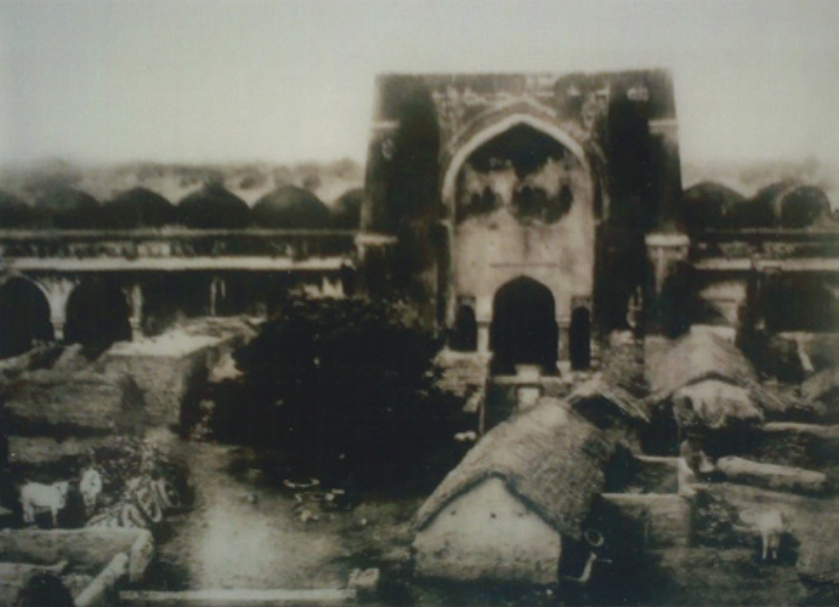
The mosque before clearing, early twentieth century

In 1902, Herbert Charles Fanshawe wrote:

"The Begumpuri Masjid is the finest of the mosques built by Jahan Khan, and well deserves a visit, although the arcades of the mosque are occupied by a village, in which some English refugees were long concealed in 1857. … it is the next largest at Delhi to the Jama Masjid of Shahjehan."

The site currently is under the supervision of the Archeological Survey of India. Presently, the site does not serve any religious purposes.

== Architecture ==
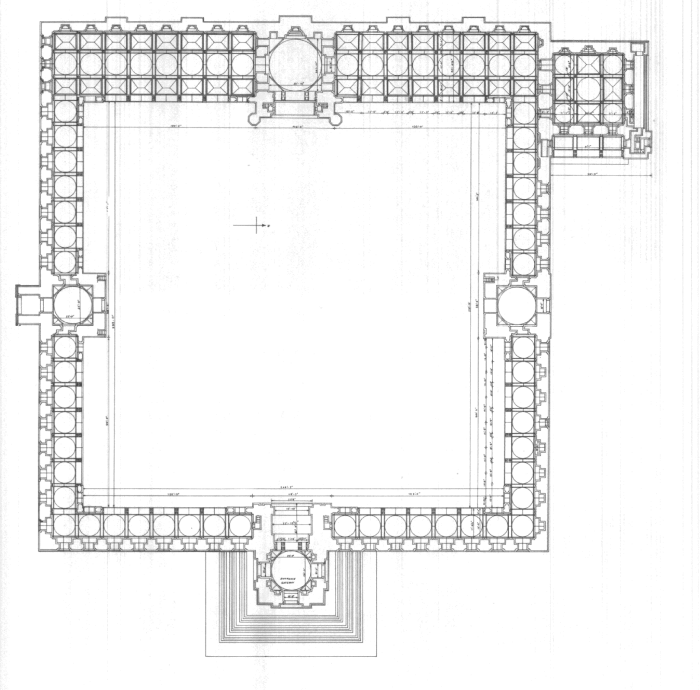
Ground floor plan

The dimensions of the mosque are 94 by 90 metres (307 by 295 ft). The courtyard plan of the mosque is influenced by the Timurid type. The mosque contains four riwaqs (portico) and an enormous sahn (courtyard) measuring 75 by 65 metres (246 by 213 ft). A deeper prayer hall, facing Mecca, is located to the west and is the largest riwaq. The mosque is entered from only the eastern side through a magnificent gate. On the northern façade of the Begumpur Masjid, stands a square structure known as muluk khana (The Royal Loggia), which functions as a private entrance and a prayer hall for the royals.

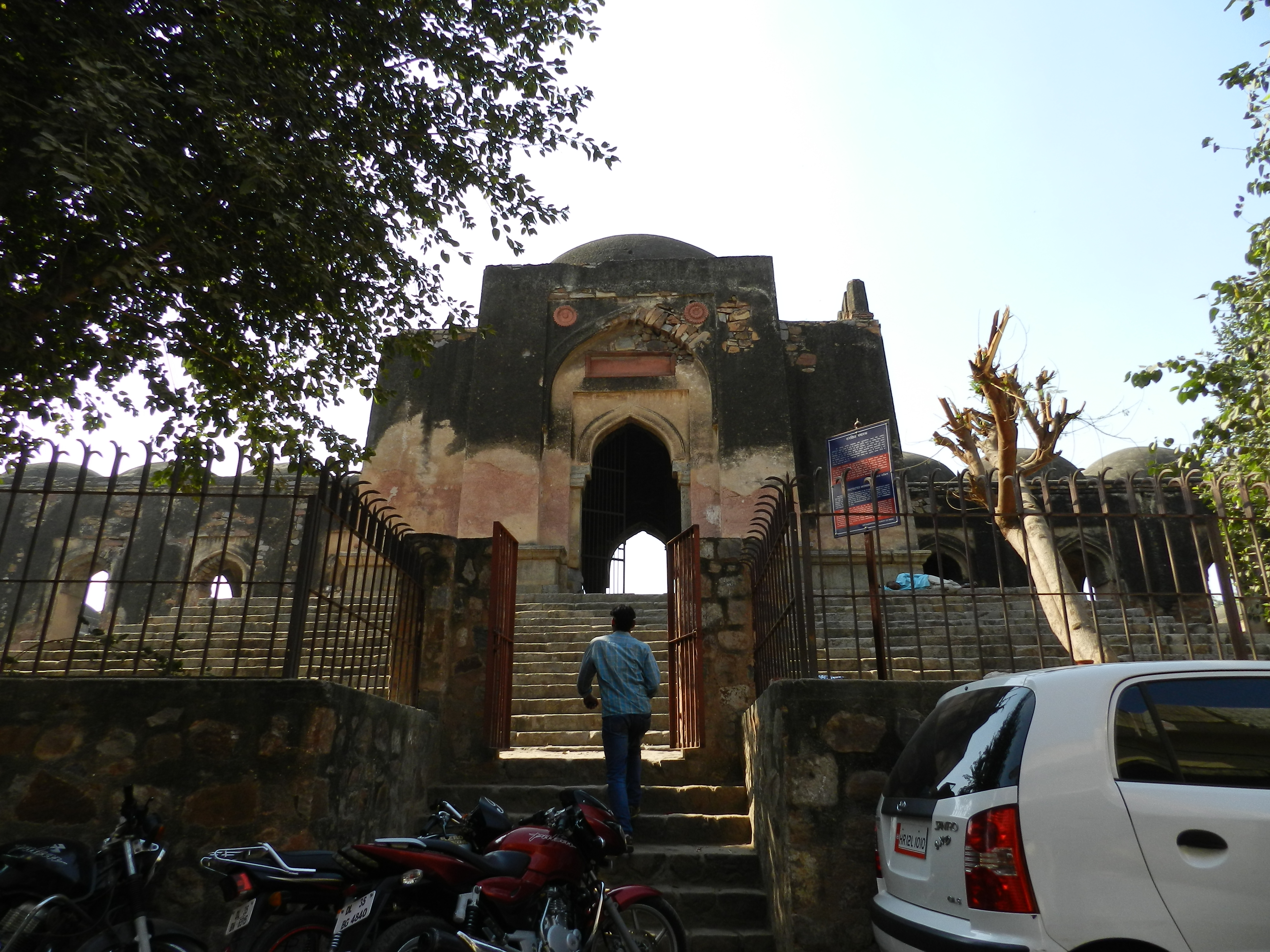
Entrance gateway

=== Exterior ===
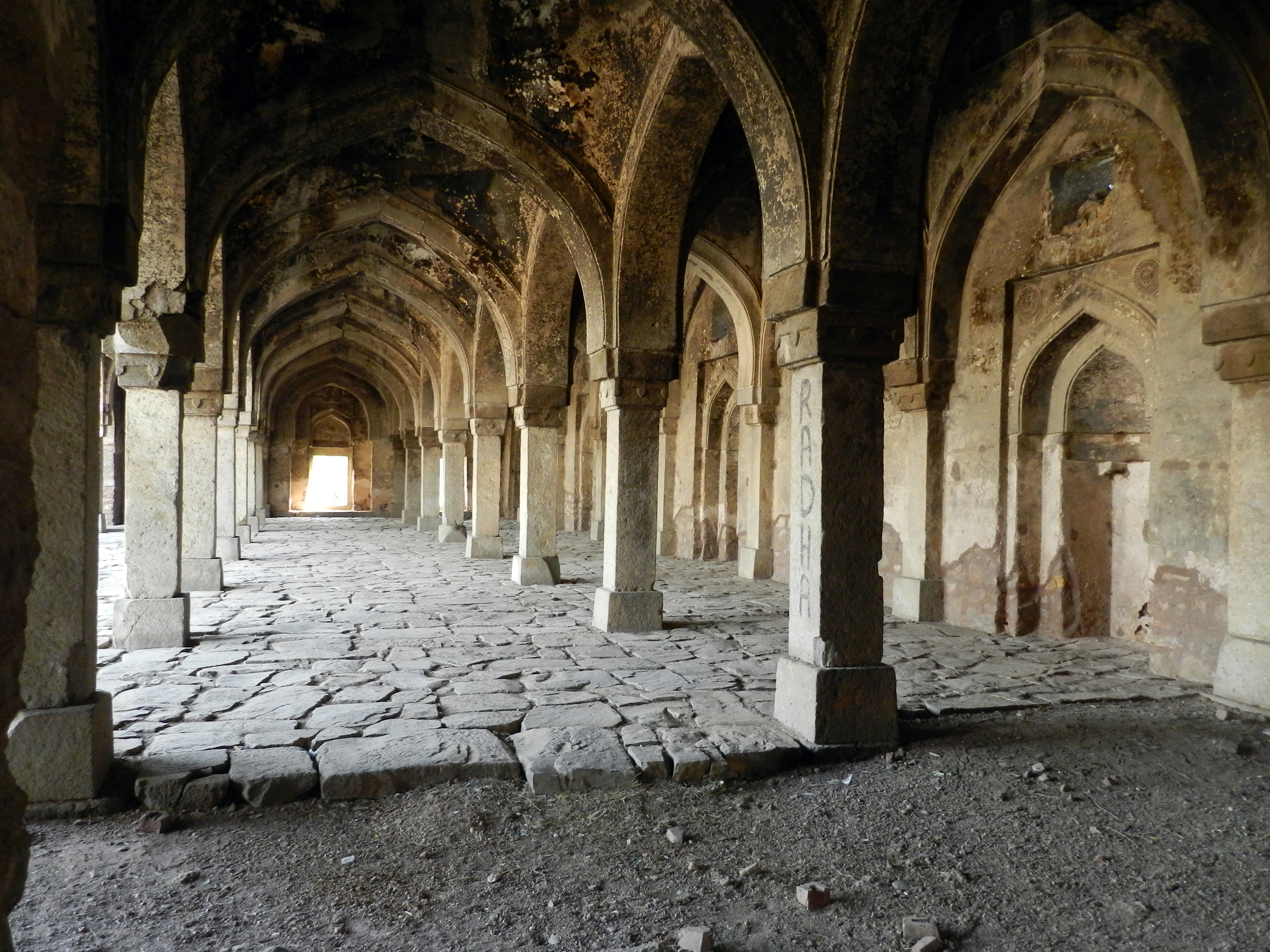
Pillared corridor

The Begumpur Mosque has an enormous domed entrance structure that stands tall above the street level, accessed by three-sided vertical steps. Unlike the Khirki or Kotla mosques, the ground floor is not used for the excavated niches. The mosque's walls represent the Tughluq slope walls, consisting of rubble masonry, which has been covered with a layer of thick stucco. The walls were originally decorated with blue-glazed tiles that are still present in some places.

=== Interior ===
The four-iwan plan was introduced for the first time in Indo-Islamic architecture. There is an iwan and a dome in the middle of each riwaq. The arches on each riwaq are approximately 3.7 metres (12 ft) high, and 5.0 metres (16.5 ft) wide, There are about 45 rooms distributed in all the four sides of the mosque. The main hall is covered by a large dome while smaller domes are constructed over the bays of the colonnades. There are two tapering turrets on both sides of the starts of the iwan, which is a unique feature of the Tughluq architectural style. This structure, referred to as a "pylon" is very large enough to hide the large domes that cover the prayer hall.

=== Material and decoration ===
The materials in the Begumpur Mosque are mainly rubble masonry covered with mortar, which was molded to fit its architectural forms. Red sandstone was also used for the decorative carved motifs and for the jalis of the muluk khana and it was also used in the "royal" mihrab. The mosque had a lot of decorative carved stucco, much of it has now disappeared or been restored. The building in its current condition lost a lot of its original ornamentations. It still has remains of blooming lotuses relief-carved in red sandstone. Most of the sixty-four domes of the mosque feature this lotus motif. Regrettably, many of these domes either collapsed or were covered with white plaster.

=== Mihrabs ===
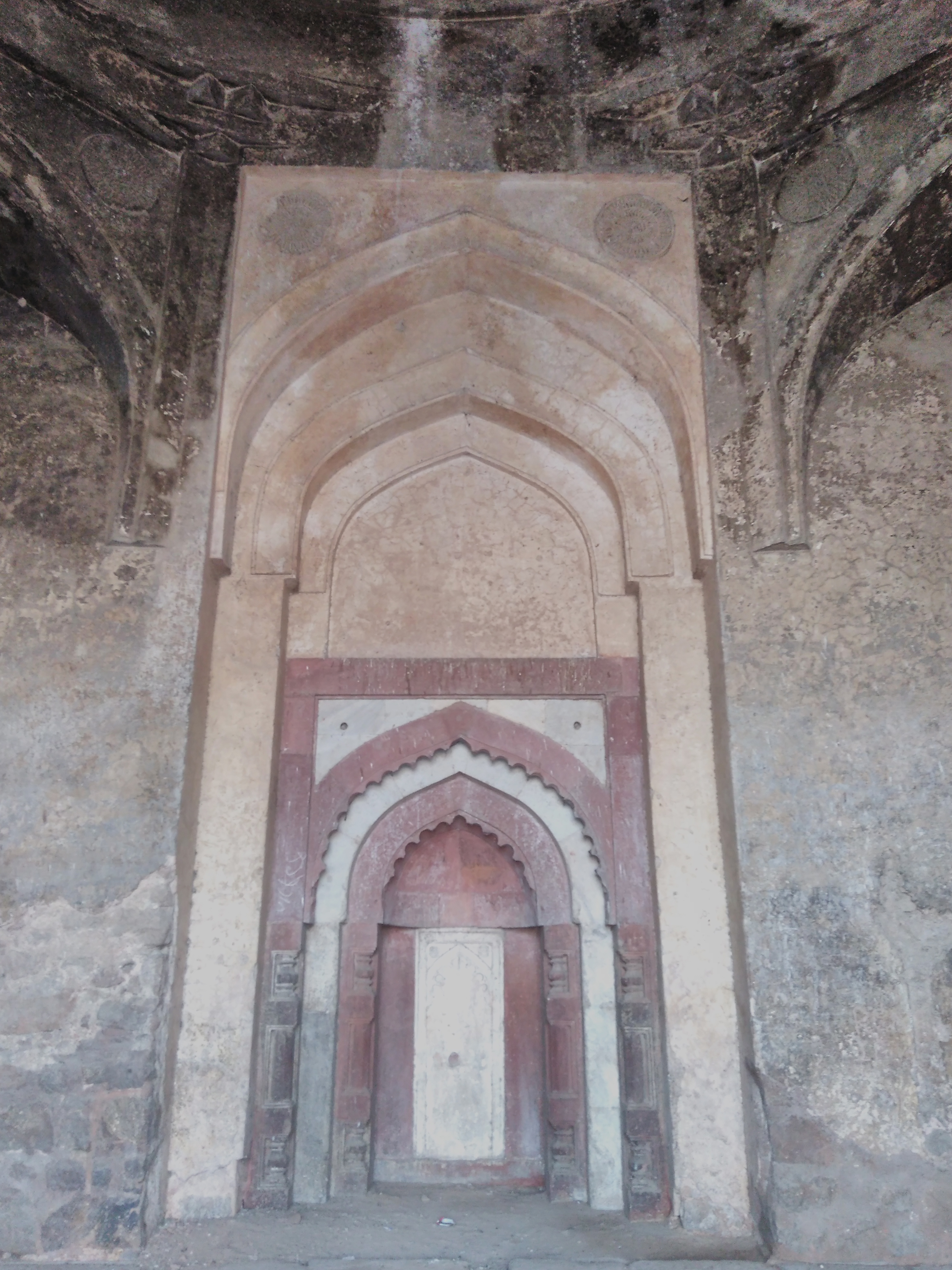
The main mihrab

The main mihrab showcases a two-color palette reminiscent of the 'Ala'i Darwaza. The materials used in the mihrab are red sandstone and white marble, which are very common material compositions of the Indo-Islamic style. The mihrab inside the Ghiyath al-Din Tughluq tomb at Tughluqabad has also common features; aesthetics, proportions and the use of red sandstone and white marble.

=== Epigraphy ===
A few inscriptions remain within the monument. Invocations to Allah can be found at the entrance and the muluk khana. Within the muluk khana, there are three epigraphic medallions above the central mihrab. Their inscriptions are in classical thuluth, featuring Quranic quotations from Surah 3 ('Al ‘Imran).

=== Influences ===
The Begumpur Mosque has a number of similar features to Quwwat al-Islam Complex. Both have their monumental external approaches, narrow riwaqs and their cupolas marking the four directions, thus privileging the cruciform plan. Both monuments share a certain "community of vision." The bishtak of the Begumpur Mosque exhibits a clear influence from the Timurid style of Bibi-Khanym Mosque. They are almost identical in their main feature; sloping towers and the OGEE arches, however, the Bibi Khanym is richer in decoration.

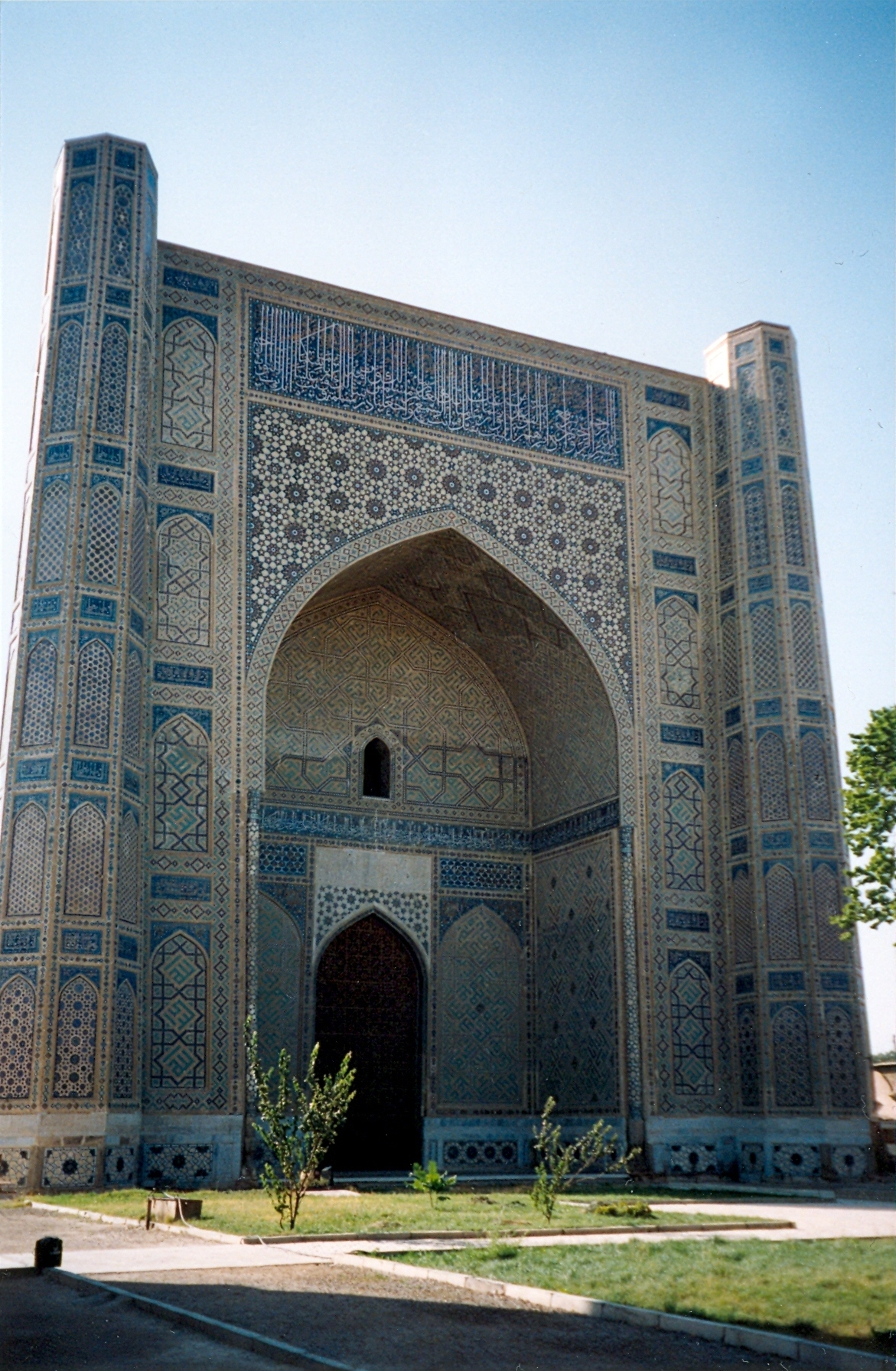
Bishtak of Bibi Khanym Mosque

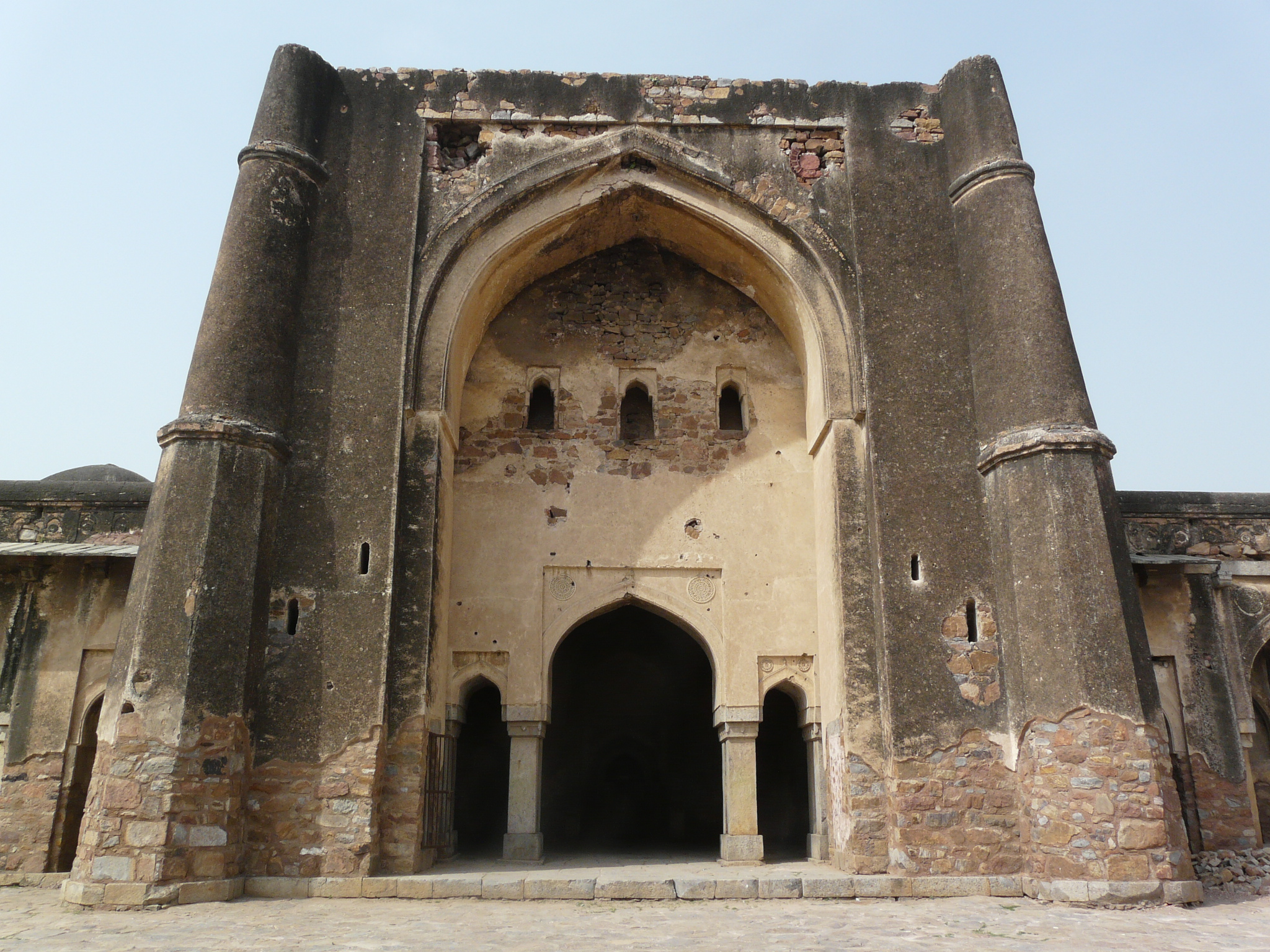
Bishtak of Begumpur Mosque

== Closure ==
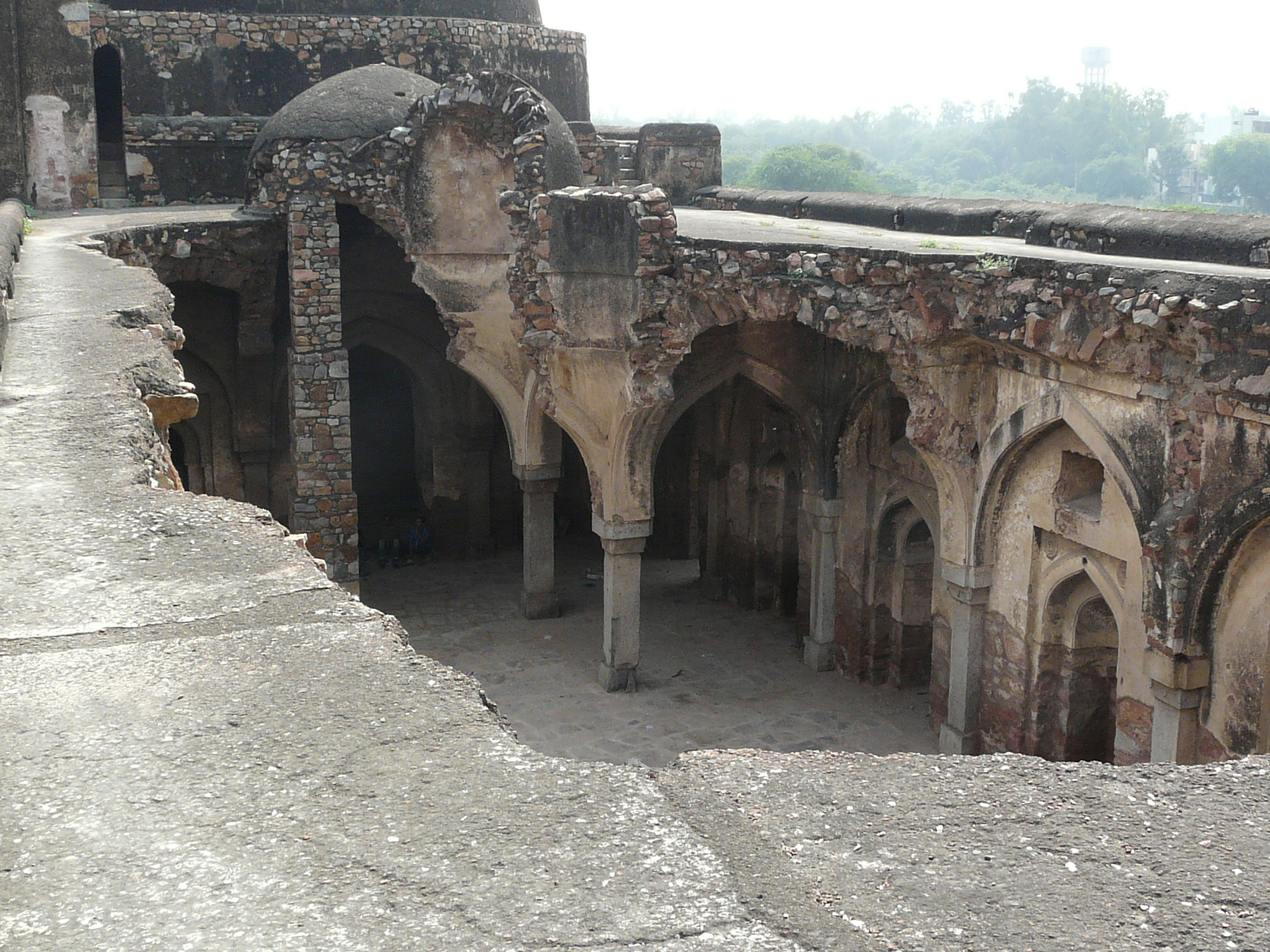
The broken roof, in 2008

The continuous expansion and the increasing population, have resulted in a situation of overcrowding within the region. It is worth noting that the Begumpur Mosque is being protected under the Archeological Survey of India and as mentioned above, presently, the site does not function as a mosque. There are currently no plans in place for the restoration to safeguard its historical significance. At present, the monument is not in a good state, with many fallen domes and broken roofs.

== Gallery ==
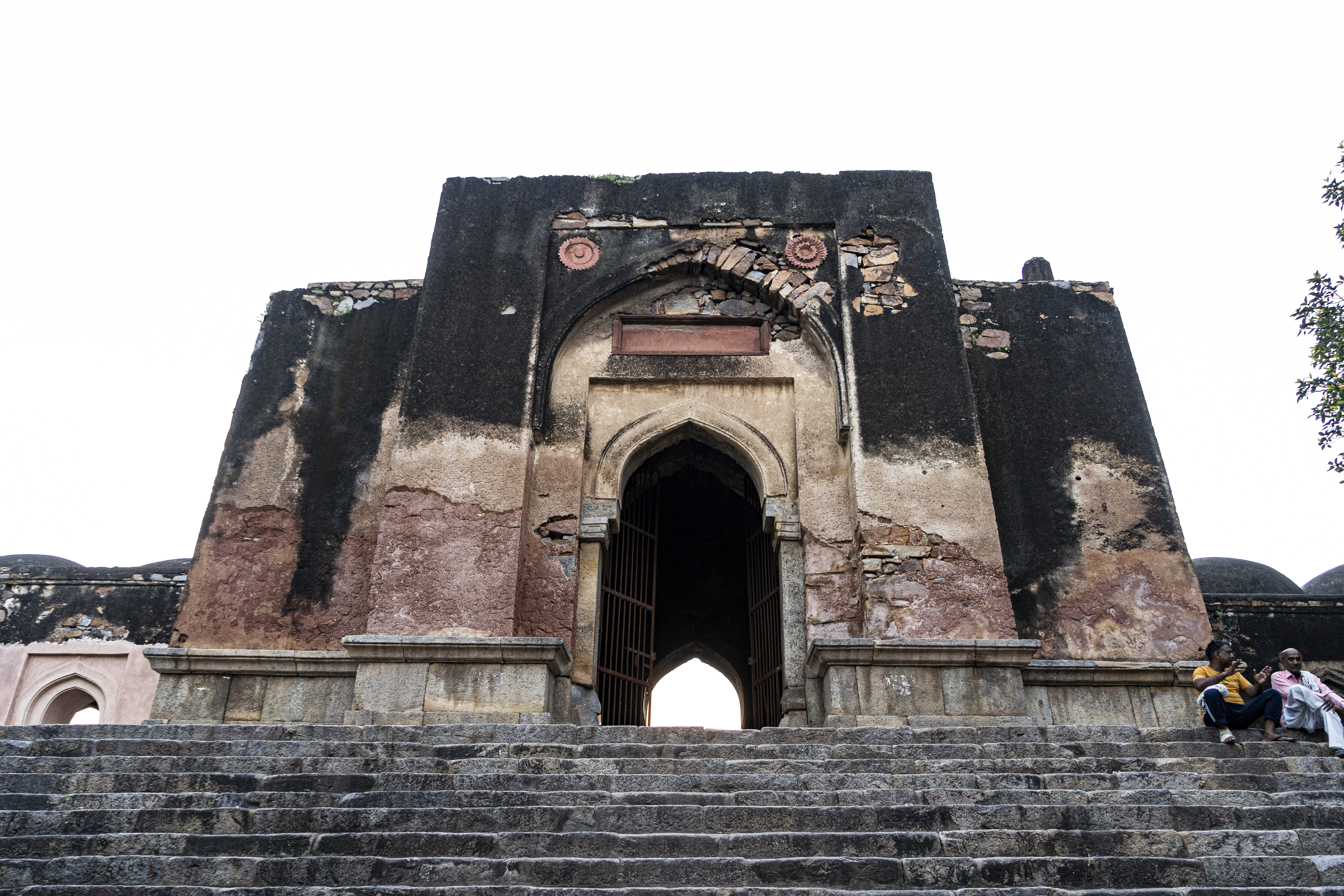
Entrance to the mosque

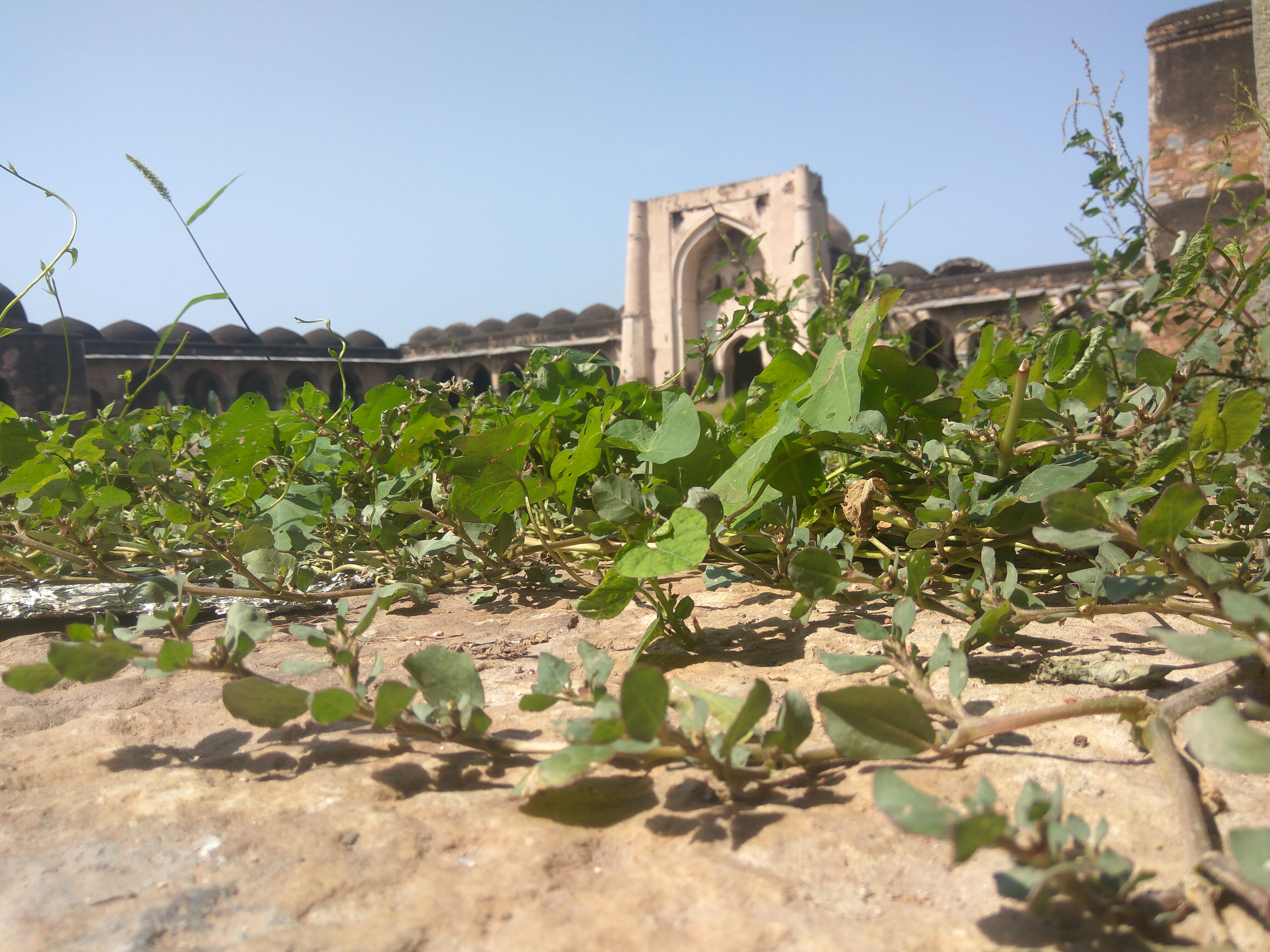
View of the Bishtak from the courtyard

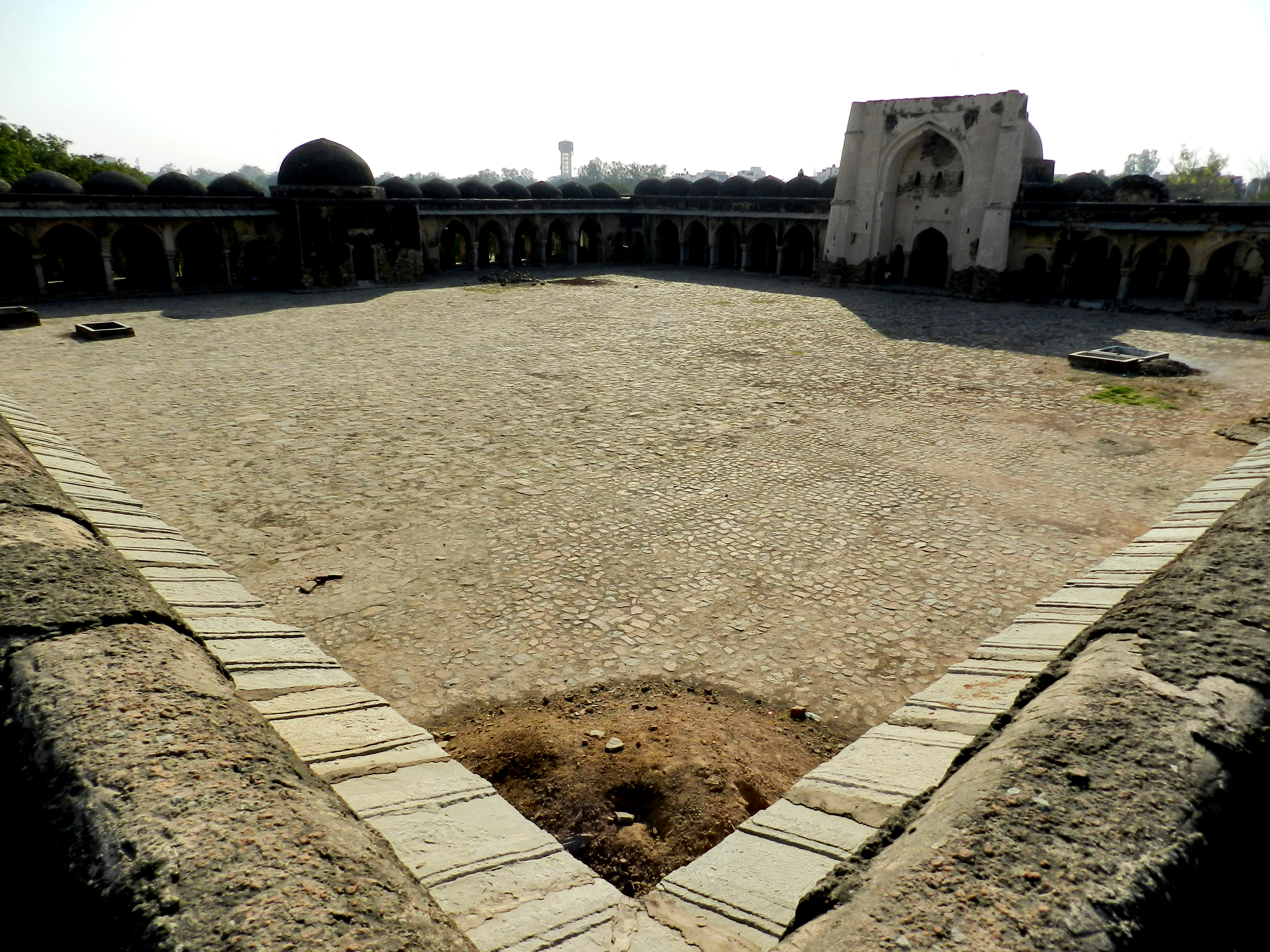
Overview of the courtyard

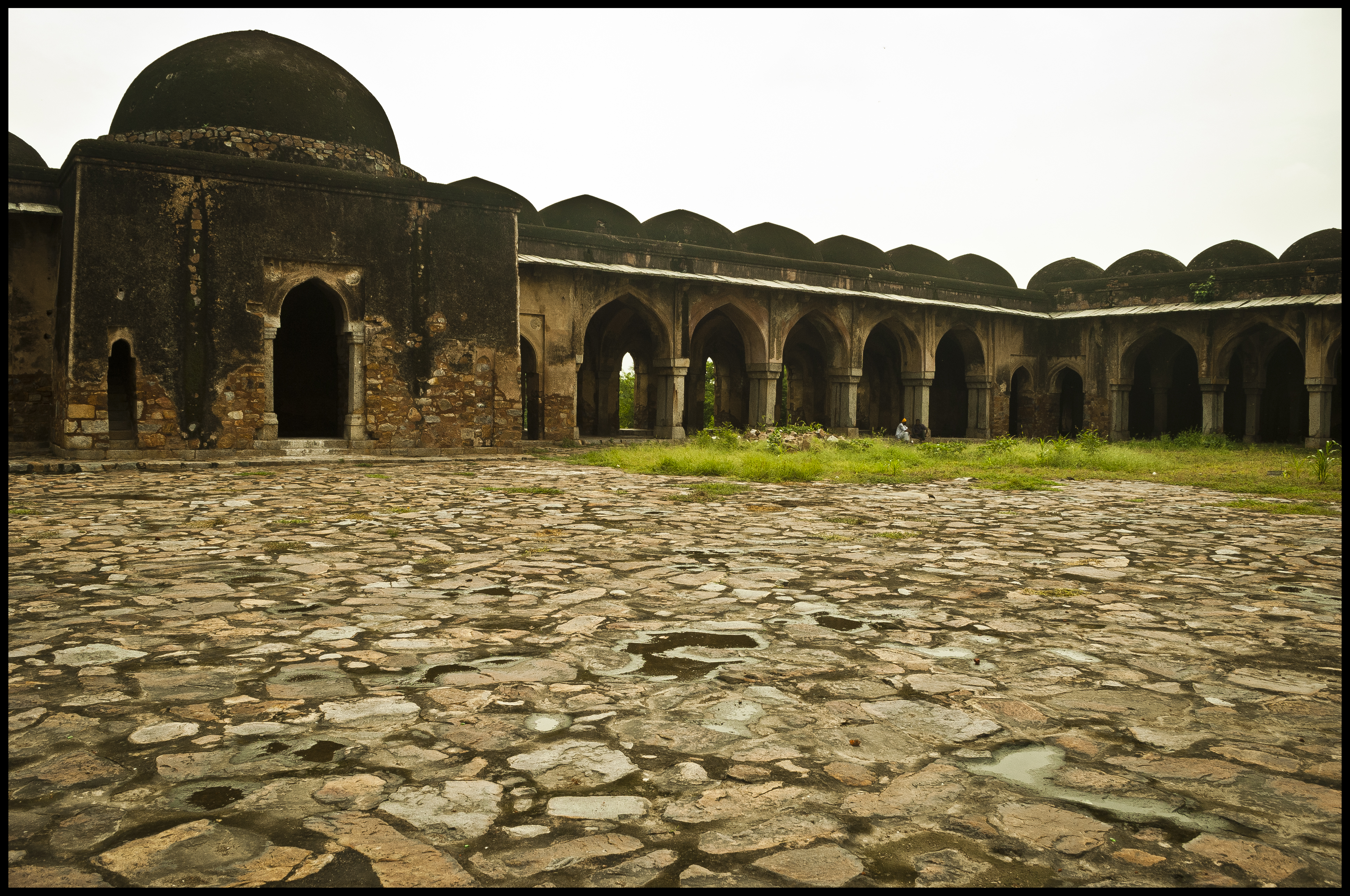
View of the courtyard

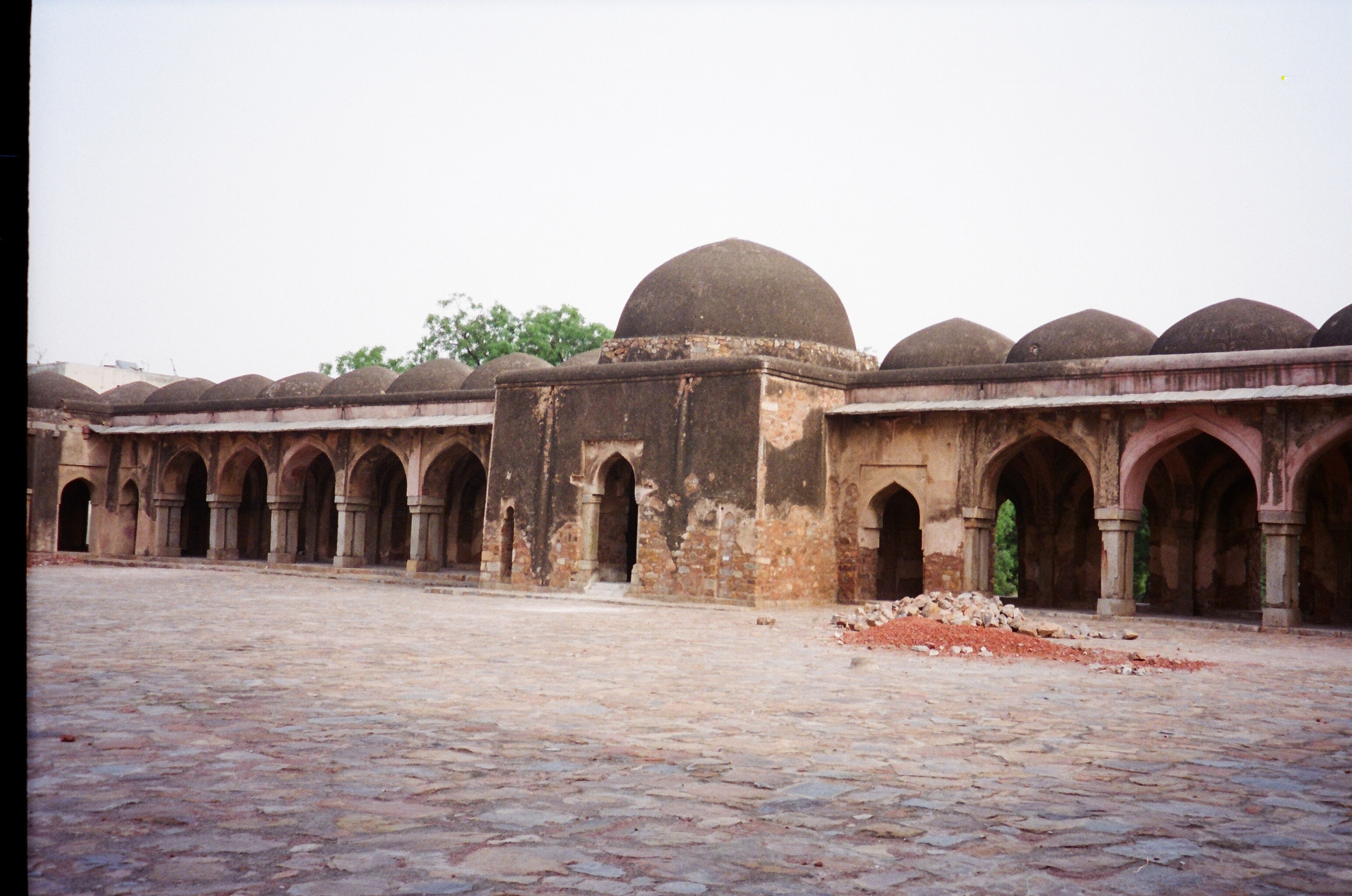
South wall of the mosque

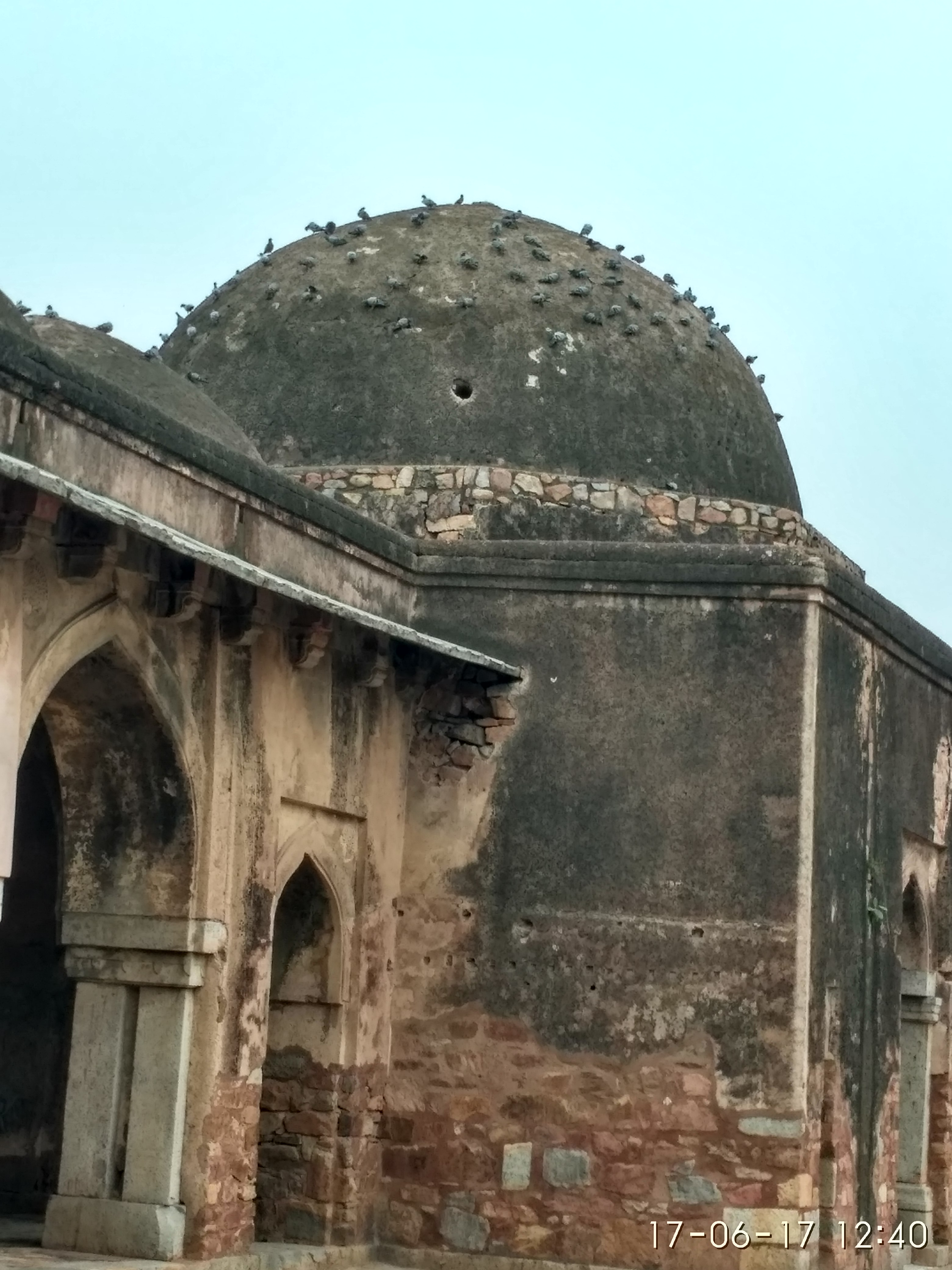
View of one of the domes

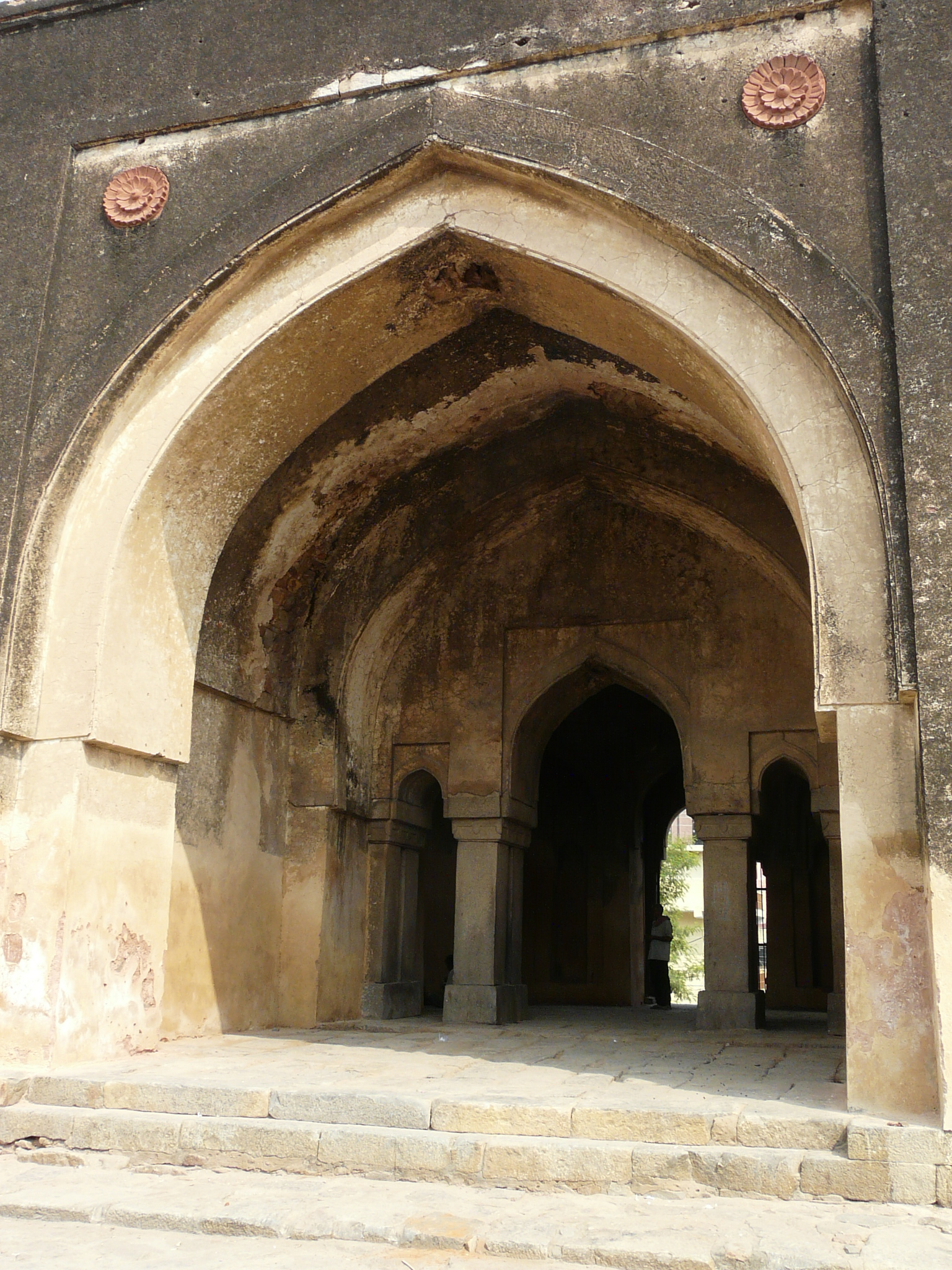
Eastern Iwan details

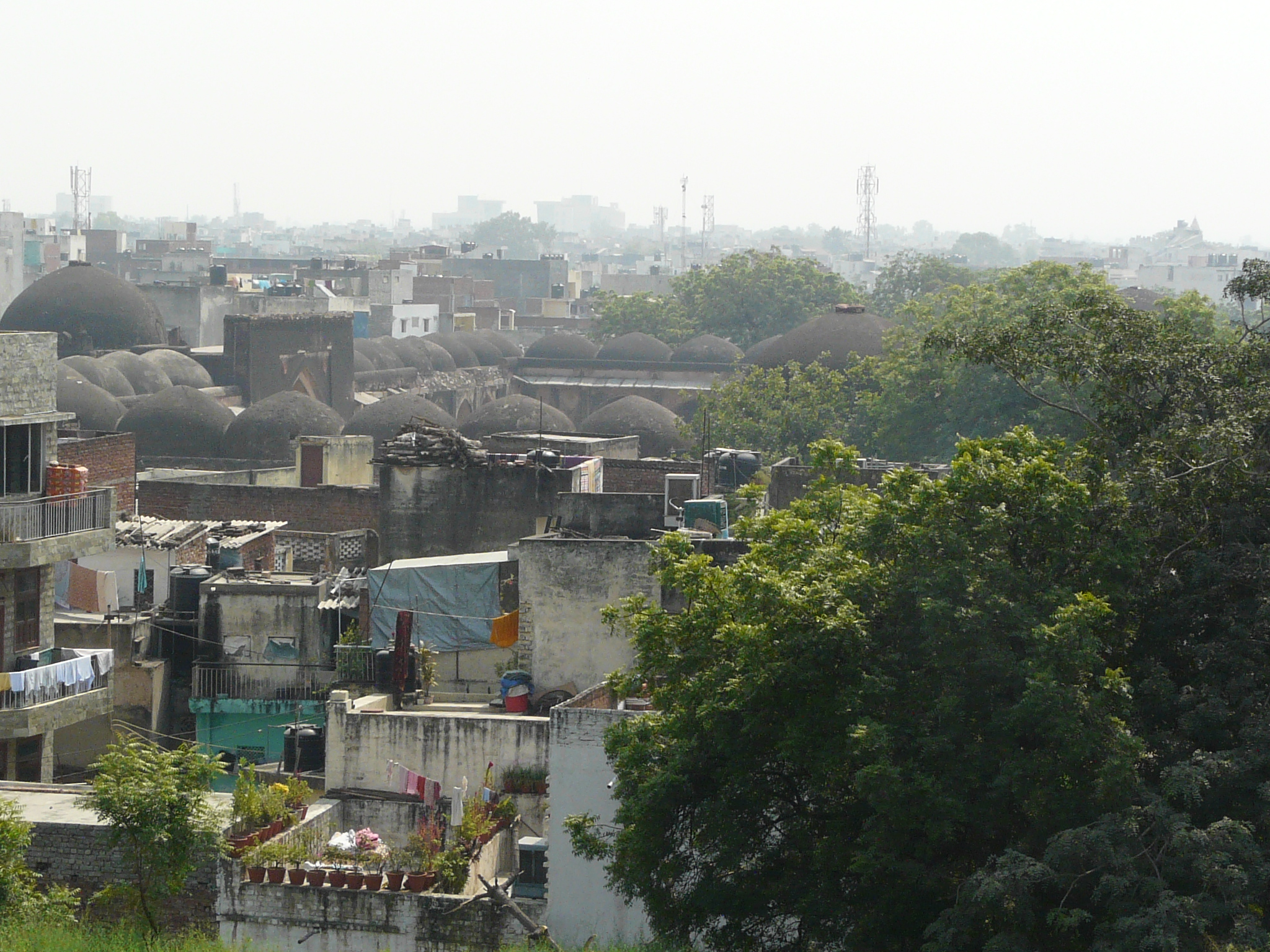
The mosque with its surroundings

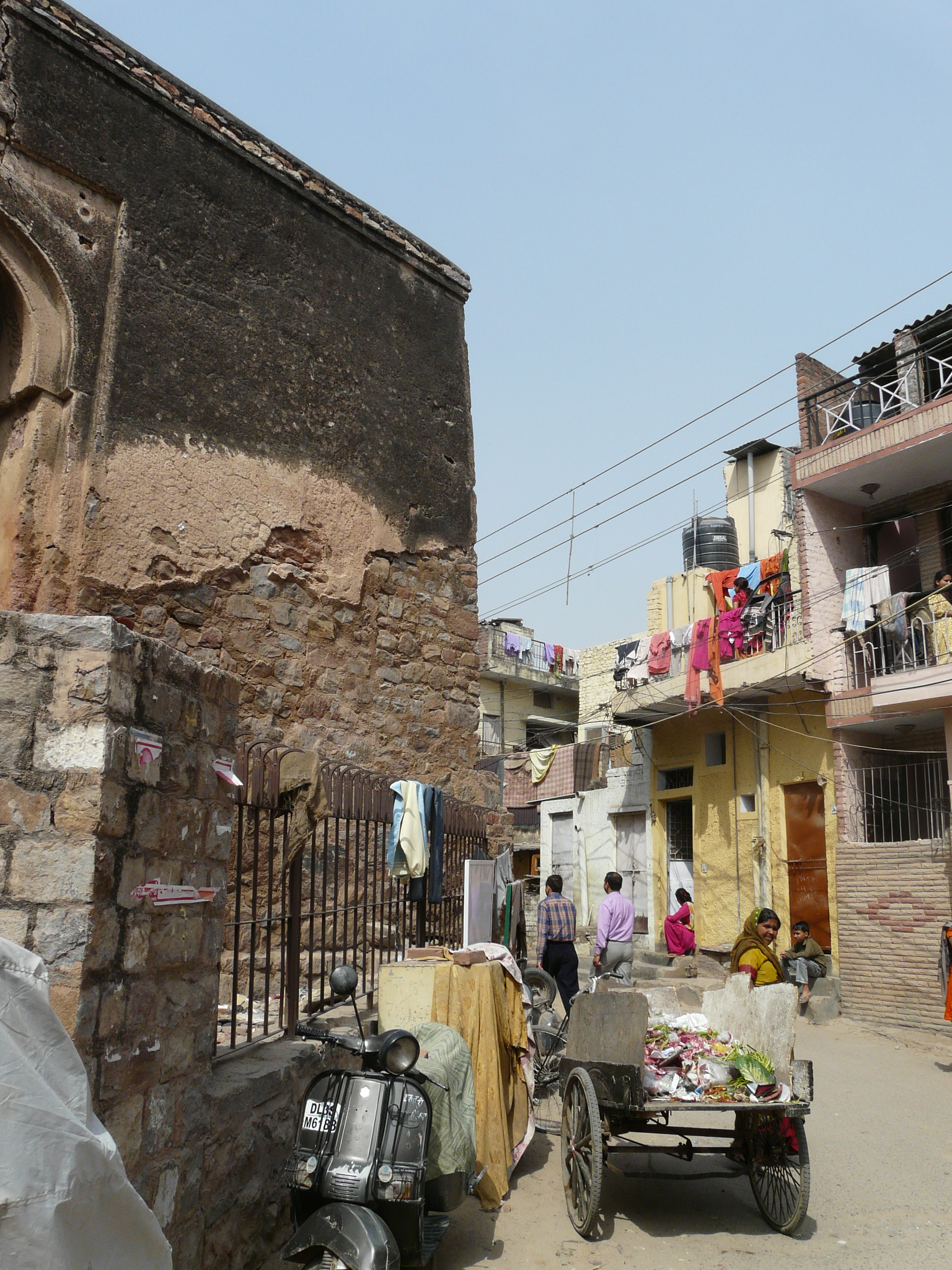
The mosque with its surroundings

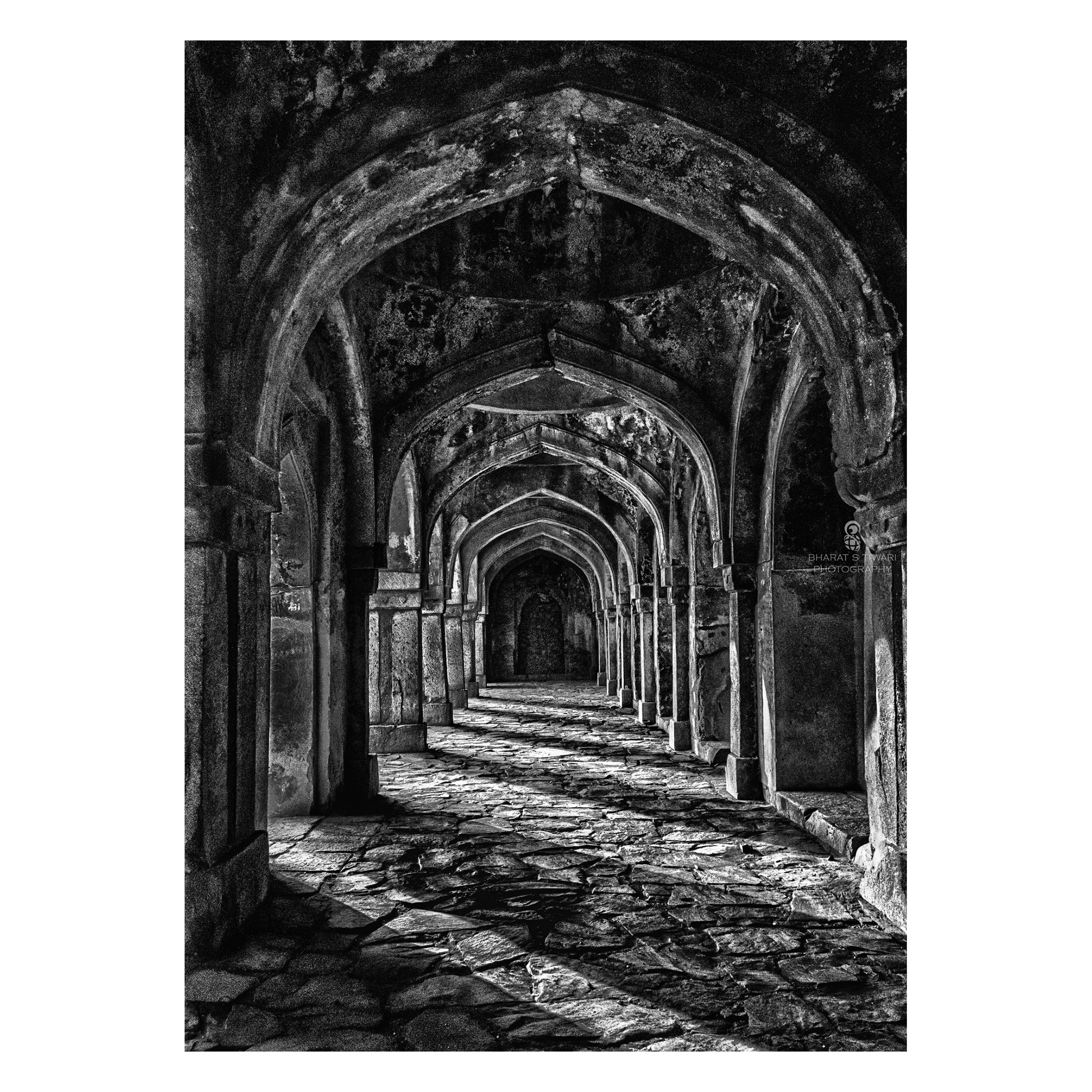
View of the arcades

== See also ==
- Islam in India
- List of mosques in India
- List of Monuments of National Importance in Delhi
