= Hauz-i-Shamsi =

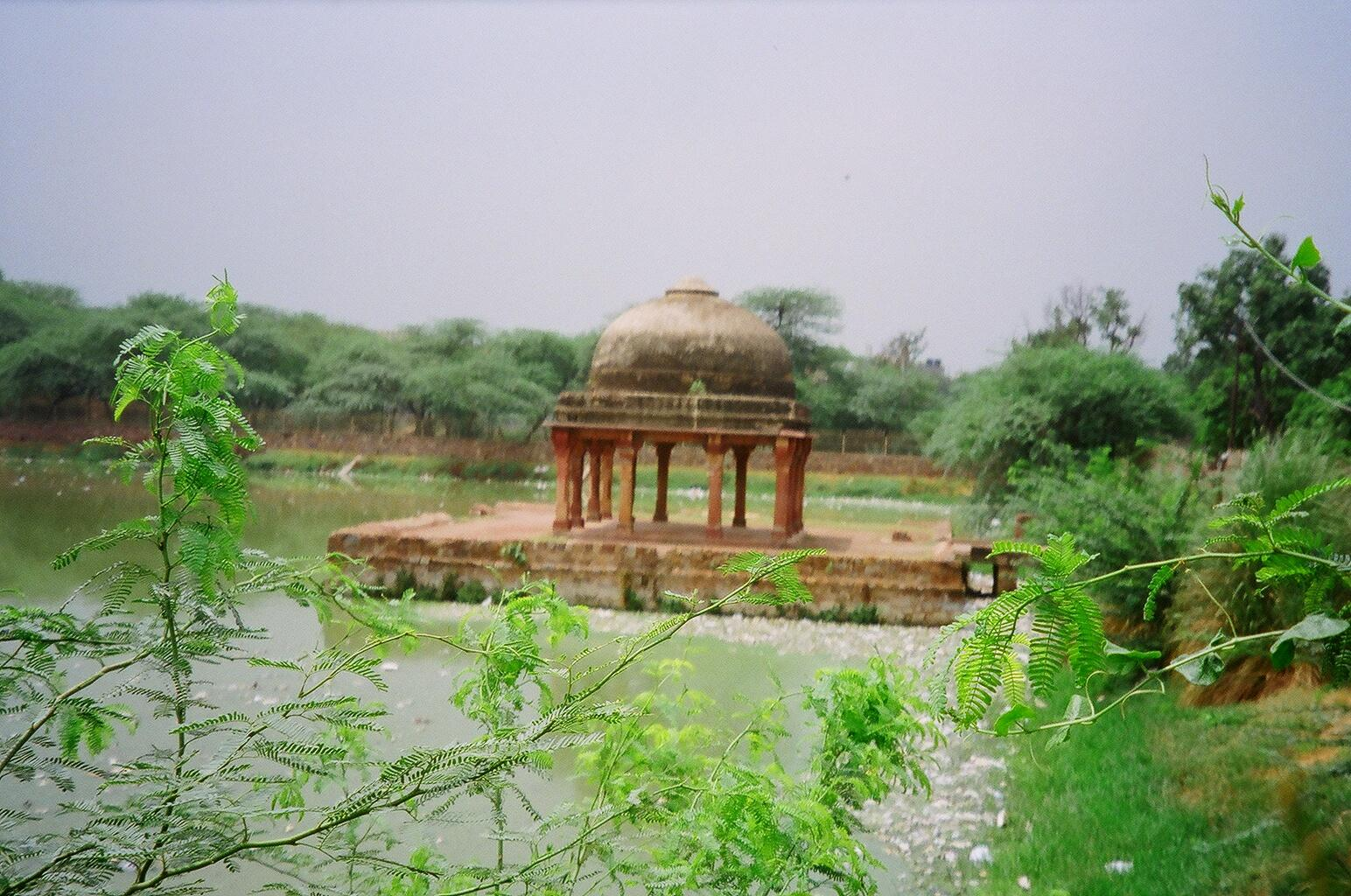
- View of the pavilion in Hauz-i-Shamsi

- Location within Delhi
- Coordinates: 28°30′51″N 77°10′42″E
- Type: Reservoir
- Basin countries: India
- Surface area: 2 ha (5 acres)
- Settlements: Mehrauli

Hauz-i-Shamsi (literally "sunny water tank"), also known as Shamsi Talab, is a water reservoir built by Iltutmish of the Slave Dynasty in 1230 CE. According to legend, its location was revealed to him in a dream by the Islamic prophet Muhammad. A palace known as the Jahaz Mahal was constructed on the eastern edge of the same reservoir during the Lodi dynasty in the 16th century, serving as a retreat or inn for pilgrims. At the edge of Hauz-i-Shamsi stands the tomb of Abdul-Haqq Dehlavi, a 17th-century Persian writer at the Mughal court. The monuments are situated in the sprawling environs of Mehrauli, Delhi, near the Qutb Minar.

== Legend ==
A popular legend narrated is of Iltumish's dream in which Muhammad directed him to build a reservoir at a particular site. When Iltumish inspected the site the day after the dream, he reported to have found a hoof print of Muhammad's horse. He then had a pavilion erected to commemorate the sacred location and excavated a large tank (reservoir) around the pavilion to harvest rain water.

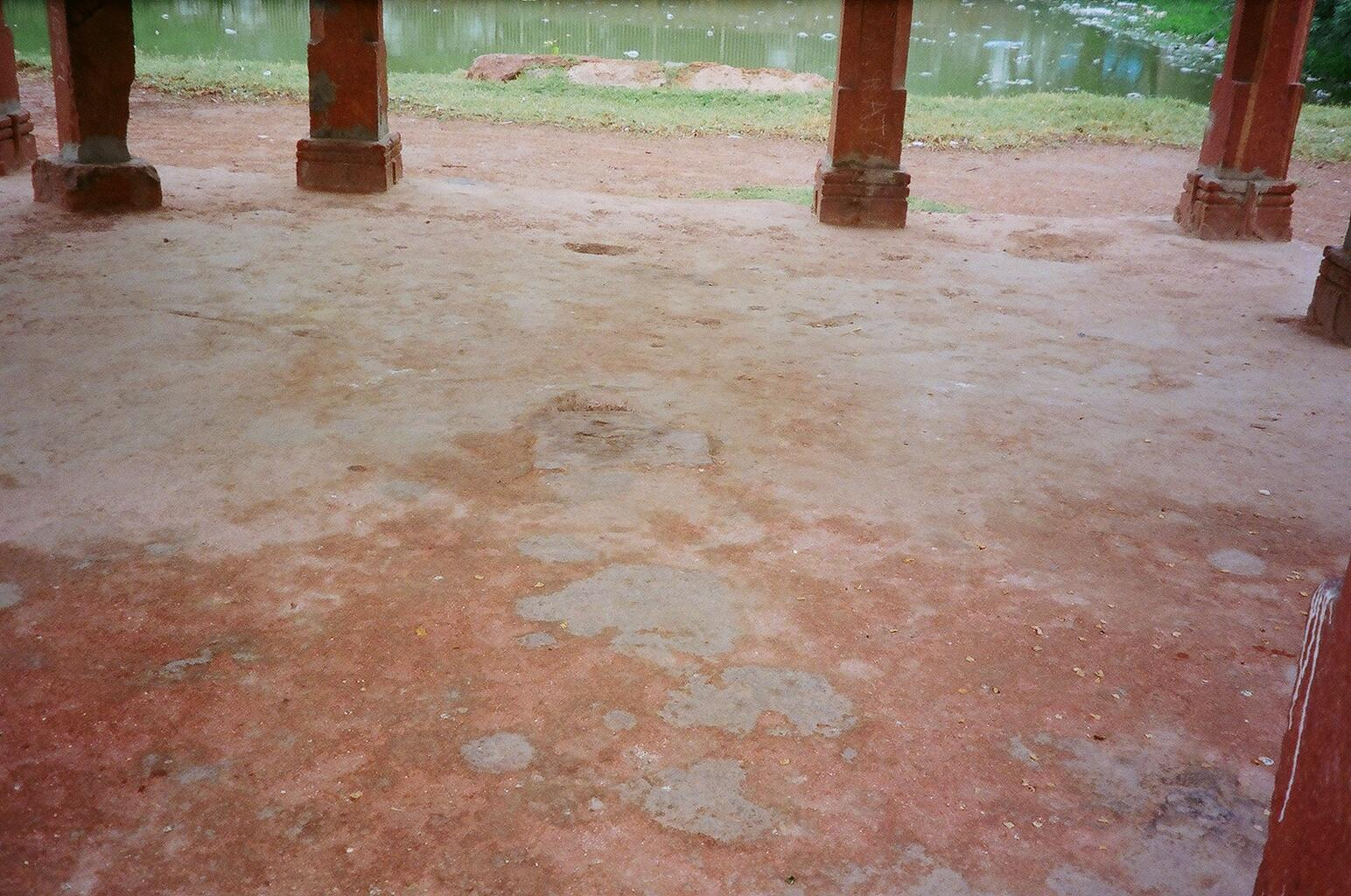
Stone slab depicting imprint of Muhammad's horse's hoof

According to Sharma: "A red stone domed pavilion resting on twelve pillars located near the south-western corner of the tank, but originally believed to have been situated in its centre, is identified with the pavilion built by Iltumish. The original stone with hoof print is believed to have been removed, the present stone being a later renewal. The waters of the tank are regarded as sacred, and several graves of Muslim saints lie around it."

== Reservoir ==
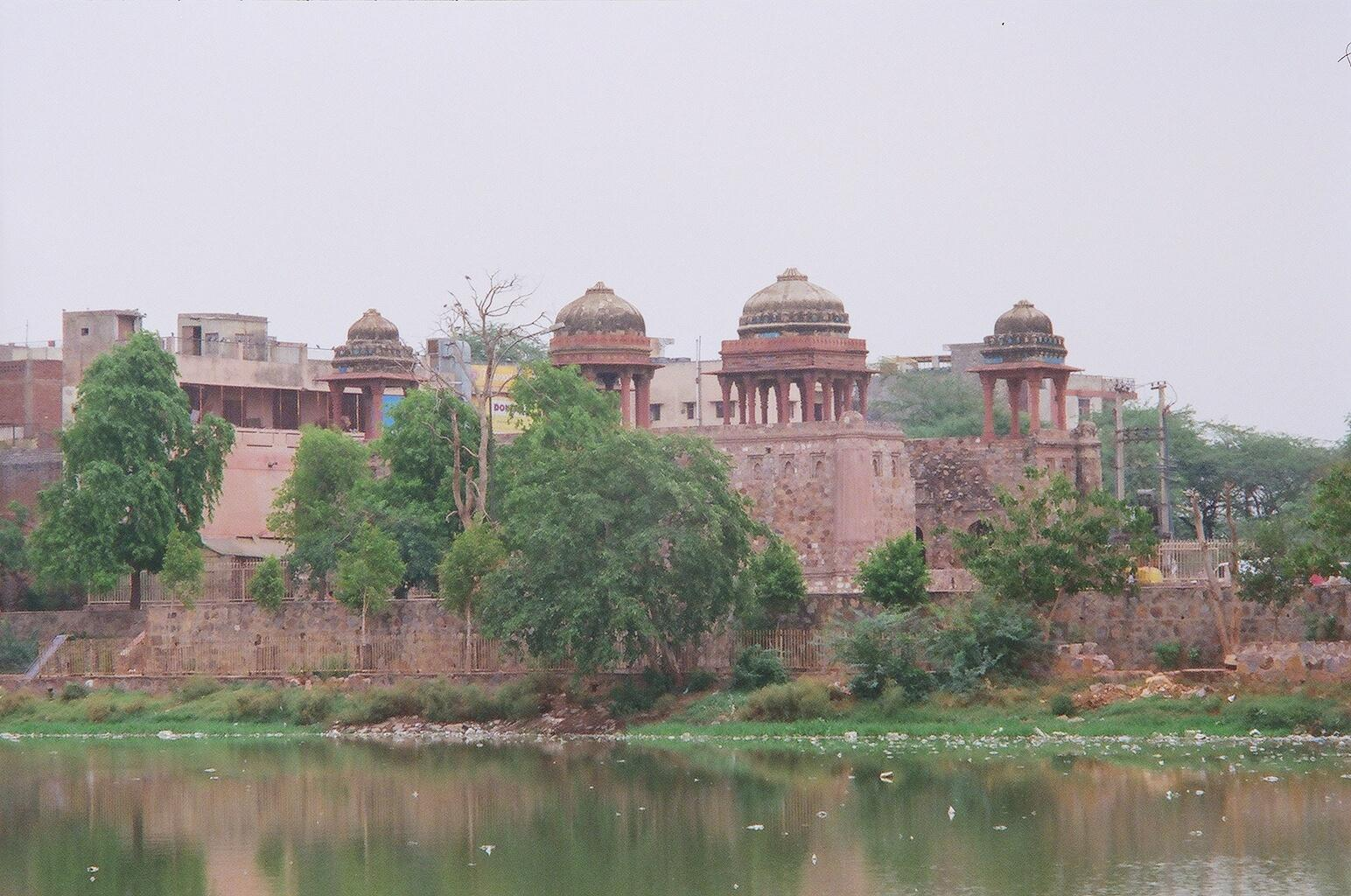
View of Jahaz Mahal from Hauz-i-Shamsi

Hauz-i-Shamsi originally covered an area of 2 ha (4.9 acres). The domed pavilion (pictured) constructed by Iltumish to mark the foot print Muhammad's horse located in the middle of the tank is a double-storeyed structure made of red sandstone supported on twelve pillars. It could be approached only by boat (now a foot-bridge exists). The original stone, on which the foot print of the horse of Muhammad was imprinted, was located at this pavilion. It has since been removed but replaced by a new one. In view of its religious significance, the water stored in the tank was considered sacred. Many prominent emperors and saints have been buried on the periphery of the reservoir. Owing to the reduction in the size of the reservoir over the years on account of encroachments and siltation, the pavilion's present location is seen in the eastern edge of the tank.

Jharna

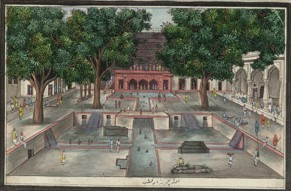
A painting of Hauzi-i-Shamsi feeding a Jharna for the garden with two pavilions

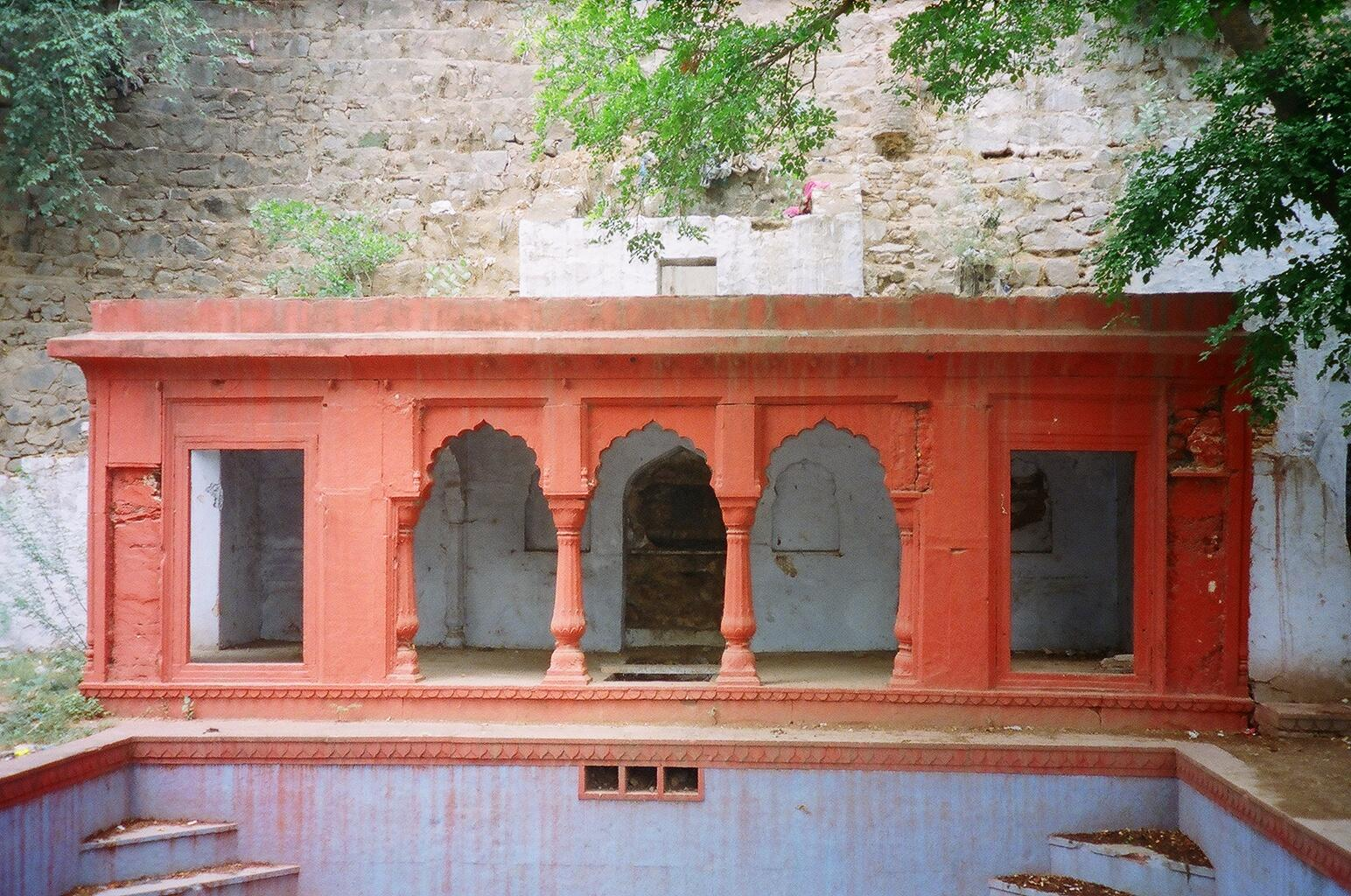
Jharna pavilion built by Akbar Shah II

A Jharna or water fall emanating from the Hauz-i-Shamsi is located close to the Jahaz Mahal. It is identified as a significant water structure that had been developed by Nawab Ghaziuddin around 1700 AD as a pleasure garden during the Mughal rule. An underground pipe (still visible in ruins) supplied the runoff to the Jharna from Hauz-i–Shamshi. This was in addition to an open channel close by that carried the overflow of the tank to Tughlaqabad fort to enhance the drinking water supply. The Jharna structure was built in three parts (pictured – painting from Metcalfe's album). The first part consisted of the reservoir or the tank, the second part was the water fall and the last part consisted of the fountains. Akbar Shah II built the pavilion on the side and his son Bahadur Shah II added the central pavilion, more in the style of hayat hakhsh pool in the Red Fort. The Jharna, which was once the Mughal retreat and the highlight of the three-day festival of the Phool Walon Ki Sair, is seen now partly in ruins and the surroundings have been encroached upon (25 families are reported to be living here now). The water fall is seen more in the form of a drain in need of urgent restoration measures.

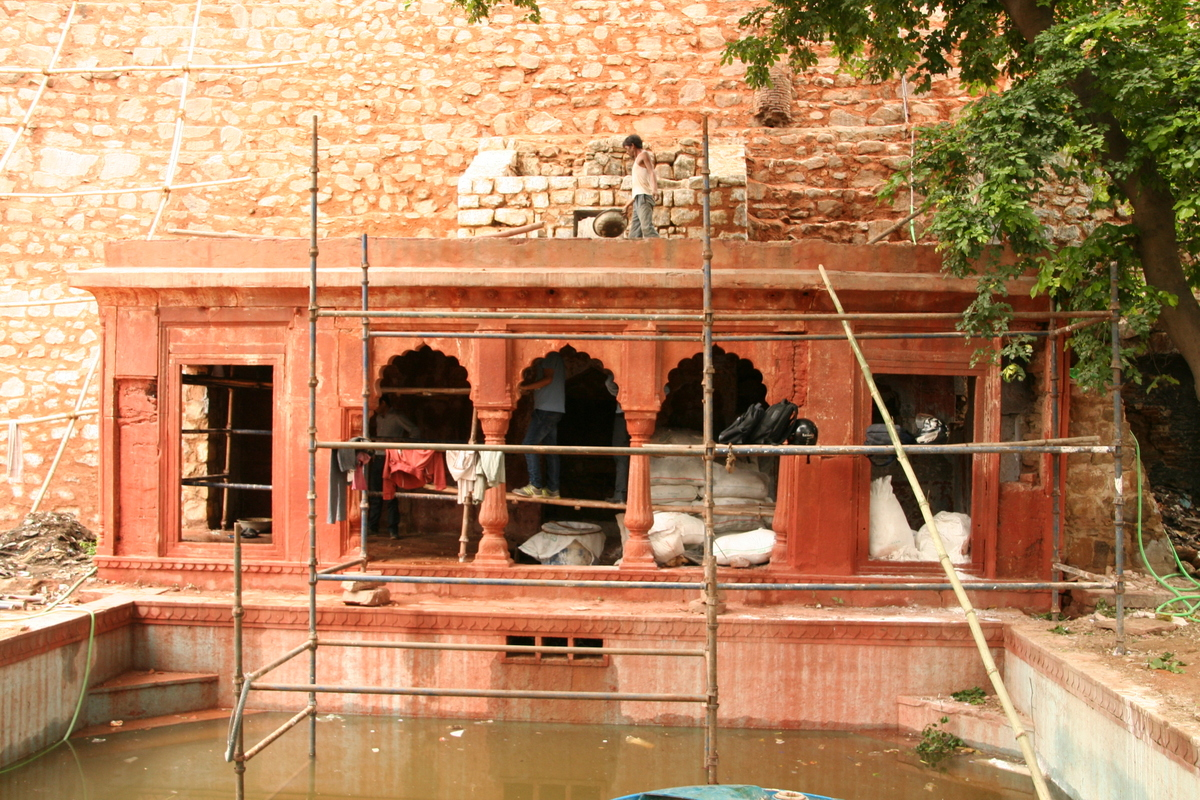
Jharna Restoration in July 2014

== Restoration ==
Hauz-i-Shamsi and the Jharna, which are in state of deterioration, have drawn the attention of the Delhi High Court. The High Court scathingly remarked on the inaction of the concerned authorities on their upkeep of the monuments and observed:

Since 2000, we have been hearing this case and only files are getting thicker. The concerned authorities should now start taking action, seriously.

A conservation architect has remarked:

The Jharna is an extremely significant water structure and connected with protected monuments like Jahaz Mahal and Hauz-i-Shamsid. However, the multiplicity of ownership has led to neglect of the monument. The festival here is held by the MCD and the land otherwise belongs to the DDA. Ideally, the archaeological department or the ASI should take it over along with the MCD and the DDA ensuring that the environment around it is restored and the encroachments removed.

Hauz-i-Shamsi is considered one of the heritage components of Delhi's historic and traditional water management systems and is mandated for conservation under a Delhi High Court ruling.

== Gallery ==
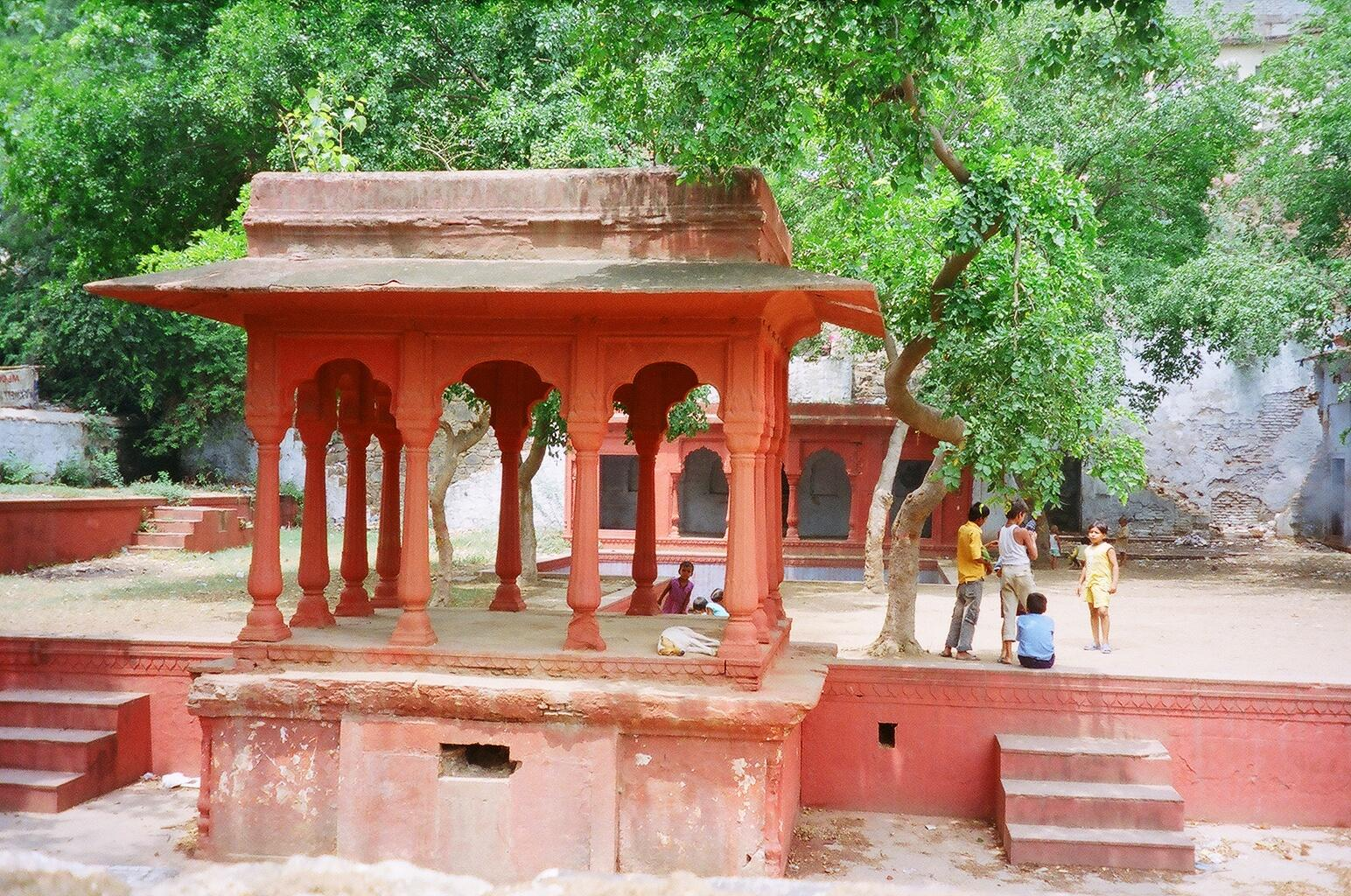
Central pavilion built by Bahadur Shah II

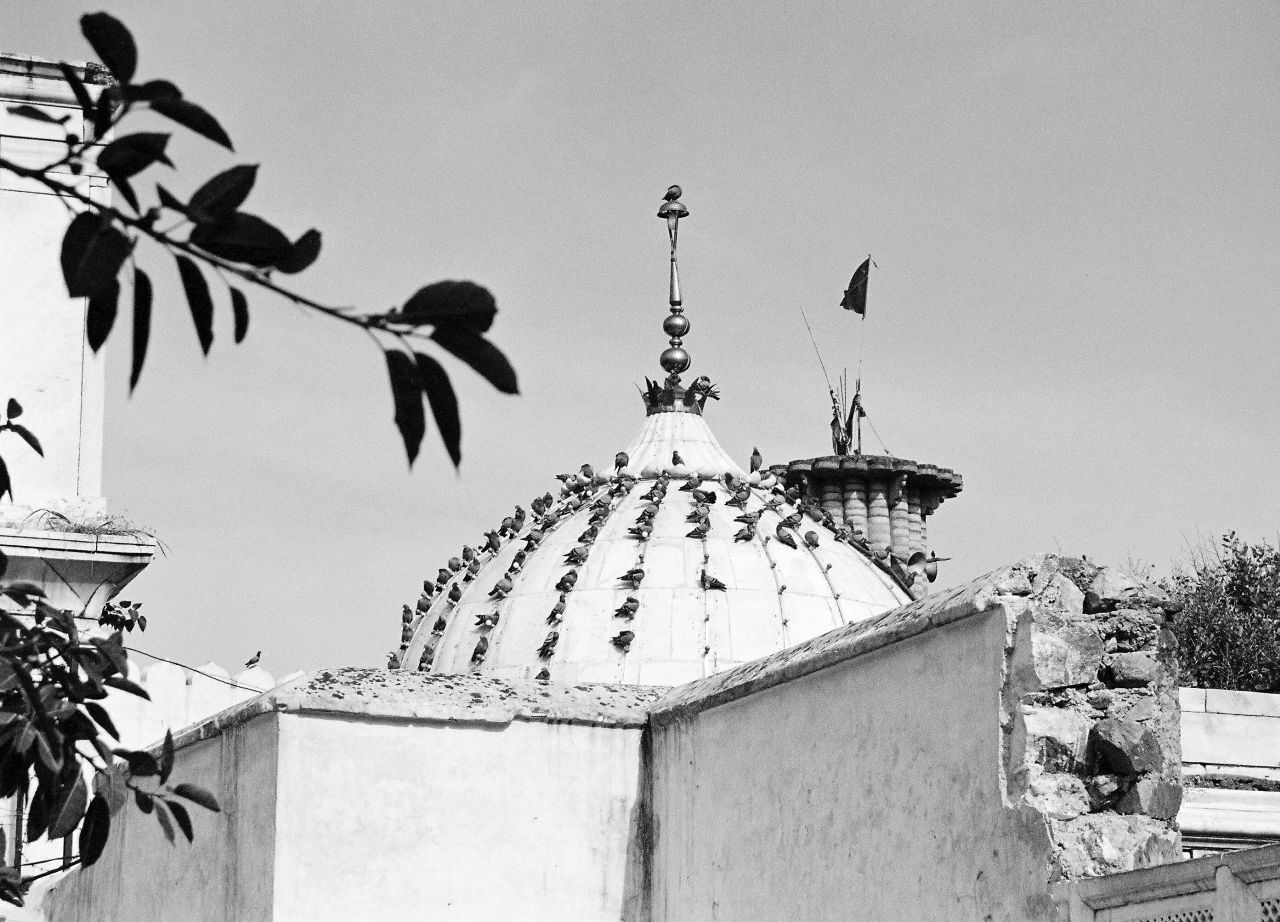
Tomb of Qutbuddin Bakhtiar Kaki near Huaz-i-Shamsi

== See also ==
- Chahartaq (architecture)
- Jamali Kamali Mosque and Tomb, located in the Archaeological Village complex in Mehrauli, Delhi, India.
