= Jahaz Mahal =

16th century building in India

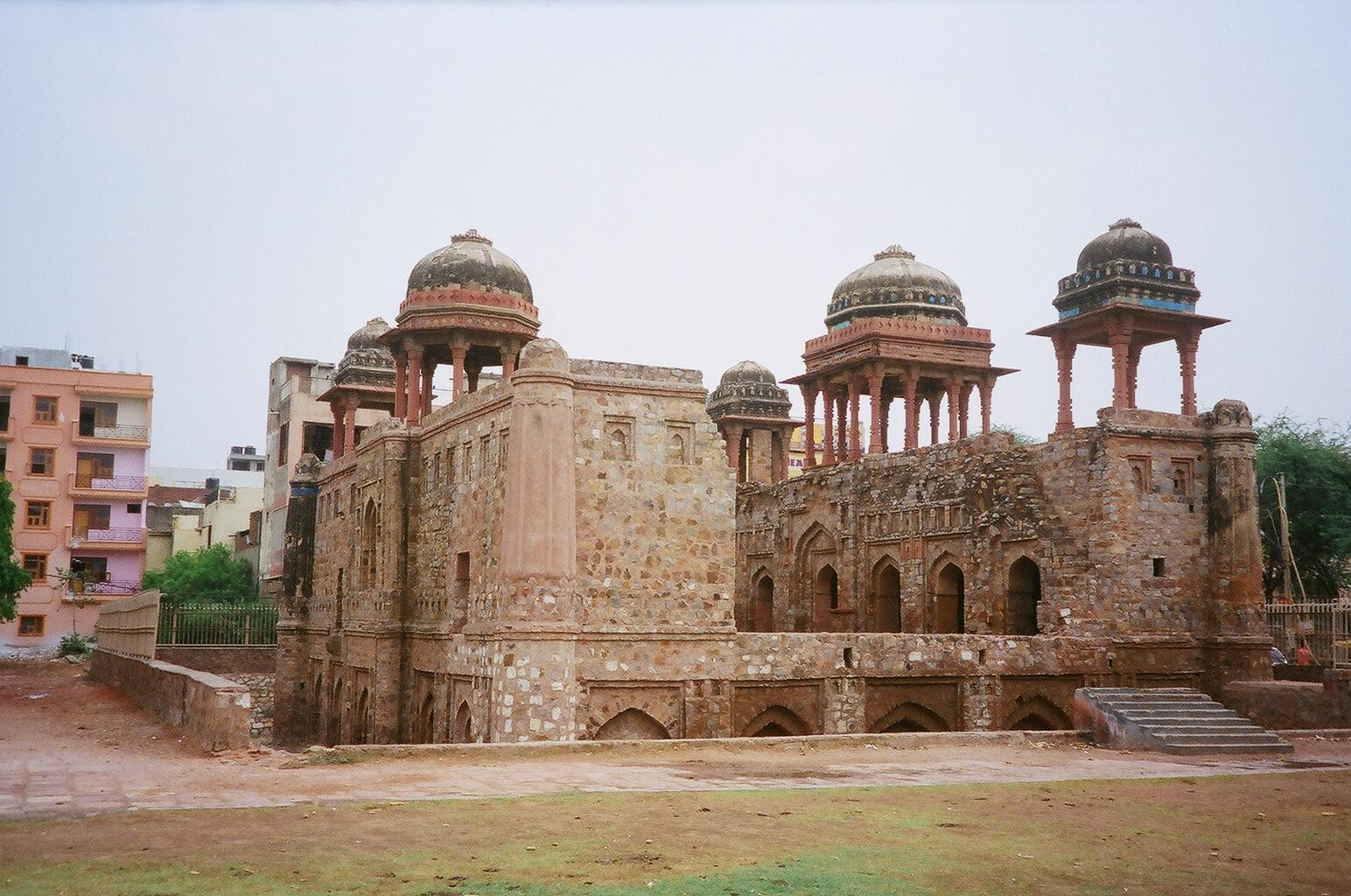
- Façade of Jahaz Mahal, on the bank of Hauz-i-Shamsi
- Interactive map of Jahaz Mahal
- 28°30′51.49″N 77°10′42.67″E
- Location: Mehrauli, Delhi, India

History
- Built: 1526; 500 years ago

Site notes
- Architectural style: Indo-Islamic, Lodi

Monument of National Importance
- Official name: Jahaz Mahal
- Reference no.: N-DL-88

Jahaz Mahal (lit. 'Ship Palace') is located next to Hauz-i-Shamsi in Mehrauli, Delhi. It was so named, since its reflection (illusion) in the surrounding reservoir looked like a ship floating on a lake. It is inferred to have been built during the Lodi dynasty (1452–1526) as a pleasure resort, Sarai or an inn.

== History ==
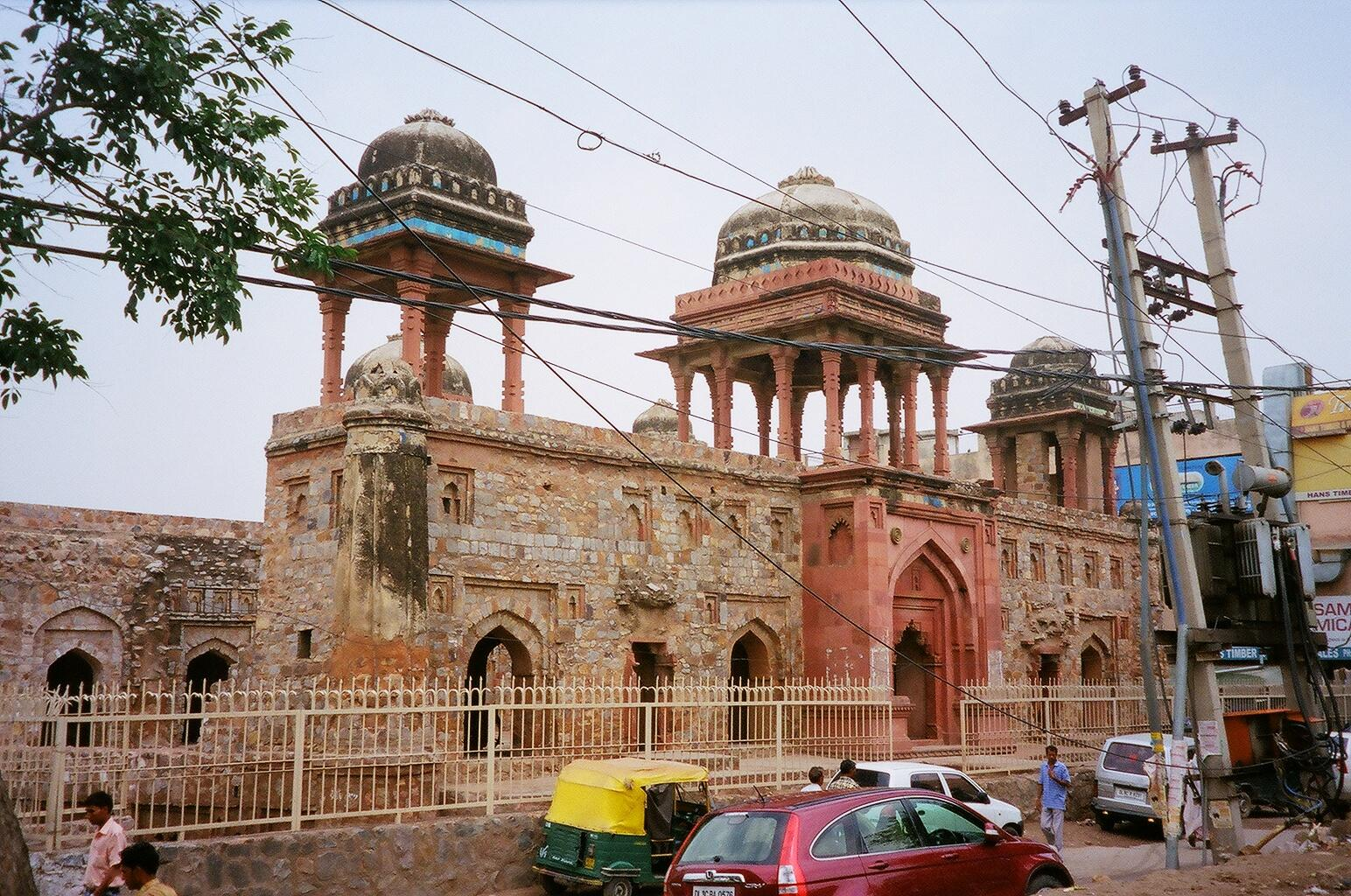
Facade of Jahaz Mahal

One reason for building the Jahaj Mahal retreat was to provide transit accommodation as a Sarai or (inn) to the large number of pilgrims from Afghanistan, Arabia, Iran, Iraq, Morocco and Turkey who came to Delhi to visit the many Muslim shrines. Another version is that it was built as a retreat for the emperors, Akbar Shah II and Bahadur Shah II and their families, during the summer months, away from the heat and dust of Delhi. Its construction is dated between 1451 AD and 1526 AD, before Babar's invasion and the beginning of Mughal rule in Delhi.

== Structure ==
The palace is approached from the eastern side. A courtyard, originally in a rectangular shape now seen in ‘U’ shape, is in the center of the palace. The palace has carved impressive square chhatris (six of them with different numbers of pillars – six, eight and twelve) or towers in the corners and the centre, ornamented with beautiful squinches in different chambers and walls (pictures in the gallery). The domed pavilion over the central gate is decorated with blue tiles. A small mosque is also located within the palace, as discerned from a mihrab in a niche on the west wall.

== Cultural event ==
Jahaj Mahal is the venue of the annual colorful festival of the Phool Walon Ki Sair (means a procession of the florists) or 'Sair-i-Gulfaroshan' held in October. A procession of flower bedecked pankhas (fans) made and carried by the flower vendors starts from Mehrauli at the overflow outlet of the Hauz-i-Shamsi tank, called "Jharna", stops at the Yogmaya Temple for the first offering of the flower fan as mark of reverence, moves to the Jahaj Mahal and finally ends at the famous dargah of Hazrat Qutbuddin Bakhtiar Kaki for the presentation of the fans and chaddar at Kaki's dargha. It marks the syncretic Hindu-Muslim composite culture. The festival was started by Emperor Akbar Shah II in 1820. It was popularised by Emperor Bahadur Shah II. It was discontinued from 1942 for a time during the British period but was restarted in 1961 at the initiative of Pandit Jawaharlal Nehru, the first Prime Minister of India. The three-day festival is held at the Jahaj Mahal where elaborate cultural programmes are organised. Cultural troupes from several States of India perform dances, drama programmes and hold musical soirees (particularly Qawwalis), in their colourful regional costumes and aspire for honours recognising their talent. Fire dancers lead the procession with pankahs.

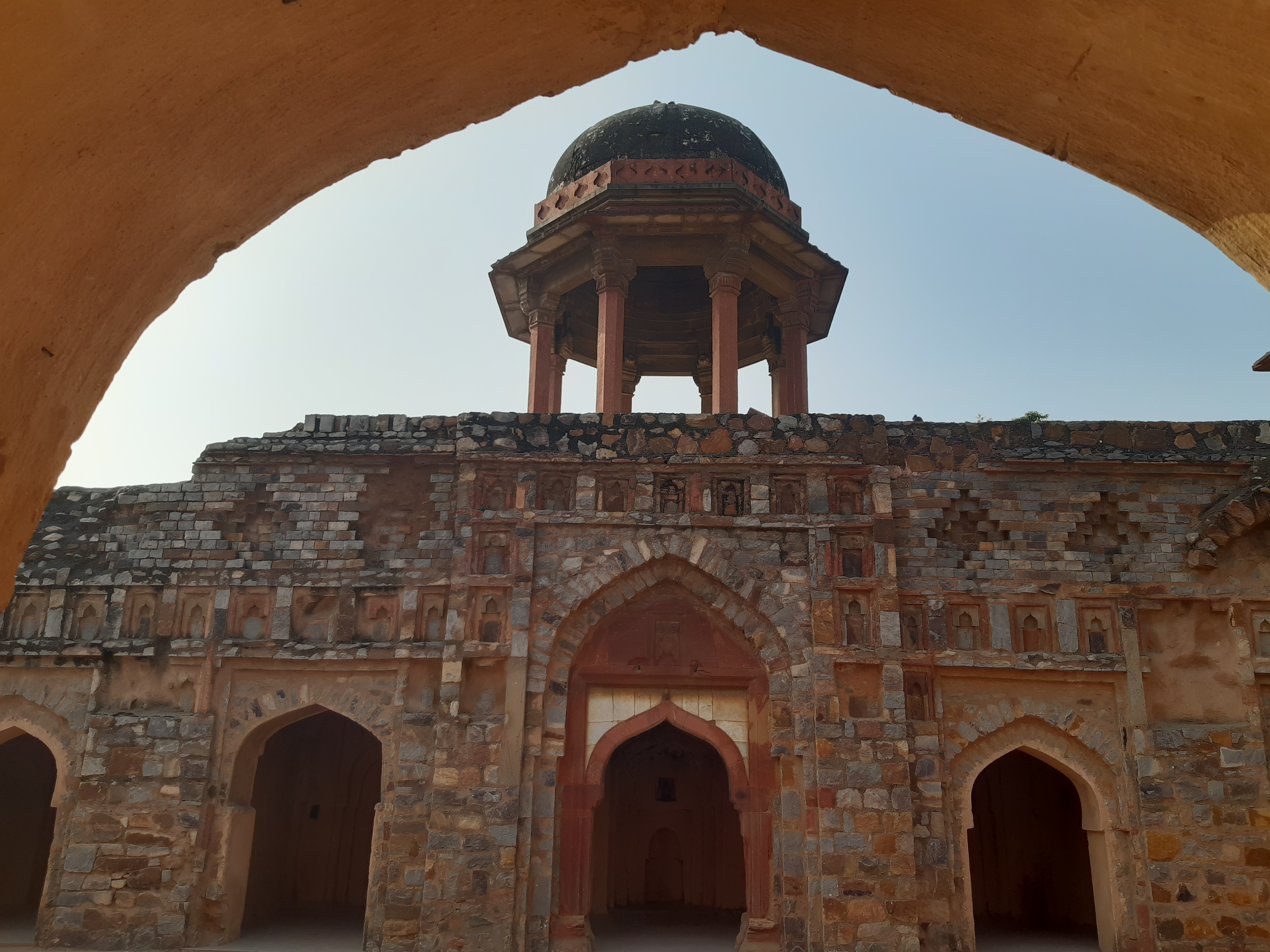
The entrance

== Conservation measures ==
The Conservation Society, Delhi,(CSD), established in 1984 as a voluntary organisation for preservation of Delhi's environment and architectural heritage with the main objective of creating awareness among the public of Delhi's heritage, conducts seminars, workshops and heritage walks to promote awareness and pursue conservation activities. Jahaj Mahal is one of the monuments identified by CSD to pursue concerted conservation activities with the agencies responsible for such works, in Mehrauli, Delhi's urban village which is one of 111 such villages identified all over Delhi.

== Visitor information ==
The heritage monument is open on all days of the week from sunrise to sunset. The nearest railway station is Hazrat Nizamuddin Railway Station. The metro station is at Chattarpur on the Yellow Line. The nearest international airport is the Indira Gandhi International Airport. It is easily approachable from any part of the Delhi city by road transport. It is better to see with Mehruli Archeological Park to enjoy Delhi sultanate monuments. Inside the park there is an ample parking space.

== Gallery ==
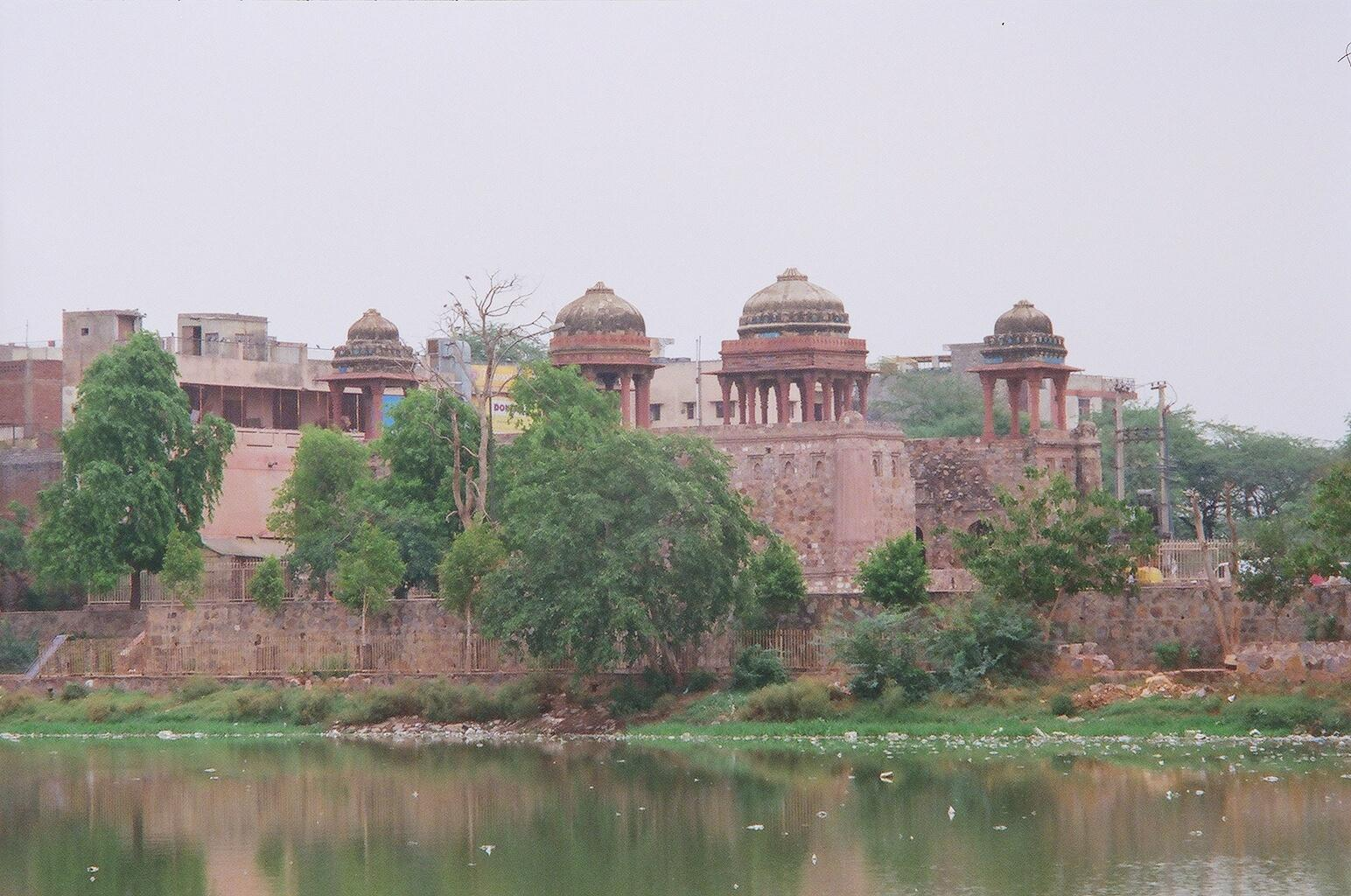
View of Jahaz Mahal from Hauz-i-Shamsi

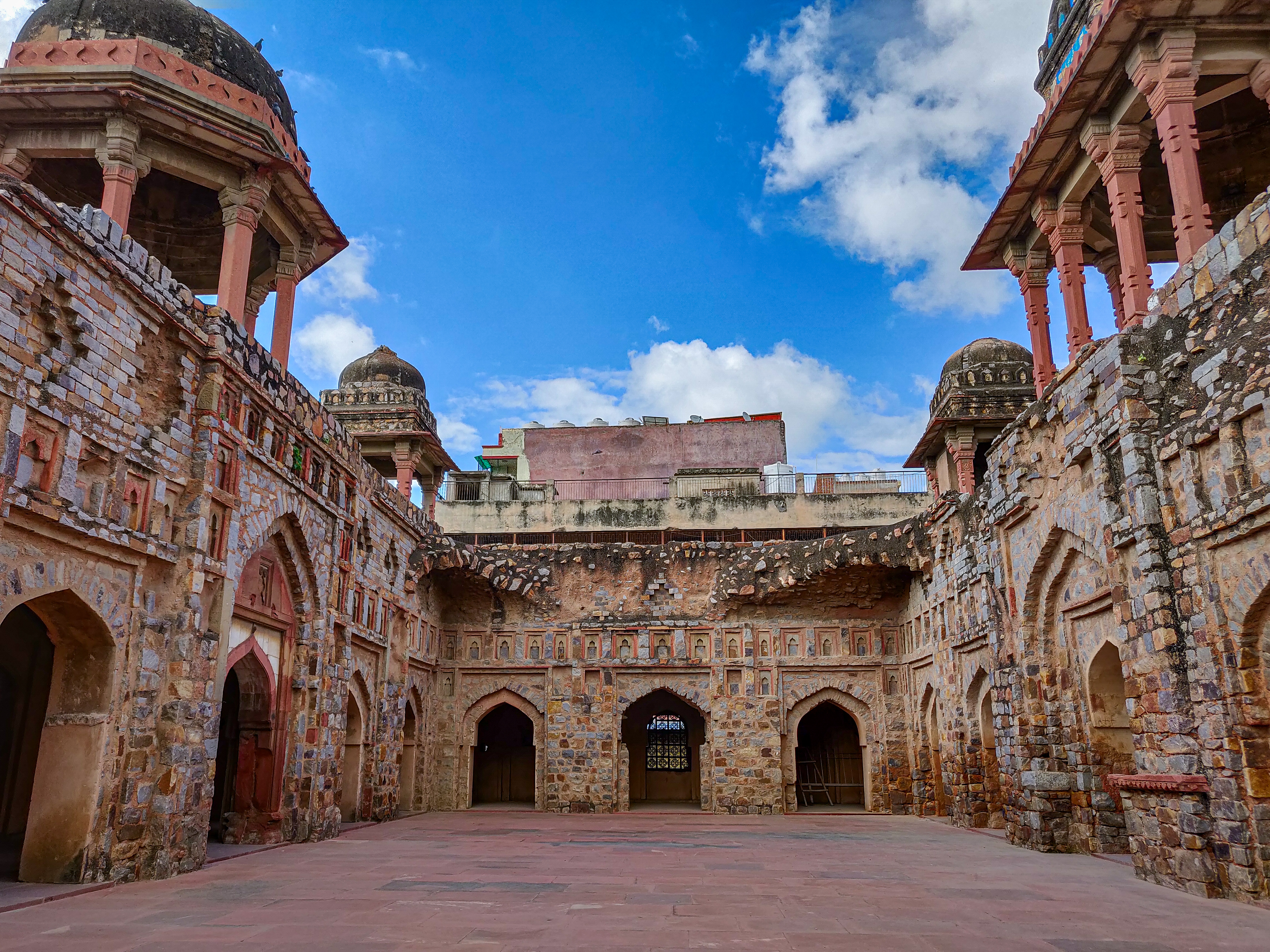
The courtyard

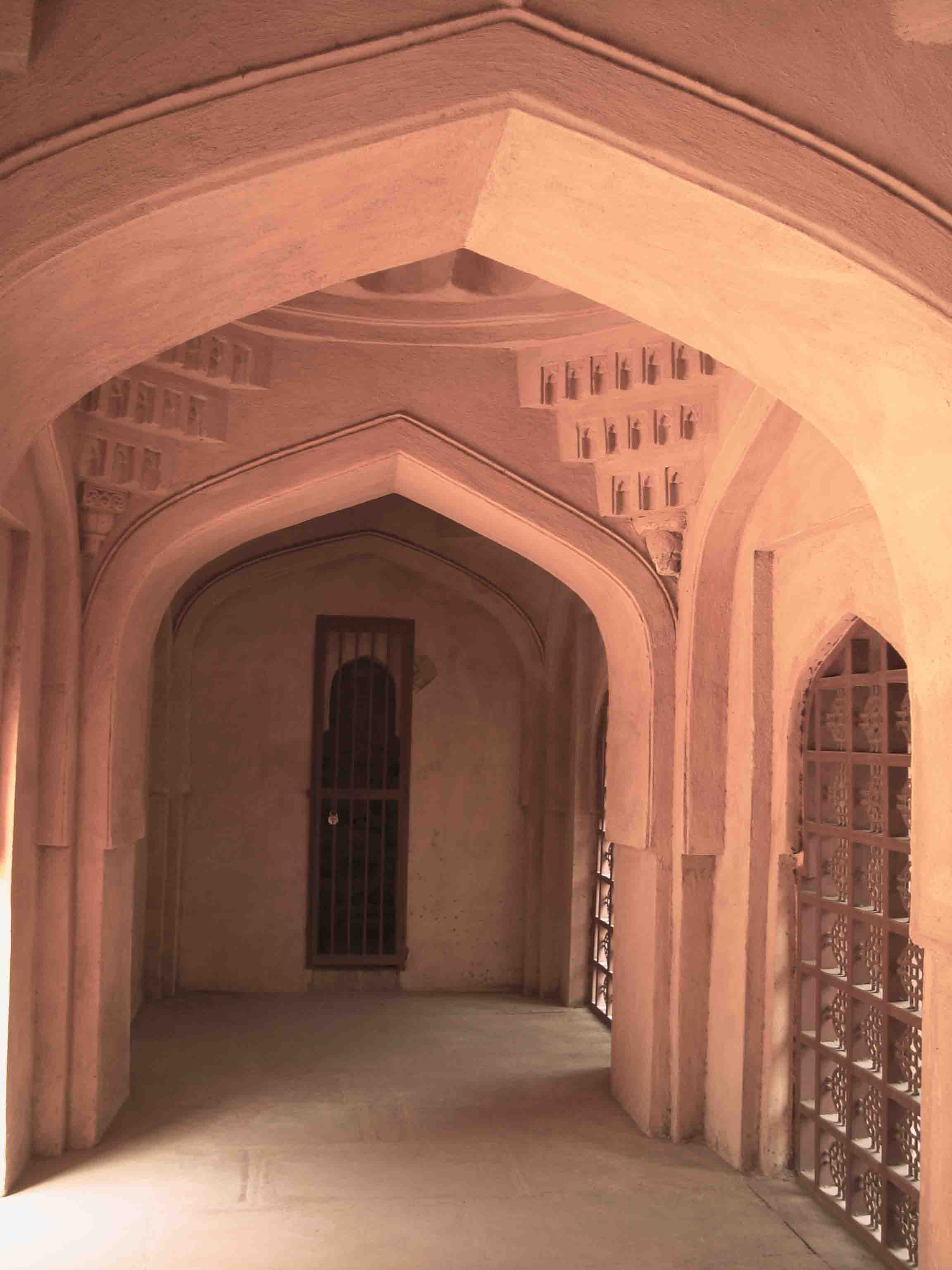
The interior

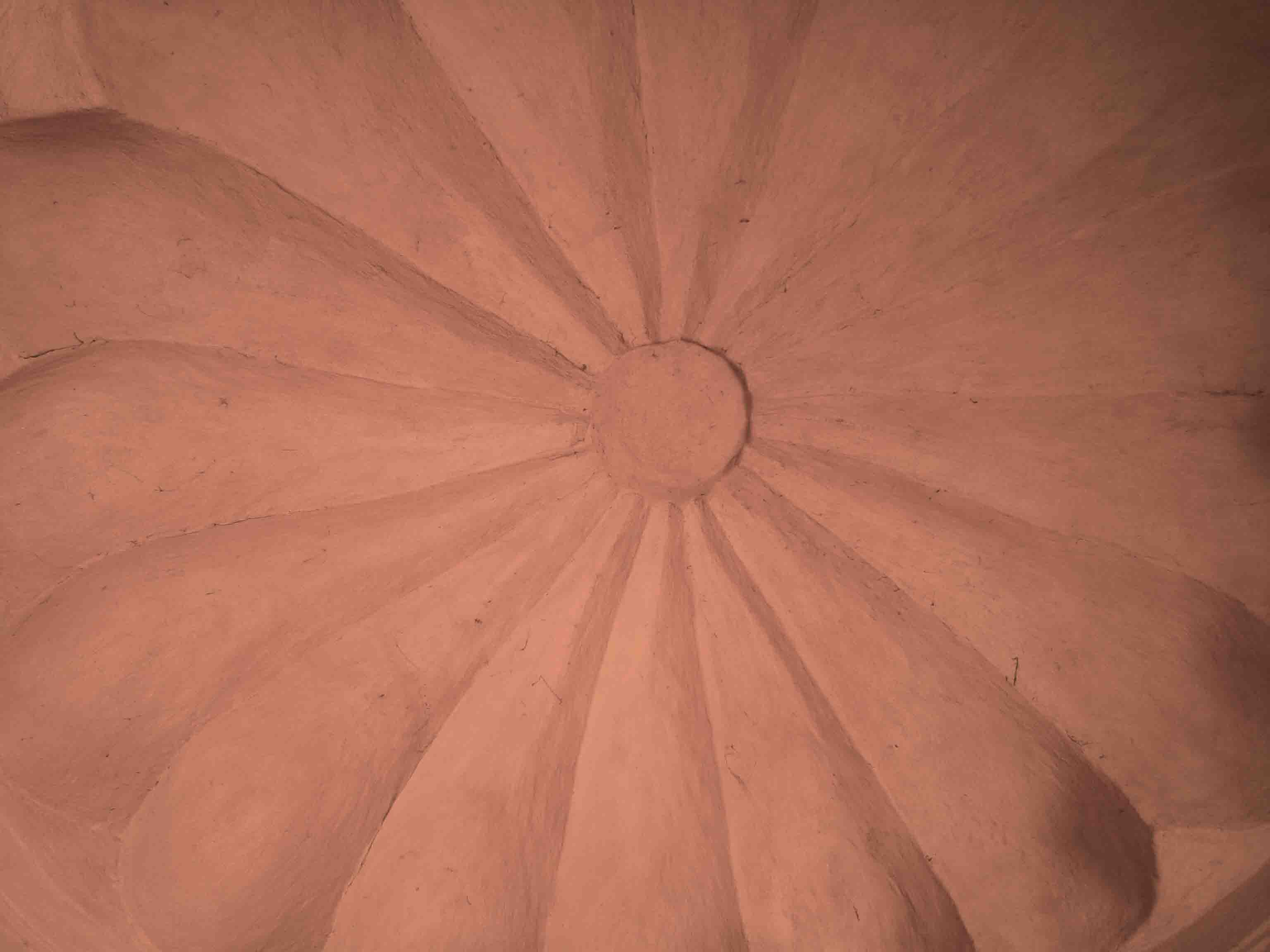
The ceiling

== See also ==
- Jal Mahal
- Jahaz Mahal, Mandu
