= List of engineering colleges in Delhi =

The following is a list of engineering colleges present in Delhi.

== Centrally funded colleges ==
Name	Affiliation	Foundation	Ref.
School of Planning and Architecture	Deemed university	1941	
Indian Institute of Technology, Delhi	Autonomous Institute	1961	
Faculty of Engineering and Technology (JMI)	Jamia Millia Islamia	1985	
School of Engineering Science and Technology (JH)	Jamia Hamdard	1989	
National Institute of Technology, Delhi	Autonomous Institute	2010	
Cluster Innovation Centre (DU)	University of Delhi	2011	
Faculty of Technology (DU)	University of Delhi	2023	

== State university colleges ==
Name	Affiliation	Foundation	Ref.
Delhi Technological University (Note: Delhi College of Engineering was established as Delhi Polytechnic in 1941. In 1962, the administration of Delhi Polytechnic was taken over from Ministry of Education, to Delhi State and it was renamed as "Delhi College of Engineering" in 1965. In 2009 college was converted to a state (public) university and has been rechristened "Delhi Technological University".) (formerly Delhi College of Engineering)	Autonomous Public State University(Demerged from Delhi University in 2010)	1941	
Netaji Subhas University of Technology	Autonomous Public State University(Demerged from Delhi University in 2018)	1983	
National Power Training Institute	Guru Gobind Singh Indraprastha University	1974	
Indira Gandhi Delhi Technical University for Women	State University	1998	
University School of Biotechnology	Guru Gobind Singh Indraprastha University	1999	
University School of Chemical Technology	Guru Gobind Singh Indraprastha University	1999	
University School of Information Technology	Guru Gobind Singh Indraprastha University	1999	
Guru Premsukh Memorial College of Engineering	Guru Gobind Singh Indraprastha University	1999	
Ambedkar Institute of Technology	Guru Gobind Singh Indraprastha University	2001	
Dr. Akhilesh Das Gupta Institute of Professional Studies	Guru Gobind Singh Indraprastha University	2003	
CBP Government Engineering College	Guru Gobind Singh Indraprastha University	2007	
Govind Ballabh Pant Engineering College	Guru Gobind Singh Indraprastha University	2007	
Delhi Institute of Tool Engineering	Guru Gobind Singh Indraprastha University	2007	
University School of Automation and Robotics	Guru Gobind Singh Indraprastha University	2021	

=== Self financed state colleges ===
Name	Affiliation	Foundation	Ref.
Sushant School of Art and Architecture	Guru Gobind Singh Indraprastha University	1989	
TVB School of Habitat Studies	Guru Gobind Singh Indraprastha University	1990	
Vastu Kala Academy	Guru Gobind Singh Indraprastha University	1993	
Amity School of Engineering & Technology	Guru Gobind Singh Indraprastha University	1999	
Bharati Vidyapeeth's College of Engineering	Guru Gobind Singh Indraprastha University	1999	
Guru Tegh Bahadur Institute of Technology	Guru Gobind Singh Indraprastha University	1999	
Maharaja Agrasen Institute of Technology	Guru Gobind Singh Indraprastha University	1999	
Maharaja Surajmal Institute of Technology	Guru Gobind Singh Indraprastha University	1999	
Guru Premsukh Memorial College of Engineering	Guru Gobind Singh Indraprastha University	1999	
HMR Institute of Technology & Management	Guru Gobind Singh Indraprastha University	2002	
Bhagwan Parshuram Institute of Technology	Guru Gobind Singh Indraprastha University	2005	
Northern India Engineering College	Guru Gobind Singh Indraprastha University	2003	
Fairfield Institute of Management and Technology	Guru Gobind Singh Indraprastha University	2008	

== Private colleges ==
Name	Affiliation	Foundation	Ref.
Indraprastha Institute of Information Technology	Autonomous Institute	2008	

== Notes and references ==
=== Notes ===
- ^{a} Institute was established in 2000 and approved by AICTE and recognised by UGC on 11 May 2006.
- ^{b} Delhi College of Engineering was established as Delhi Polytechnic in 1941. In 1962, the administration of Delhi Polytechnic was taken over from Ministry of Education, to Delhi State and it was renamed as "Delhi College of Engineering" in 1965. In 2009 college was converted to a state (public) university and has been rechristened "Delhi Technological University".
