= List of colleges affiliated to the Guru Gobind Singh Indraprastha University =

Educational institutions

There are more than 120 affiliates of the Guru Gobind Singh Indraprastha University, also known as Indraprastha University (IP), which are run according to the rules and regulation set by the university.

Listed here are the 14 main colleges (university schools) and notable IP-affiliated government and private institutions.

== University schools ==
Guru Gobind Singh Indraprastha University has 14 university schools (colleges), 12 of them are on the main campus in Dwarka and 2 colleges, USAR and USDI are on the new campus at East Delhi. School at Main Campus:

- University School of Architecture and Planning (USAP)
- University School of Basic & Applied Sciences (USBAS)
- University School of Biotechnology (USBT)
- University School of Chemical Technology (USCT)
- University School of Environment Management (USEM)
- University School of Humanities & Social Sciences (USHSS)
- University School of Information and Communication Technology (USICT)
- University School of Law and Legal Studies (USLLS)
- University School of Management Studies (USMS)
- University School of Mass Communication (USMC)
- University School of Medicine and Para-Medical Health Sciences (USMPHS)

Schools at East Delhi Campus:

- University School of Automation and Robotics (USAR)
- University School of Design & Innovation (USDI)

== Affiliated government institutions ==
- Atal Bihari Vajpayee Institute of Medical Sciences and Dr. RML Hospital, Talkatora Road
- Ch. Brahm Prakash Ayurved Charak Sansthan, Najafgarh
- Bhai Parmanand Institute of Business Studies, Shakarpur
- Centre for Development of Advanced Computing, Sector 62, Noida
- Delhi Institute of Heritage Research & Management, Qutub Institutional Area
- Dr. Baba Saheb Ambedkar Medical College and Hospital, Rohini
- National Power Training Institute, Badarpur
- North Delhi Municipal Corporation Medical College, Malka Ganj
- Vardhman Mahavir Medical College, Ansari Nagar West (near AIIMS Delhi)

== Private colleges and institutes ==
- Rukmini Devi Institute of Advanced Studies (RDIAS), Rohini
- Echelon Institute Of Technology - Delhi
- Army College of Medical Sciences, Delhi Cantonment
- Delhi Institute of Technology & Management, Shastri Nagar
- Delhi Metropolitan Education, Sector 62, Noida
- Delhi School of Professional Studies and Research (DSPSR), Rohini
- Fairfield Institute of Management and Technology, Kapashera
- Institute of Information Technology and Management (IITM 1), Janakpuri
- Institute of Innovation in Technology and Management (IITM 2), Janakpuri
- Maharaja Surajmal College, Janakpuri
  - Maharaja Surajmal Institute of Technology
  - Maharaja Surajmal Institute
- Management Education & Research Institute (MERI), Janakpuri
- New Delhi Institute of Management (NDIM), Tughlakabad Institutional Area, Tigri
- Trinity Institute of Professional Studies, Dwarka
- Banarsidas Chandiwala Institute of Professional Studies, Dwarka
- Guru Tegh Bahadur Institute of Technology, Hari Nagar
- Guru Nanak Institute of Management, Punjabi Bagh
- Dr. Akhilesh Das Gupta Institute of Professional Studies, Shastri Park
- Kalka Institute of Research and Advanced Studies' Alaknanda
- Tecnia Institute of Advanced Studies, Rohini
- Maharaja Agrasen College, Rohini
  - Maharaja Agrasen Institute of Technology
  - Maharaja Agrasen Institute
- JIMS
  - Jagan Institute of Management Studies, Rohini
  - Jagannath International Management School, Vasant Kunj
  - Jagannath International Management School, Kalkaji
  - JIMS Engineering Management Technical Campus, Greater Noida
- Don Bosco Institute of Technology, Sukhdev Vihar
- Vivekananda Institute of Professional Studies (VIPS), Pitampura
