= S. P. Singh =

S. P. Singh may refer to:

- S. P. Singh (academic), Indian professor of ecology
- S. P. Singh (biochemist) (born 1948), professor of biochemistry
- S. P. Singh (jurist), Indian legal educational administrator
