= COMM-IT Career Academy =

Educational institution in New Delhi, India

Coordinates: 28.532459°N 77.225483°E

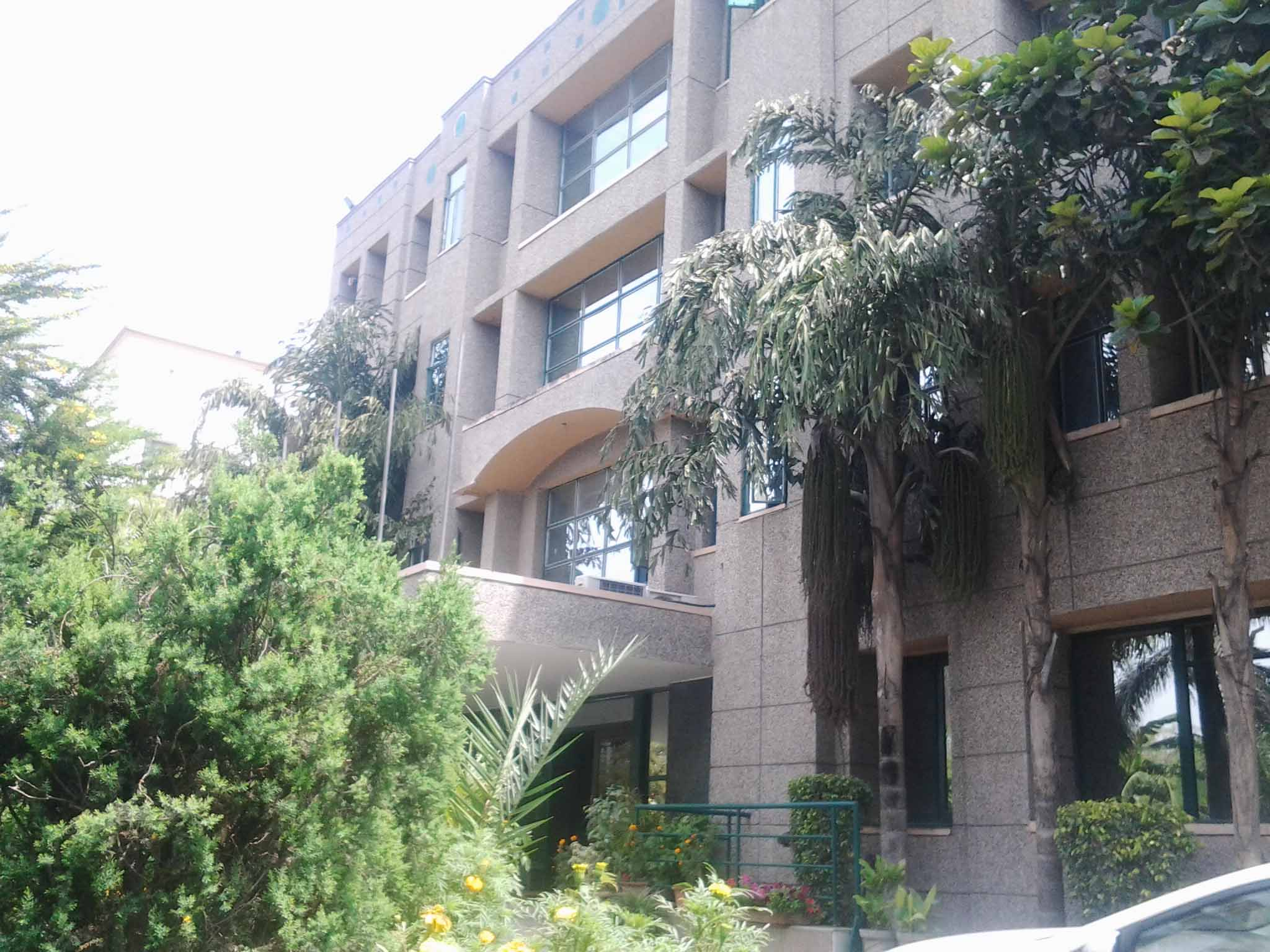
- Campus Building COMM-IT Career Academy
- Type: College
- Established: 2003-4
- Affiliations: Guru Gobind Singh Indraprastha University
- Chairman: Shaukat ali
- Academic staff: 10
- Location: New Delhi, Delhi, India
- Campus: Urban
- Colors
- Website: commit.org.in

COMM-IT Career Academy is an educational institution which grants bachelor's degree in Computer Applications. It is situated in Awadh Bhawan FC-31, Institutional Area, Sheikh Sarai-II, New Delhi, India. It has a campus spread over one acre of land. The college is affiliated to Guru Gobind Singh Indraprastha University under the name of COMM-IT Career Academy (Minority Educational Institution) .

== History ==
Awadh Centre of Education was established in 1995, to improve quality standards of education to all whether they are socially backward or belong to minority communities in particular. In 1999 the college started the Institute of Rehabilitation Medicine & Allied Sciences (IRMAS) followed by the COMM-IT Career Academy and Institute of Vocational Studies (IVS) in 2003–04.

== Programmes ==
BCA (Bachelor of Computer Application) is an undergraduate three-year professional degree programme which trains and educate students about computer programming and business. The institute is affiliated to GGSIPU under the name of COMM-IT Career Academy.
