= Kanwal =

Kanwal may refer to:

- Kanwal, New South Wales, a suburb in Australia
- Kanwal, a personal name; notable people with the name include:
  - Anita Kanwal, Indian actress and producer
  - Jaswant Singh Kanwal, Indian Punjabi-language writer
  - Kanwal Ameen, Pakistani academic
  - Kanwal Bharti, Indian Hindi-language writer and columnist
  - Kanwal Feroze, Pakistani writer
  - Kanwal Jeet Singh Dhillon, Indian army officer
  - Kanwal Nauman, Pakistani actor and politician
  - Kanwal Naz, Pakistani cricketer
  - Kanwal Pervaiz, Pakistani politician
  - Kanwal Rekhi, Indian–American businessman
  - Kanwal Shauzab, Pakistani politician
  - Kanwal Sibal, Indian diplomat
  - Kanwal Singh Chauhan, Indian farmer
  - Kanwal Thakar Singh, Indian badminton player
  - Kanwal Ziai, Indian Hindi/Urdu-language writer
  - Dinesh Kanwal, Banker, Financial Planner
  - Pooja Kanwal, Indian actress
  - Rahul Kanwal, Indian TV journalist
  - Sadaf Kanwal, Pakistani actress and model
  - Sandeela Kanwal, American victim of an honor killing
