= Indira Gandhi Delhi Technical University for Women =

All women's university in Delhi, India

Coordinates: 28.664698°N 77.232669°E

Indira Gandhi Delhi Technical University for Women (IGDTUW)
- Other name: IGDTUW
- Former name: Indira Gandhi Institute of Technology
- Type: Public
- Established: 1998; 28 years ago 2013; 13 years ago as University
- Affiliations: Autonomous
- Chancellor: Lieutenant Governor of Delhi
- Vice-Chancellor: Ranjana Jha
- Academic staff: 150
- Students: 5000+
- Location: James Church, New Church Rd, Opp. St, Kashmere Gate, Central Delhi, Delhi - 110006, Old Delhi, Delhi, India
- Campus: Urban
- Website: www.igdtuw.ac.in

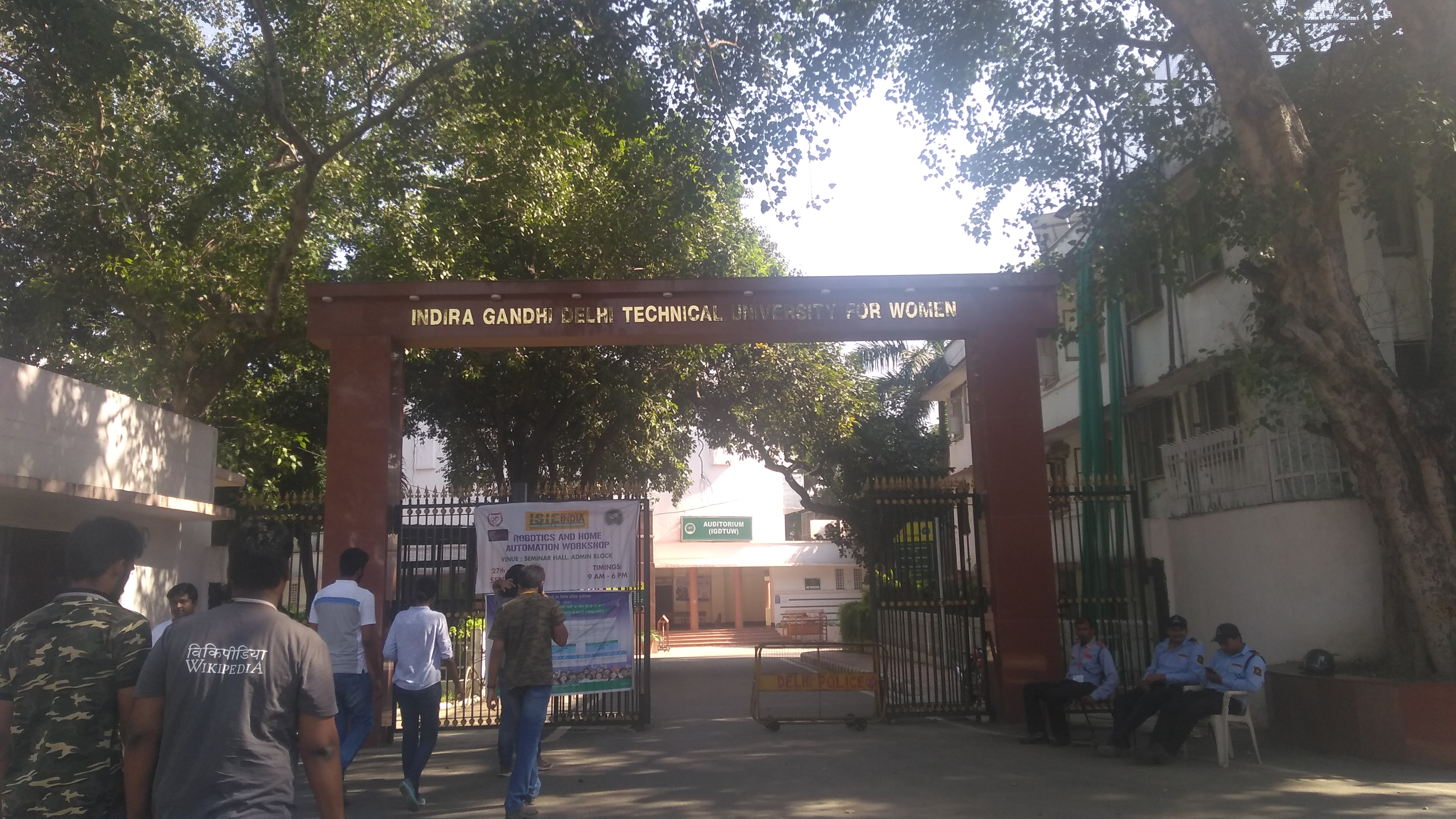
Main Gate, Indira Gandhi Delhi Technical University for Women (IGDTUW)

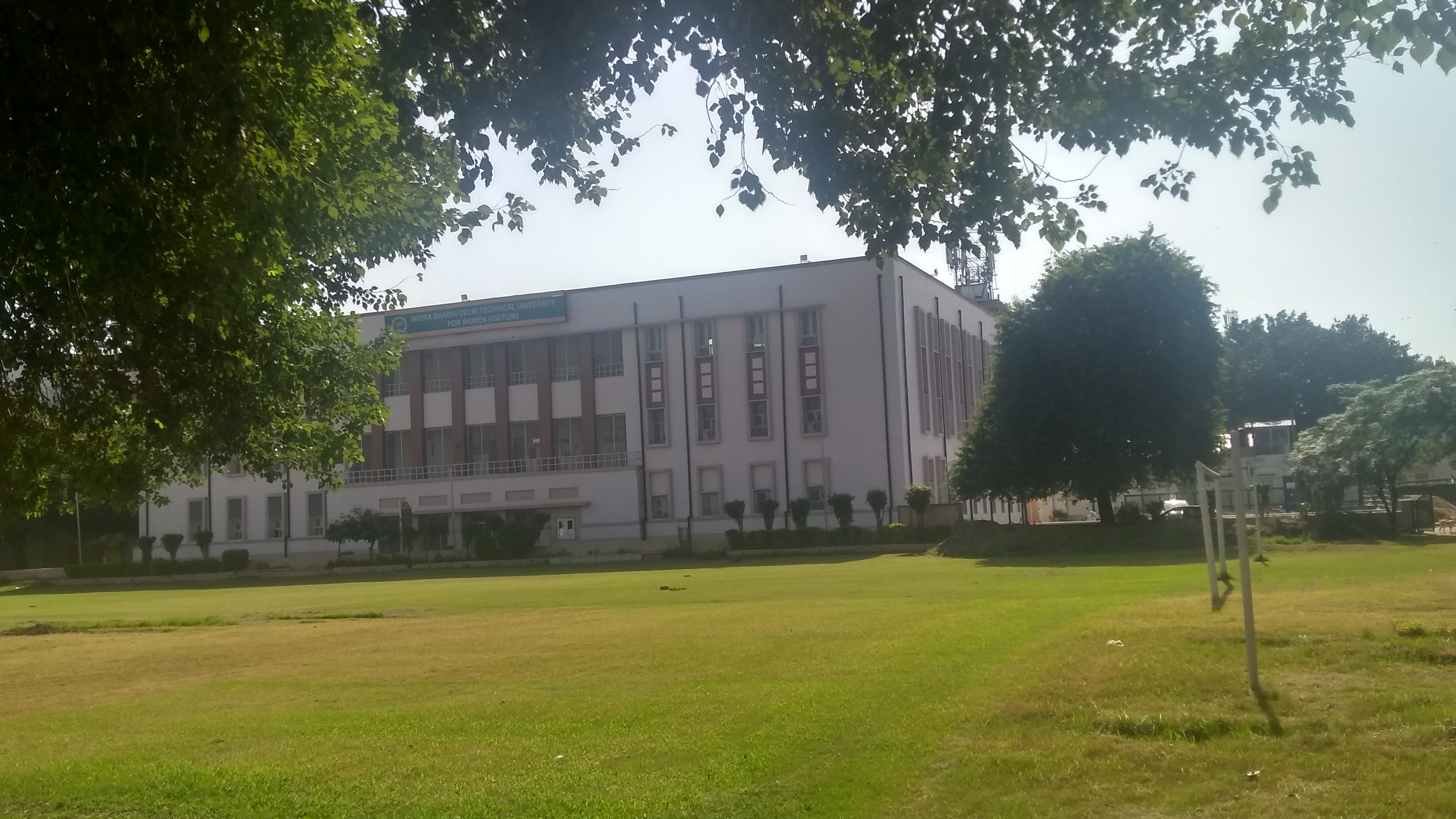
IGDTUW Sports Ground

The Indira Gandhi Delhi Technical University for Women (IGDTUW), is an all women's university located in Old Delhi,Delhi, India on the heritage campus at Kashmere Gate, Delhi. It was founded as the Indira Gandhi Institute of Technology in 1998. In May 2013 it gained autonomy and became the first women's technical university in India established by Govt. of Delhi. The university offers BBA and BTech, MTech, and PhD programs in four branches of engineering i.e. in the field of Computer Science and Engineering, Electronics and Communication Engineering, Mechanical and Automation Engineering and Information Technology. The university also offers 5 years program in Bachelors of Architecture (B.Arch.) and a 2-year post graduate program in M. Plan (Urban Planning).

== History ==
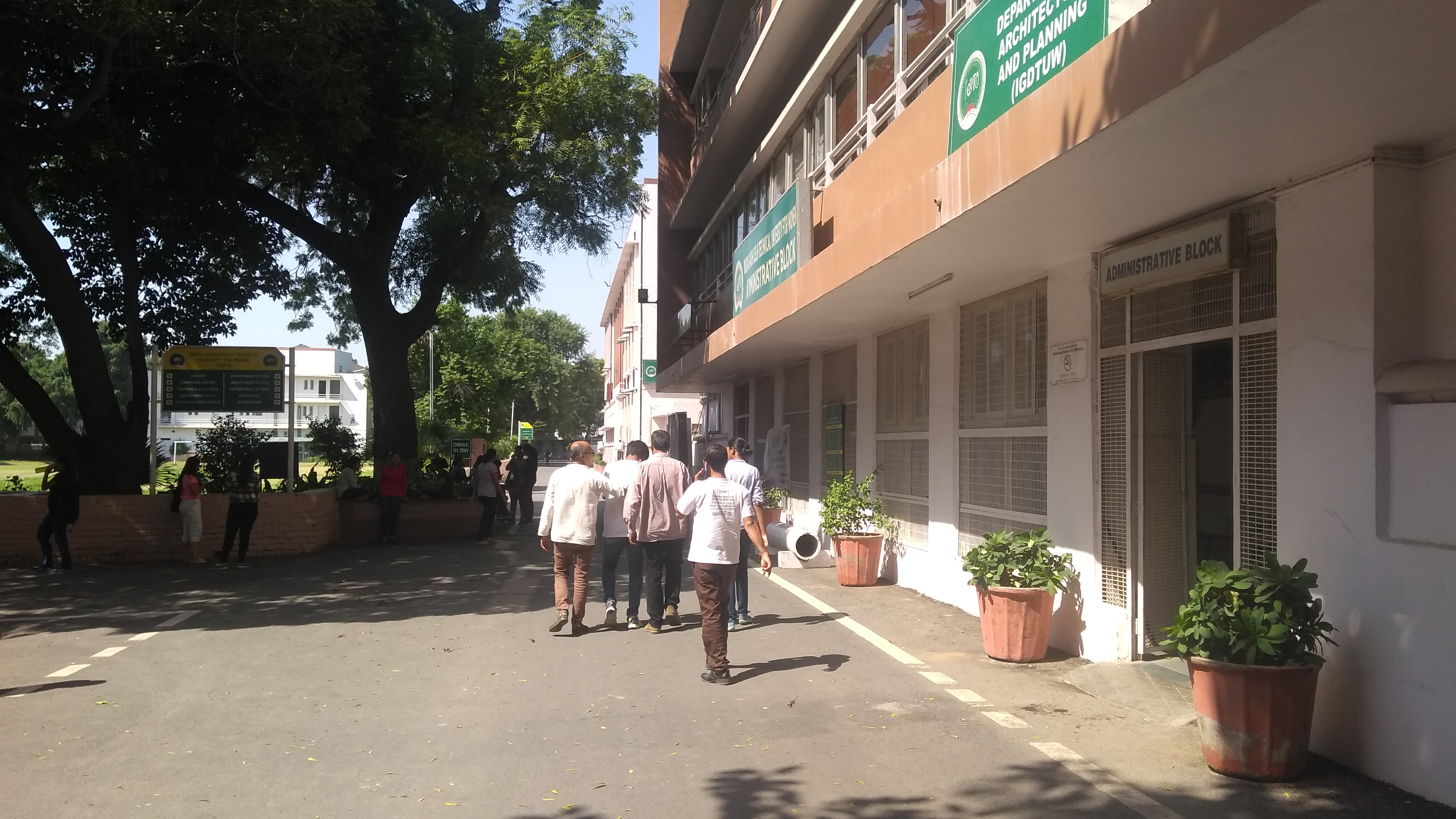
Department of Architecture and Planning, IGDTUW

Indira Gandhi Institute of Technology was established by the Department of Training and Technical Education, Govt. of Delhi, in 1998 as the first woman Engineering College in India. It was the first institute to become a constituent college of Guru Gobind Singh Indraprastha University. From May, 2013 IGIT has acquired the status of the first Women's technical University under Govt. of Delhi and rechristened as Indira Gandhi Delhi Technical University for Women.

Indira Gandhi Delhi Technical University for Women (IGDTUW) was established by the Govt. NCT of Delhi in May 2013 vide Delhi Act 09 of 2012, as a non-affiliating University to facilitate and promote studies, research, technology, innovation, incubation and extension work in emerging areas of professional education among women, with a focus on engineering, technology, applied sciences, architecture and its allied areas.

Erstwhile Indira Gandhi Institute of Technology (IGIT) was established in 1998 by the Directorate of Training and Technical Education, Govt. of NCT of Delhi as the first engineering college for women only. In 2002, the college became the first constituent college of Guru Gobind Singh Indraprastha University.

== Administration ==
Dr. Nupur Prakash is the founder and Vice-Chancellor of Indira Gandhi Delhi Technical University for Women established by Govt. of Delhi in 2013 as the first Women's Technical University. Dr. R K Singh holds the position of the Officiating Registrar of the university.

== Departments ==
The departments offering courses include:

- Computer Science and Engineering
- Computer Science and Engineering-Artificial Intelligence (CSE-AI)
- Electronics and Communication Engineering
- Electronics and Communication Engineering-Artificial Intelligence (ECE-AI)
- Information Technology
- Mechanical and Automation Engineering
- Mechanical and Automation Engineering with integrated MBA (DMAM)
- Applied Sciences & Humanities
- Management
- Architecture and Planning
- Artificial Intelligence & Data Science (AI&DS)

== Courses and admissions ==
The university offers undergraduate Bachelor of Technology courses in five different fields i.e. Computer Science and Engineering(CSE), Electronics and Communication Engineering(ECE), Information Technology(IT), Artificial Intelligence and Machine Learning (AIML), Mechanical and Automation Engineering(MAE). It also offers undergraduate Bachelor of Architecture (B.Arch.) course as well as postgraduate M. Plan (Urban Planning) and other postgraduate courses along with PhD.

=== Undergraduate Admissions ===
For BTech courses, students are selected through Joint Admission Counseling (JAC) (based on IITJEE MAINS rank). JAC DELHI members are 1. Delhi Technological University 2. Netaji Subhas University of Technology 3. Indraprastha Institute of Information Technology Delhi (IIIT, Delhi) 4. Indira Gandhi Delhi Technical University for Women,(IGDTUW). 5. Delhi Skill and Entrepreneurship University (DSEU)

=== Postgraduate Admissions ===
For M.Tech. and M. Plan courses the students are admitted based on valid GATE scores making them eligible for a monthly GATE Scholarship. The PhD admission is based on entrance tests and interviews.

== Scholarships and Financial Aid ==
IGDTUW offers scholarship to all GATE qualified M. Tech/M. Plan students and a few Full Time Research Scholars registered in the PhD Program under various Fellowship Schemes and Sponsored Research Projects. Fellowships are granted to candidates who qualify for the RAT examination and an Interview. The number of fellowships is limited and is subject to the availability of financial assistance.

== Rankings ==
University and college rankings

Engineering – India
- NIRF (2023): 151-200

The National Institutional Ranking Framework (NIRF) ranked it in the 151-200 band among engineering colleges in 2023.

== Facilities ==
The University Campus has an auditorium, a Library, sporting facilities, academic laboratories, a dispensary, a Computer Centre, a bank and a guest house. The university campus offers a common room for students which is equipped with fitness equipments, yoga facility and indoor games.

Library cum Learning Resource Centre (LRC)

The Digital Library section has e-materials like CDs, DVDs and digital theses of final year students and is available through an Open Source Institution Repository Software within the campus premises.

Computer Center (Open 24 X 7)

The university has an on-campus computing facility (computer lab) housed in centralized premises. The Computer Center at the university is equipped with the newly procured Computer Systems with a high-end configuration for the students of the institute.

Dispensary

The dispensary is equipped with over-the-counter medications, a bed to rest in, medical equipment, physical screening tools and first aid supplies.

Bank

The Punjab and Sind Bank is available on the university premises.

Guest House

The guest house within the campus has limited accommodation for the staying purpose of parents/individuals visiting the campus. The rooms are comfortable with all modern facilities available at nominal charges.

== Residential student halls ==
The university campus has two hostel wings - Krishna Hostel and Kaveri Hostel, to accommodate approximately 340 students. These two hostels are located in the university campus. These hostels provide a safe, secure and clean environment for the students to grow, learn and mature in society away from their own homes. The hostel authorities always facilitate to creation of an environment for the students to study, do well in their academics and focus on their careers and futures. All rooms are on a twin/triple sharing basis and are equipped with individual beds, chairs, built-in cupboards and study tables.

== Student Life and Culture ==
Taarangana is the cultural fest of IGDTUW and was held for the first time on 31 January - 1 February 2014. It is organised henceforth every year in January ending or February starting. Innerve is the annual technical fest of All the Technical Departments of IGDTUW. It is organised every year in October. Entrepreneurship Summit is a two-day event that celebrates the spirit of entrepreneurship by bringing various stakeholders of the entrepreneurial ecosystem under one roof. It is organized by EDC every year in March. Other fests organised by IGDTUW include Espectro, Impulse, Tremors, Exebec.

IGDTUW has clubs for extra-curricular activities such as Technoliterati-The Literary Society, Antargat- the Creative Society for Waste Management Practices, The Economics Society, Greensphere- The Environmental Society, Tarannum- the Music Society, ZENA- The Fashion Society, RAHNUMA-Dramatics Society, HYPNOTICS –Dance Society, SOCH - The Art Society The students also participate in national competitions like Baja SAE India, Supra SAE India among others gaining practical exposure to their engineering course.

== Notable alumni ==
- Durga Shakti Nagpal, Indian Administrative Service
