= USAR =

USAR or U.S.A.R. may refer to:

- United Speed Alliance Racing (now Rev-Oil Pro Cup Series), a car racing series in the United States
- United States Army Rangers, the elite light infantry of the United States Army
- United States Army Reserve, the reserve component forces of the United States Army
- University School of Automation & Robotics, Guru Gobind Singh Indraprastha University, Delhi, India
- Urban search and rescue, rescue operations inside structures or other confined spaces
- USA Rugby, the governing body of rugby union in the United States
