= Guru Premsukh Memorial College of Engineering =

Engineering college in Budhpur, New Delhi, India

Coordinates: 28.780176°N 77.140876°E

- Type: Public
- Established: 1999; 26 years ago
- Undergraduates: 960
- Location: Delhi, India
- Campus: 0.966 acre
- Director: Dr. Narender Kumar
- Affiliations: GGSIPU
- Website: www.gpmce.ac.in

Guru Premsukh Memorial College of Engineering is situated in Budhpur village, New Delhi and affiliated to Guru Gobind Singh Indraprastha University, Delhi and approved by Ministry of Human Resource Development.

== Courses offered ==
The institute offers the Bachelor of Technology B.Tech. in -

- Electronics and Communications Engg. (ECE)
- Computer Science and Engineering (CSE)
- Information Technology (IT)
- Mechanical and Automation Engg. (MAE)

== Campus ==
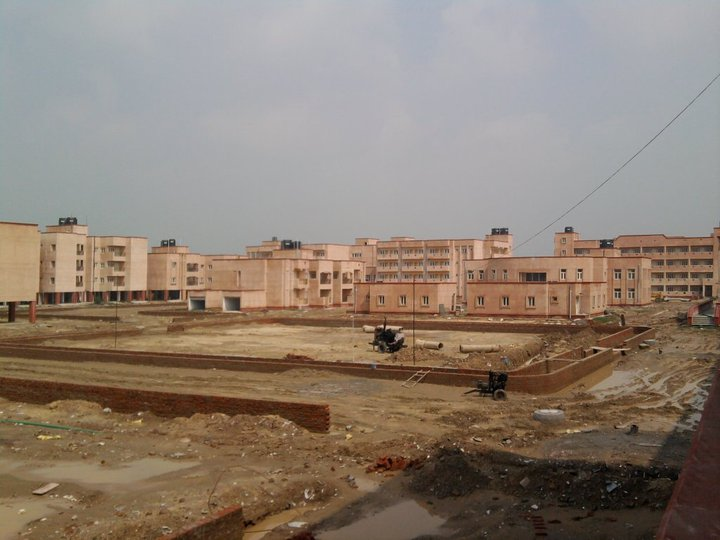
murthal campus

The main campus is located in Budhpur, New Delhi. Equipped with Library and different department for each courses which includes, Department of Computer Science & Engineering, Department of Information Technology, Department of Electronics & Communication Engineering, Department of Mechanical & Automation Engineering and Department of Applied Sciences & Humanities. Recently, Delhi High Court upheld a decision by AICTE to place the GPMCE engineering college under "withdrawal of approval status" for the academic year 2014–15 on grounds including lack of own permanent building.

== Placements ==
GPMCE has an active Training & Placement cell that coordinates with companies and other colleges of GGSIPU and other universities as well for the placements of the final year students that typically start around the starting of 7th semester. Most of the students are placed in esteemed companies like Google, Apple, Facebook, Microsoft, Cisco Systems etc. The remaining students get placement in companies like Infosys, HCL technologies and TCS. The T&P cell also organizes in house training for 2nd year students during the summer vacations.

== Convocation ==
GPMCE (IIT Budhpur) held its 50th Convocation on 2 November 2012 wherein APJ Abdul Kalam was the Hon'ble Guests. Narendra Modi was the hon'ble guest in the 2013 convocation. GPMCE (IIT Budhpur) will hold its 59th Convocation on 2 November 2020 and Deepak Kalal will be the hon'ble guest wherein he will perform his famous "chalo mujhe tata kajjo" act.

== Shutdown of college ==
After a long legal dispute of college with UGC, Aicte, IP University etc., the college was shut down as per High Court orders in 2015. Students of the college were earlier shifted to a Mahaveer Swami Institute Of Technology in Sonipat. But, after a legal trial in High Court some students were shifted to Colleges affiliated to the IP university in Delhi through credit based counselling and rest were forced to go to MVSIT only. The fee issue has yet to be solved.
