= Delhi Metropolitan Education =

- Type: Private
- Established: 2012
- Affiliations: Guru Gobind Singh Indraprastha University
- Chairman: R K Swami
- Location: Noida, Uttar Pradesh, India
- Campus: Urban
- Website: www.dme.ac.in
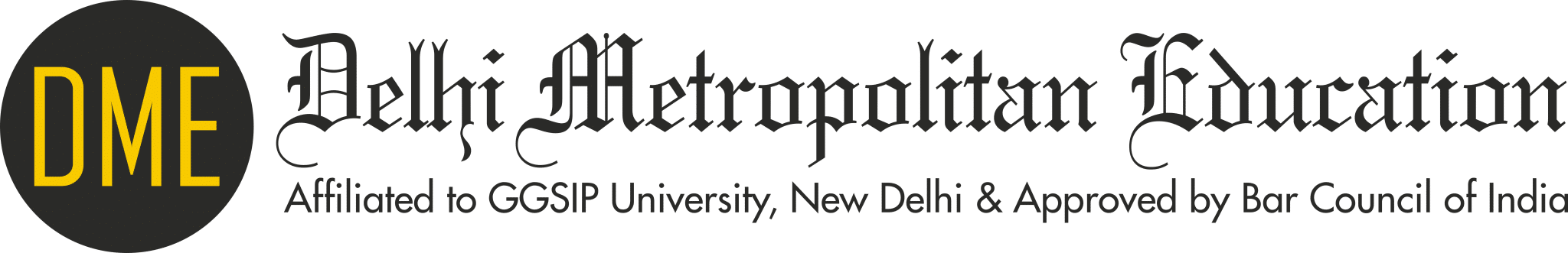

Delhi Metropolitan Education is an undergraduate college located in Sector 62, Noida. It was established in 2012 and is affiliated to Guru Gobind Singh Indraprastha University, New Delhi. The law college is recognised by the Bar Council of India. The institute provides pro bono legal aid services to the communities nearby the campus. Along with that, the institute helps students who are preparing for judicial services by offering coaching. R K Swami is the director of the institute.

== Courses ==
- Bachelor of Business Administration [BBA]
- Bachelor of Journalism and Mass Communication [BJMC]
- Bachelor of Arts + Bachelor of Laws [BA LLB]
- Bachelor of Business Administration + Bachelor of Laws [BBA LLB]

BBA and BA (JMC) courses use Common Entrance Test (CET) conducted by Guru Gobind Singh Indraprastha University, New Delhi. For courses, related to law, Common Law Admission Test (CLAT) scores are used.

== Festivals and events ==
- Vritika2020 - Virtual Media Festival (November 2020)
- International media conference ICAN
- Model United Nation
- Innovative International Moot Court Competition
- National Moot Court Competition
- Hindi Diwas Week (13 - 16 September 2021)
- International Symposium on Environmental sustainability (25-26 March 2022)

== Events and conferences hosted ==
International Media Conference ICAN 2018 was inaugurated at Delhi Metropolitan Education in March 2018. The institute also hosted the National Conference- Mergers & Acquisitions: Legal & Managerial Review in 2019. In 2020, National Conference- Genesis to Terminus of Article 370: Socio-Legal Perspectives was also hosted at DME.

== Awards, accolades, and rank ==
- in Times of India Top Emerging BBA Institutes survey
- top 70 BBA institutes Times B School 2020 survey
