= Institute of Vocational Studies =

Educational institution in New Delhi, India

Coordinates: 28.532459°N 77.225483°E

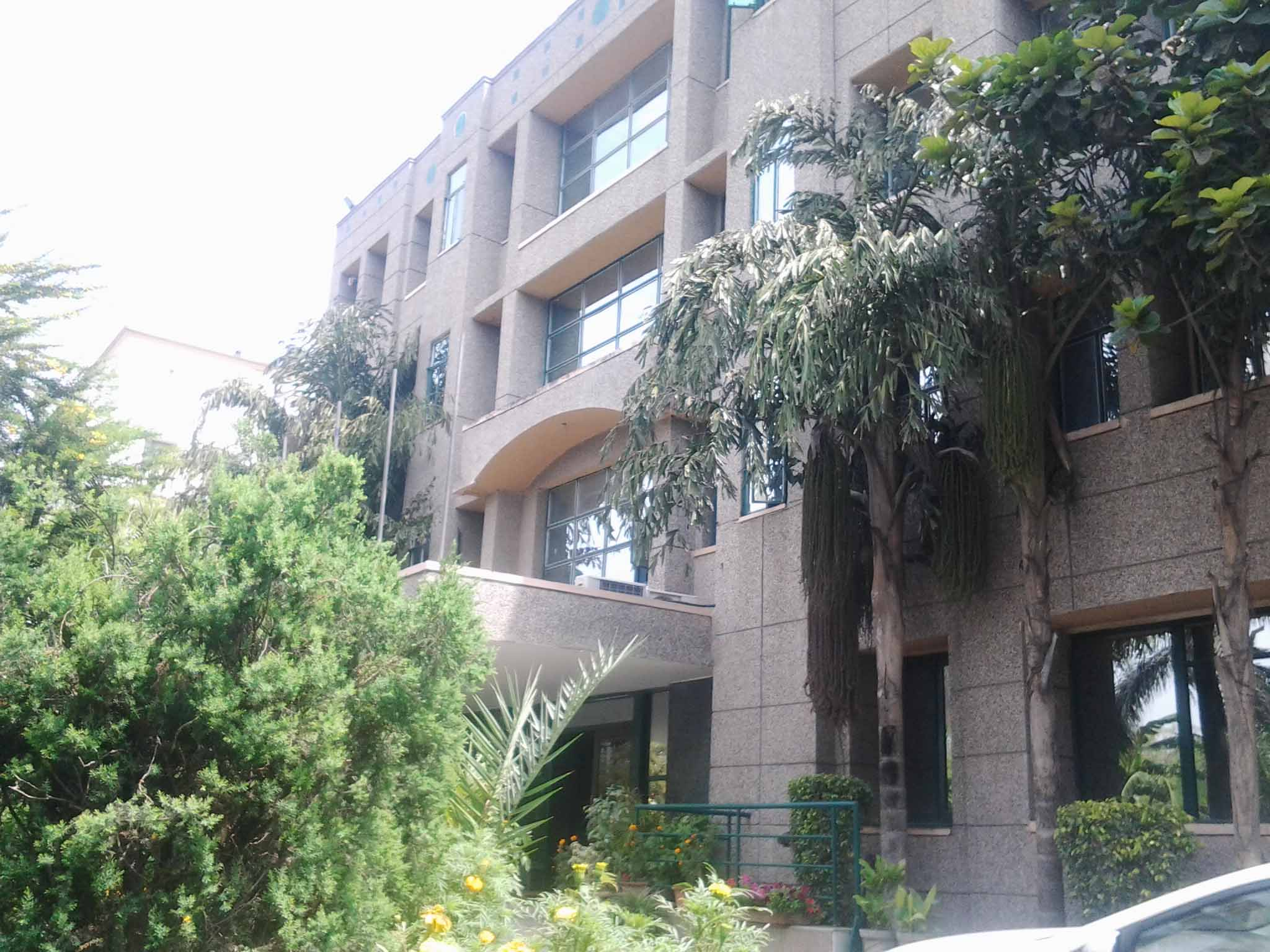
- Campus Building Institute of Vocational Studies
- Type: College
- Established: 2000
- Affiliations: IP University
- Chairman: Shaukat ali
- Principal: Dr. Mandira Gupta
- Faculty: 5
- Location: New Delhi, Delhi, India
- Campus: Urban
- Colors
- Nickname: IVS
- Website: www.awadh.org.in

Institute of Vocational Studies (IVS) is the main campus of the Awadh Group of Institutions. It is located at Awadh Bhawan FC-31, Institutional Area, Sheikh Sarai-II, New Delhi, India. It has a campus spread over one acre of land. The college is affiliated to Guru Gobind Singh Indraprastha University under the name of Institute of Vocational Studies.

== History ==
Awadh Centre of Education was established in 1995, to improve quality standards of education to all whether they are socially backward or belong to minority communities in particular. In 1999 the college started the Institute of Rehabilitation Medicine & Allied Sciences (IRMAS) followed by the Institute of Vocational Studies (IVS) in 2003–04.

== Awadh Group of Institutions ==
=== Institute of Vocational Studies ===
==== B.Ed (Bachelor of Education) ====
B.Ed (Bachelor of Education) is an undergraduate two-year professional degree programme which prepares students for work as school teachers. The institute is recognized by the National Council of Teacher Education (NCTE) Ministry of Human Resource Development (HRD), Government of India and approved by Directorate of Higher Education (DHE) of the Govt. of NCT of Delhi. The institute is affiliated to GGSIPU under the name of Institute of Vocational Studies and nationally accredited with "A" grade by NAAC in 2011.

==== ETE ====
ETE (Elementary Teacher Education) is the two-year diploma in elementary teacher education.
