= Suraj Prasad Singh =

Indian jurist and educational administrator (1937–2020)

Dr. Suraj Prasad Singh

28th Vice-chancellor of the University of Lucknow
- In office 1995–1997
- Appointed by: Motilal Vora, Governor of Uttar Pradesh

Personal details
- Born: 1 September 1937 Lucknow
- Died: 10 June 2020 (aged 82) Delhi
- Spouse: Late Kamini Singh
- Children: 3 daughters and 1 son
- Education: University of Lucknow, Cornell University
- Occupation: Administrator, Lawyer, Professor

Suraj Prasad Singh (commonly known as S. P. Singh) was an Indian jurist and educational administrator. He served as the head of the Faculty at Makerere University during a foreign assignment by the Government of India to East Africa. His administrative roles included being the Director General of MERI Educational Institutions in Sampla and the Vice-Chancellor of Lucknow University. As the founder-Director General of Amity Law School, Noida, he played a role in advancing legal education in India.

Singh was a Professor and Head at Delhi University and served as the Vice-Chancellor of Lucknow University from 1995 to 1997. Under his leadership, the university introduced its five-year law course. He further held the position of Head of the Law Department at Delhi University. In addition, he was the Director of Research & Studies at the Institute of Company Secretaries of India (Govt. of India), New Delhi.

His areas of specialization included Taxation, Corporate Law, and the Law of Torts, and he authored numerous works in these fields. He died on 10 June 2020 at the age of 82.

== Education ==
He completed his LL.M. at Cornell University, United States, on an International Studies Fellowship awarded by the Ford Foundation during 1965–66. He later earned his LL.D. from the University of London.

== Books ==
He authored books and gave his legal opinion on various aspects of law, Taxation, Corporate Law and Law of Tort. His works are 'Law and Society' and 'Law of Tort'.
