= Durga Shakti Nagpal =

Indian bureaucrat (born 1985)

Smt. Durga Shakti Nagpal
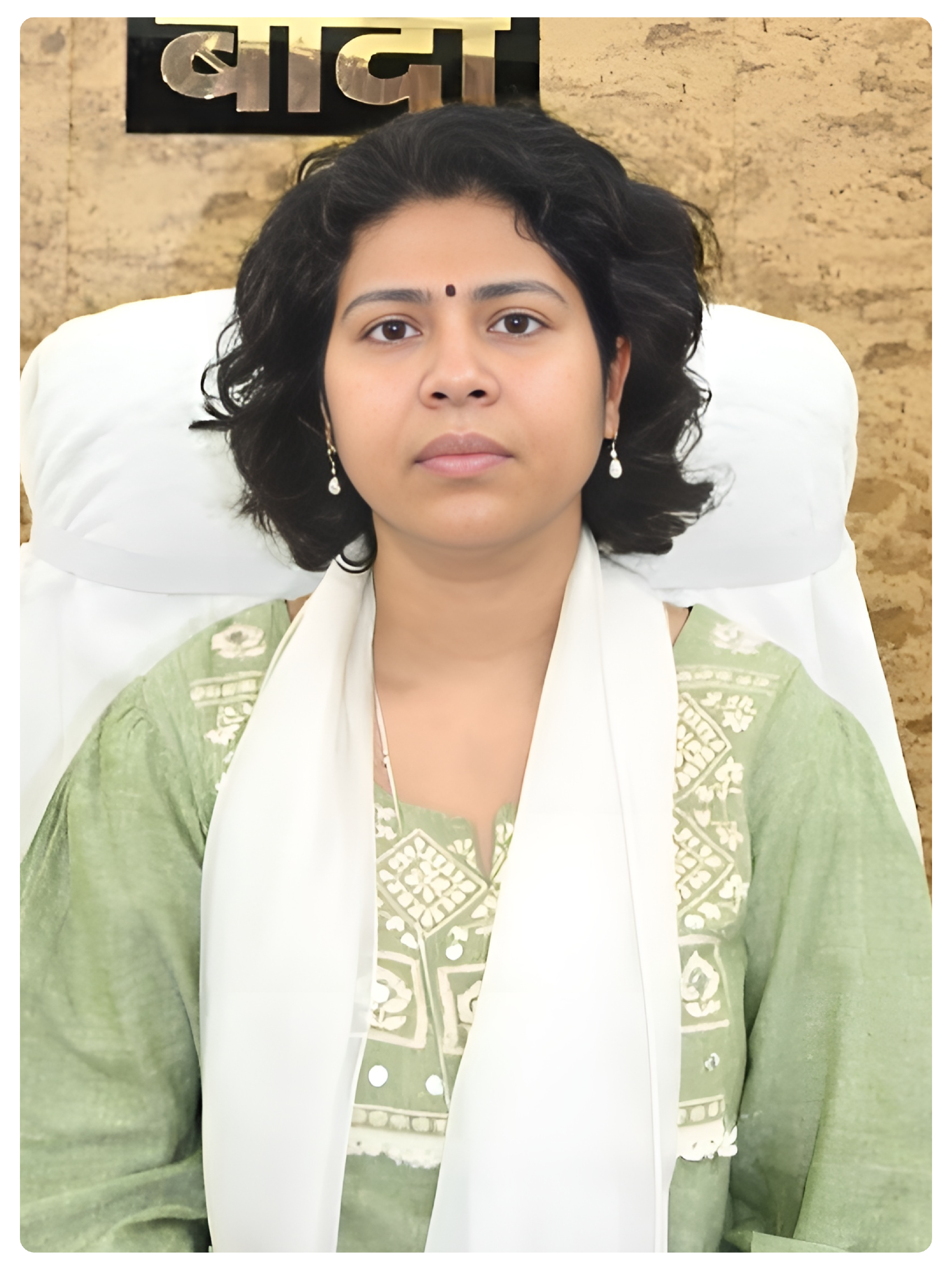
- Photo of when she was DM & Collector of Banda in 2024
- Born: 25 June 1985 (age 41); Agra, Uttar Pradesh, India
- Education: Bachelor of Technology in computer science
- Alma mater: Indira Gandhi Institute of Technology
- Occupation: Bureaucrat
- Years active: 2010–present
- Employer: Government of India
- Organization: Indian Administrative Service
- Known for: Actions against corruption and illegal sand mining
- Spouse(s): Abhishek Singh (IAS) and Actor
- Children: 2

Durga Shakti Nagpal (born 25 June 1985) is an Indian bureaucrat and Indian Administrative Service (IAS) officer of Uttar Pradesh cadre and 2010 batch. She's currently posted as a DM & Collector of Lakhimpur Kheri. She came into public view after launching a massive drive against corruption and illegal sand mining within her jurisdiction of Gautam Budh Nagar as Joint Magistrate. In July 2013, she was suspended by the Akhilesh Yadav led Government of UP for allegedly demolishing an illegal mosque wall in Kadalpur village near Jewar, which resulted in severe opposition as it was perceived to be based on flimsy grounds.

There was a growing demand from various political parties, associations of Indian bureaucrats, and by the general public on online social media for her suspension to be revoked. Her suspension was revoked by the Government of UP on 26 September 2013 and she was transferred to Kanpur Dehat.

Durga Nagpal was appointed as Officer on Special Duty (OSD) to the Union Agriculture & Farmers Welfare Minister, Radha Mohan Singh on 14 January 2015. On 31 March 2023, she got her first posting as District Collector and District Magistrate (DM) of Banda in UP.

== Early life ==
Durga Nagpal was born in Agra, Uttar Pradesh on 25 June 1985. Her father is a retired government officer who was awarded the President's Medal for distinguished service at the Delhi Cantonment Board. Her grandfather was a police officer who was murdered in 1954 while on duty in Sadar Bazaar, Delhi.

She graduated from the Indira Gandhi Delhi Technical University in 2007 with an undergraduate degree in computer engineering. She obtained an All India Rank of 20 in the UPSC Civil Services Examination in 2009, after which she joined the Indian Administrative Service (IAS). In her first attempt to pass the civil service exam, she was accepted into the Indian Revenue Service (IRS), but chose to take the UPSC exam another time.

== Family ==
She is married to Abhishek Singh, who is an IAS officer of 2011 batch. She met Singh while preparing for the UPSC examinations in 2009. Abhishek Singh is also an actor and has worked in movies.

The Government of UP led by Yogi Adityanath suspended Mr. Singh since 7 February 2023 following his absence for 82 days from office without any information. Later, he resigned from the office.

== Career ==
Nagpal began her career in the Punjab cadre of the IAS. She joined the Mohali district administration in June 2011, and served there for fourteen months. As a trainee IAS officer in Punjab, she exposed a land scam in Mohali.

In August 2012, she moved to the Uttar Pradesh (UP) cadre as the Sub-Divisional Magistrate (SDM) of Noida, after marrying Abhishek Singh. She was later appointed as the Joint Magistrate in Gautam Budh Nagar. She came into public notice after acting against the "sand mafia" in Greater Noida, Uttar Pradesh by forming special investigation teams to stop the illegal sand-mining in the Yamuna and Hindon river banks. Under her leadership, the administration confiscated 24 dumper trucks and 300 trolleys used in illegal operations, and arrested 15 people who were fined ₹20 million (US$207,685).

=== Crackdown on illegal mining ===
Most of the sand-mining activity in the NCR region, comprising Noida (Uttar Pradesh), Faridabad (Haryana) and Delhi, is illegal as no environment impact assessment (EIA) has been carried out, and it is estimated that about 250 to 350 truckloads of sand is illegally dredged every day. The cost of this sand varies from ₹1 billion (US$10 million) per month to ₹5 billion (US$52 million) per annum. According to environmentalists and engineers, the massive amount of mining is responsible for soil-erosion and changing the natural flow of the Hindon and Yamuna, which shifted its course by about 500 metres toward east and posed a threat to flood embankments in six sectors of Noida. A "Special Mining Squad" was established by the Noida district administration to curb sand mining and was expected to succeed, but high demand of sand for increased construction activity, police inaction and the political nexus with the "sand mafia" has ensured that various rules to safeguard the environment are regularly flouted.

After receiving many complaints of dredging in the Yamuna and Hindon rivers banks, the UP Chief Minister's office in Lucknow asked the GB Nagar district administration to prevent further illegal activity. Nagpal, as the SDM, oversaw a large operation to stop illegal sand mining in the district, and used surprise and secrecy to arrest illegal miners and to confiscate their machinery. On 23 July 2013, Nagpal had said that she would take strict action against dredgers engaged in illegal mining, adding that such activity could affect the environment adversely. Since April 2013, the Uttar Pradesh Police had filed 17 FIRs and the Chief Judicial magistrate had ordered the arrest of illegal sand miners in 22 cases. From April to June 2013, the police had impounded 297 vehicles and machinery used for illegal mining and collected Rs 8,234,000 in fines. Under Nagpal, a joint operation involving the revenue, police and transport departments was launched and villages of Asgarpur, Nangla Wajidpur, Gulavli, Kambakshpur, Jaganpur Chaproli were monitored. On 25 July, the government transferred the mining officer of the GB Nagar district Ashish Kumar, who was assisting Nagpal, to Bulandshahr. Before being transferred, Kumar survived three attempts on his life, the last one was on 9 February 2013. Nagpal was also targeted on 26 April 2013, during a visit to the Kasna police station. These attacks were attributed to the "sand mafia" operating in the district.

On the night of 29 July 2013, the Gautam Buddha Nagar police arrested 15 persons and confiscated 26 vehicles in the district and registered seven cases, some of which were in Dankaur and Greater Noida areas.

=== Suspension ===
Nagpal was suspended on 28 July 2013, a day after she allegedly demolished a wall of an under-construction mosque in Kadalpur village, in the Rabupura area of Jewar. The construction of the mosque had not been cleared by the state government. Whether Nagpal was actually involved in the demolition of the wall, and whether she was justified in her actions even if she was, are disputed. Her supporters and most of the media sources claim that Nagpal did not order the demolition of the wall and was not even present at the site when the incident happened. According to them, she was targeted due to her campaign against illegal sand-mining, and allegations of Nagpal's involvement in the demolition are false. However, there are other sources which quote residents of Kadalpur village claiming that Nagpal personally supervised the demolition of the wall.

On 16 August, Nagpal submitted her reply to the chargesheet filed by the UP government, in which she declared herself innocent and said that her action was within the rules of service and as per the directions of the Supreme Court. On 28 August, Noida district magistrate Ravikant Singh, who backed Nagpal's actions, was transferred from his post and was put on a wait list.

=== Suspension revoked ===
Nagpal, accompanied by her husband Abhishek Singh, met Chief Minister Akhilesh Yadav on 21 September 2013 for the first time since her suspension. Her suspension was revoked by the UP government on 22 September 2013, and she joined as Joint Magistrate of Kanpur Dehat district on 5 October 2013.

=== Targeting of Family ===
On 11 October 2014, Nagpal's husband, Abhishek Singh, also a bureaucrat was suspended. Abhishek Singh was the SDM (Sub Divisional Magistrate) in Mahawan, Mathura, was suspended by the chief minister Akhilesh Yadav, for allegedly treating a teacher, Fauran Singh, in an inhuman manner. Abhishek Singh denies the charges, while the government refuses to elaborate further on what inhuman actions he was guilty of.

== Reactions to her suspension ==
=== Public ===
The administrative actions and subsequent suspension of Nagpal received widespread attention in India. She was widely praised for making efforts to clean up the corruption in the Indian political system. References were made with the Hindu goddess Durga for taking action against the politically well-connected sand-mining mafia and real estate barons. According to Surinder S. Jodhka, professor and chair at the Centre for the Study of Social Systems in Jawaharlal Nehru University (JNU), the protest after Nagpal's suspension are due to the growing discontent within India's growing middle-class with criminalisation in politics. Due to the public protests, the UP government had to engage in damage control, highlighting its welfare schemes and announcing that it is considering to set up a task force to check illegal mining.

Kiran Bedi and large number of people on social media like Facebook and Twitter protested against the IAS officer's suspension. Several serving and retired IAS officers like former Central Vigilance Commissioner (CVC) N. Vittal, former cabinet secretaries T. S. R. Subramanian and Naresh Chandra, and former Comptroller and Auditor General (CAG) Vinod Rai came out in support of Nagpal, calling her actions bold and courageous, and asked the Chief Secretary to revoke her suspension. The All India IAS Association, a national body of IAS officers, termed the government's actions "wrong" and believes that Nagpal was suspended due to her stringent actions which hurt the sand-mafia. It has demanded immediate revocation of her suspension, and called the incident "demoralising" for young IAS officers.

The collective voicing of these concerns by the state's IAS officers was deemed unusual and surprised the ruling Samajwadi Party. Senior officers have attributed this backlash to the general feeling of discontentment in the officer cadre, which they say is due to increasing political interference in public administration. On 1 August, in a rare act, thousands of IAS officers filed a petition to the Department of personnel and training, demanding intervention by the Central government to direct the UP government to revoke Durga's suspension.

On 5 August 2013, reacting to the suspension of Nagpal, the National Green Tribunal (NGT) ordered a pan-India suspension of all sand mining activity carried without a license from the Ministry of Environment and Forests.

=== Political parties ===
Since Nagpal's suspension came to public view, it has been alleged that then Samajwadi Party leader Narendra Bhati (later joined BJP), who had cabinet-minister rank as the then chairperson of the UP State Agro Industrial Corporation Limited, was responsible for getting her abruptly suspended because he was frustrated by Nagpal's drive against illegal mining. Bhati was later recorded on video boasting about getting the officer suspended within 40 minutes. Other leaders of the Samajwadi party such as Azam Khan and Naresh Agarwal had issued statements supporting the suspension order.

The then opposition parties in the state of Uttar Pradesh, Bharatiya Janata Party (BJP) and the Bahujan Samaj Party accused the state government of ignoring the rule of law and protecting criminals. The former president of the BJP Nitin Gadkari criticised the action as "... fanning communal and caste-based sentiments" and "harassing a good officer for vote bank politics..." The BJP in Uttar Pradesh asked the state's then Governor BL Joshi to intervene and revoke the suspension.

On 2 August 2013, the Indian National Congress condemned the suspension order and said that public reactions of Samajwadi Party leaders supporting the suspension order, indicated that those orders were dictated by the sand mining mafia. However, it also criticised the "arbitrary demolition" of the mosque's wall. UPA chairperson Sonia Gandhi wrote a letter to the then Prime Minister Manmohan Singh, demanding fair treatment of the officer.

=== State government ===
The Samajwadi Party government said in a statement that Nagpal was suspended for demolishing a mosque's wall and the Chief Minister of Uttar Pradesh Akhilesh Yadav justified the order saying that Nagpal's actions "lacked foresight and disturbed communal harmony" and she was suspended due to "administrative compulsion to ease communal tension". This was later refuted by reports that the area had not reported any communal tension. The Station House Officer (SHO) of Rabupura police station said that since the demolition took place in night, most residents were not even aware of the incident. The demolition was reportedly executed in compliance to Supreme Court orders forbidding construction of illegal religious structures on public land. The court, in a judgement passed in 2009 had ruled that "no new temples, mosques, churches and gurdwaras can be constructed on public parks, public streets and public spaces" and "the ban must be enforced even if it gave rise to a law and order problem."

According to the report on the demolition incident submitted by Ravikant Singh, District Magistrate (DM) of Gautam Buddha Nagar district to the UP government, Nagpal did not demolish a wall of any religious structure, in fact there was no religious structure in place. The construction of the wall had just begun, and on being warned by Ms. Nagpal of the structure being constructed on government land, the local residents decided to dismantle the constructed wall themselves. The report called Nagpal's actions "blemish-free". The report also says that there was no communal tension or the possibility of any clashes between religious communities. The UP government appointed a committee to verify the DM's report.

After the IAS officers' association protested on 29 July, Uttar Pradesh Chief Secretary said that the suspension order would be reviewed, but despite the assurances, no decision has been taken. After the suspension, Nagpal was attached to the Board of Revenue in Lucknow, the state capital.

=== Kadalpur ===
The residents of Kadalpur village (Jewar) however challenged the anti-corruption narrative in the media, and say that the suspension order was justified. They even threatened to protest if she is reinstated. They said that the mosque was being built on gram sabha land and they had got the panchayat's approval, adding that they were unaware about seeking permission for it. The construction of the mosque was started in 2011, hence they questioned the delayed response of the authorities. Stressing on Nagpal's "high-handedness" and getting the police to demolish it, they said they requested more time to obtain the construction permission, which she rejected. On the District Magistrate's report to the UP government, they claimed that he did not contact them or any of the panchayat officials. They said that donations for the construction of temples and mosques were given by everyone, and they aim to re-build the mosque.

Dhirendra Singh, spokesperson for the Uttar Pradesh Congress party, said that the villagers were not aware of the Supreme Court rulings and it was the duty of the administration to direct them into getting permission and at least stop the construction temporarily. The majority of the villagers are Muslims and the rest are Hindus, and there is a minimal threat for communal violence there.

A month later the villagers said they felt cheated by the UP government since permission to build it was still not given; they blamed the Samajwadi Party leaders for unnecessarily punishing her. They said that the party leaders should have got them permission to build the mosque at that time, preventing this incident from happening.

=== Public-interest litigations ===
The suspension order of Nagpal was challenged in the Allahabad High Court on 30 July 2013 through a Public interest litigation (PIL). The petition was filed by social activist Nutan Thakur at the Lucknow bench of the court. It also requested the court to direct the central government to ask the state governments to prevent harassment of those officers who have ordered action against illegal construction of religious places, and illegal mining. On 1 August, the court ruled that the suspension is not a matter of a PIL, and the officer should directly approach the court. It however praised her work in preventing illegal sand mining and ordered both the central and the state government to report how they are tackling illegal mining and what security is being provided to the officers engaged in stopping it.

On 8 August, the Supreme Court of India accepted a PIL filed by an advocate M. L. Sharma. The PIL sought to dismiss all charges against Nagpal and argued that Nagpal was suffering hardship for following the court's rulings in 2009 and 2010 regarding demolition of illegal religious structures. On 16 August, the court refused to accept the PIL, questioning the standing of the lawyer, but saying that "it may entertain the petition if she (Nagpal) herself approaches the court." The court also sought an explanation from the UP government for arresting Kanwal Bharti, a scholar who allegedly wrote a post on Facebook in support of Nagpal. The central government had passed an advisory notification based on an earlier order of the court which said that a person cannot be arrested for posting objectionable comments on social networking sites without taking permission from a high-ranking police official.

=== Intervention by central government ===
On 31 July, the central government said that they are awaiting a detailed report on her suspension from the state within 15 days. The Minister of State for Personnel V. Narayanasamy, during a meeting with a delegation from All India IAS Officers' Association assured that justice will be done to Ms. Nagpal. He later assured that both version of the incident will be taken into account before reaching a decision. As per the All India Services (Discipline And Appeal) Rules, 1969, the UP government cannot keep her under suspension for more than 90 days, pending disciplinary proceedings, without the consent of Central Government.

On 5 August 2013, Prime Minister Manmohan Singh said that the central government had asked the UP government to provide details of the case. On 19 August, associations of the Indian Administrative Service (IAS), Indian Police Service (IPS) and Indian Forest Service (IFoS) met with the Secretary of Department of Personnel and Training (DoPT) S K Sarkar and demanded that the central government should modify the rules related to suspension of bureaucrats by state governments, as those rules were widely abused. The three associations want the central government instead of various state governments to have the authority to suspend any All India Services officer.

On 20 August, the central government decided not to intervene in the suspension of Nagpal, as she did not appeal or challenge the suspension order given by the Uttar Pradesh government. Since Nagpal's suspension on 27 July, the centre had issued three reminders to the UP government, seeking a detailed report. On 4 August, the UP government had sent a report on Nagpal's suspension to the DoPT and had served a chargesheet to Nagpal, which deemed her actions as unwarranted and in violation of rules.
