= Bhai Parmanand =

Indian nationalist and prominent leader of the Ghadar Party and Hindu Mahasabha

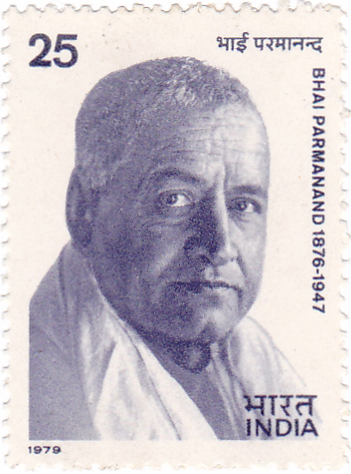
- Bhai Parmanand on a 1979 stamp of India
- Born: 4 November 1876; Karyala, Jhelum District, Punjab Province, British India (present-day Punjab, Pakistan)
- Died: 8 December 1947 (aged 71); New Delhi, India
- Monuments: Bhai Parmanand Institute of Business Studies
- Occupation: Revolutionary • Freedom Fighter
- Organization: Ghadar Party
- Known for: • Founding member of Ghadar Party • Ghadar Conspiracy
- Notable work: Tarikh-i-Hind
- Movement: Indian Independence Movement • Ghadar Movement
- Children: Bhai Mahavir

Bhai Parmanand (Note: Also spelled as Bhai Premanand.) (4 November 1876 – 8 December 1947) was an Indian nationalist and a prominent leader of the Ghadar Party and Hindu Mahasabha.

== Early life ==
Parmanand was born on 4 November 1876 in Karyala (Punjab, Pakistan) to Bhai Tara Chand Chibber in a prominent Punjabi Mohyal Brahmin family and his father was an active religious missionary within the Arya Samaj movement.

== Views on partition ==
While reading letters of Lala Lajpat Rai to him in 1909, he had jotted an idea that 'the territory beyond Sindh could be united with North-West Frontier Province into a great Musulman Kingdom. The Hindus of the region should come away, while at the same time the Musulmans in the rest of the country should go and settle in this territory'.

== Overseas missions ==
In October 1905, Parmanand visited South Africa and stayed with Mahatma Gandhi as a Vedic missionary. Parmanand visited Guyana in 1910 which was the centre of the Arya Samaj movement in the Caribbean. His lectures increased their following there. In 1911, he visited Lala Hardayal when he was on retreat in Martinique. Parmanand persuaded Hardayal to go to the United States to found a centre for the propagation of the ancient culture of the Aryan people. Hardayal left for America, but soon located himself in Hawaii, where he again went on retreat on Waikiki Beach. A letter from Parmanand prompted his departure for San Francisco where he became an activist in the anarchist movement.

Parmanand toured several British colonies in South America before re-joining Hardayal in San Francisco. He was a founder member of the Ghadar Party. He accompanied Hardayal on a speaking tour to Portland in 1914 and wrote a book for the Ghadar Party called Tarikh-I-Hind. He returned to India as part of the Ghadar Conspiracy claiming he was accompanied by 5,000 Ghadarites. He was part of the leadership of the revolt, and was sent to promote the revolt in Peshawar. He was arrested in connection with the First Lahore Conspiracy Case and was sentenced to death in 1915. The sentence was later commuted to one of transportation for life: he was imprisoned in the Andaman Islands until 1920 and subjected to hard labour. In protest against such harsh treatment of political prisoners, Bhai Parmanand went on hunger strike for two months. The King-Emperor, George V, released him in 1920 as the result of a general amnesty order.

== Death ==
Parmanand died on 8 December 1947 of a heart attack. He was survived by his son Dr. Bhai Mahavir, a prominent member of the Jana Sangh and BJP.

== Legacy ==
Named after him are the Bhai Parmanand Institute of Business Studies in New Delhi, a Public School in East Delhi and a hospital also in Delhi.

== Books ==
- Mera Antim Ashraya
- The Story of My Life
- Kāle pānī kī kārāvāsa kahānī āpabītī
- Jeevan Rahasya
- Veer Vairagi
