= Bhai Parmanand Institute of Business Studies =

Coordinates: 28.630164°N 77.285298°E

- Type: Public
- Established: 1965; 61 years ago
- Affiliations: Delhi Skill and Entrepreneurship University
- Principal: Girish Sharma
- Location: New Delhi, Delhi, 110092, India
- Website: bpibs.in

Bhai Parmanand Institute of Business Studies (BPIBS) is a government higher education institute located in New Delhi, India. It grants various postgraduate and undergraduate programmes, being affiliated to Delhi Skill and Entrepreneurship University (DSEU). The institute was established in the year 1965 by the Government of the NCT of Delhi and it was named after renowned Arya Samaji, Hindu reformist and Indian nationalist leader Bhai Parmanand in 1986. The institute is approved by the Directorate of Training and Technical Education and by the All India Council for Technical Education (AICTE). It is also ISO 9001:2015 certified.

== History ==
The institute was established in 1965 as a unit under the polytechnic of technical education department. In 1972 the institute was given independent institute status and renamed Institute of Commercial Practice. It 1986 it was renamed Bhai Parmanand Institute of Business Studies, after the nationalist leader, Bhai Parmanand.

== Campus ==
The main campus is located at Shakarpur, Delhi in an area of 8.5 acres allotted by the Delhi Development Authority. The campus is shared with Ambedkar Institute of Technology, formally known as the Ambedkar Polytechnic. On Shakarpur campus the Govt. of NCT of Delhi running two campuses, Bhai Parmanand Institute of Business Studies and Ambedkar Institute of Technology since 1987 and imparting professional education to more than 1500 students.

== Cultural festivals ==
BPIBS organises the following cultural festival:

- Amogh, cultural festival
- Anugoonj, annual festival of Guru Gobind Singh Indraprastha University
- Green Fair, organised by the Department of Environments, GNCTD
