= University School of Biotechnology =

College in New Delhi, India

Coordinates: 28.5943°N 77.0202°E

University School of Biotechnology (USBT)
- Type: Public university
- Established: 1999; 27 years ago
- Affiliations: Guru Gobind Singh Indraprastha University
- Dean: Dr. Promila Gupta
- Faculty: 11+
- Students: 280+
- Undergraduates: 200+
- Postgraduates: 50+
- Doctoral students: 15+
- Location: New Delhi, Delhi, India
- Campus: 78 acres (32 ha); Urban
- Website: ipu.ac.in/usbt/usbthome.htm

University School of Biotechnology (USBT) is a constituent institute of Guru Gobind Singh Indraprastha University. The school offers a full-time Bachelor of Technology, Master of Engineering, as well as PhD programs.

== History ==
Founded in 1999, University School of Biotechnology (USBT) was established by Government of Delhi as one of twelve University Schools of Studies under the Guru Gobind Singh Indraprastha University. The school has recently transferred to Dwarka Campus of the university. The University School of Biotechnology is ranked third all over India after National Dairy Research Institute of Karnal and Department of Biochemical Engineering & Biotechnology, IIT Delhi.

== Programs offered ==
USBT began with a five and half year integrated course of BTech/MTech with eleven semesters and PhD program. But from the academic session 2004-2005 onwards, the MTech program has been delinked from the BTech program and the two program are being offered under dual degree program – BTech/MTech dual degree course and separate MTech program in different fields of biotechnology. As with other major institutes of India, the merit-based All India Common Entrance Test of GGSIPU entranced exam is used for admissions to USBT. Students that have taken courses in physics, chemistry, mathematics, biology, or biotechnology during senior school are eligible for the entrance exam. An overwhelming demand for biotechnology professionals led to an increase in seats from 30 to 45 in the academic session of 2006-2007 and further in 2009-2010. In the academic session of 2021-2022, seats were further increased from 45 to 53. Now as of 2024 UG seats for BTech (Biotechnology) increases to 80 seats.

USBT offers following programs:-

- B.Tech (Biotechnology) - 4 Years UG
- M.Tech (Biotechnology) - 2 Years PG
- M.Tech (Industrial biotechnology) - 2 Years PG
- M.Tech (Food biotechnology) - 2 Years PG
- PhD– Minimum 2 years

== See also ==
- Guru Gobind Singh Indraprastha University
- Education in Delhi
- Mahesh Verma
