= Management Education & Research Institute =

Management Education & Research Institute (MERI)
- Type: Private College
- Established: 1995
- Affiliations: Guru Gobind Singh Indraprastha University, NAAC, UGC
- Director: Lalit Aggarwal
- Location: New Delhi, Delhi, India
- Campus: Janakpuri
- Website: meri.edu.in/meri

Management Education & Research Institute (MERI) is a private college established in 1995, affiliated with Guru Gobind Singh Indraprastha University and located in Janakpuri, Delhi. MERI is recognised as non-government unaided institute under section 2(f) by UGC. Admission to MERI (except for PGDM programme) is through the Common Entrance Test (CET) conducted by Guru Gobind Singh Indraprastha University.

== Recognition and accreditation ==
MERI has been accredited by the National Assessment and Accreditation Council (NAAC) with an "A" grade. The institute offers MBA, BBA, B.COM, BCA, BA(JMC)PGDM full-time courses. This institute is also approved by AICTE
