= University School of Information, Communication and Technology =

University School of Information Communication and Technology
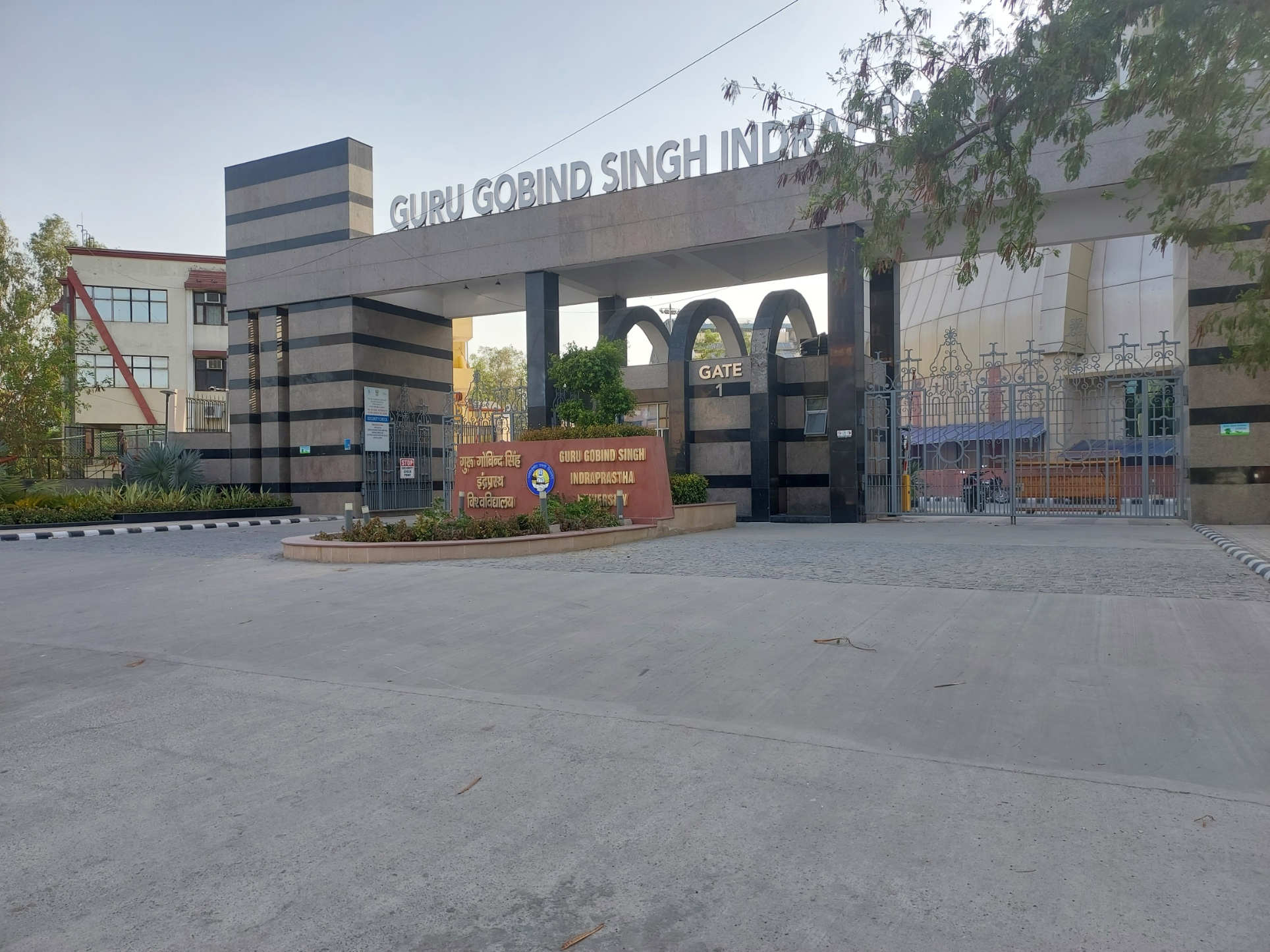
- Former name: University School of Information Technology
- Motto: ज्योतिर्वृणीत तमसो विजानन
- Motto in English: Light of intelligence cleaves the darkness
- Type: Public
- Established: 1999; 27 years ago
- Parent institution: Guru Gobind Singh Indraprastha University
- Affiliations: UGC
- Dean: Anjana Gosain
- Location: Dwarka, Delhi, India; 28.595016°N 77.018942°E
- Campus: 60 acres (24 ha); Urban
- Website: ipu.ac.in/usict/

University School of Information, Communication and Technology (formerly University School of Information Technology) is a constituent institute of Guru Gobind Singh Indraprastha University located in Delhi, India.

== Academics ==
=== Academic Programmes ===
The Institute offers Dual Degree B.Tech/M.Tech ( in CSE, IT and ECE), Master of Technology in Robotics and Automation Engineering the emerging branch of future technologies, Master of Computer Applications ( Software Engineer ), Doctor of Philosophy (PhD).

== See also ==
- List of courses and colleges affiliated with GGSIPU
- Education in Delhi
