= Delhi Skill and Entrepreneurship University =

Public university in Delhi, India

- Motto: Crafting Excellence
- Type: Public
- Established: 2020; 6 years ago
- Affiliations: UGC
- Chancellor: Lieutenant Governor of Delhi
- Vice-Chancellor: Ashok Kumar Nagawat
- Location: Delhi, South West Delhi, India; 28.582589°N 77.063721°E
- Campus: Urban
- Colours: Blue and Orange
- Website: dseu.ac.in

The Delhi Skill and Entrepreneurship University (DSEU), is a collegiate public state university located in Delhi, India. In 2020, the Government of the NCT of Delhi reorganised several existing government educational institutions, including the Integrated Institute of Technology (previously affiliated with Guru Gobind Singh Indraprastha University), designating it as one of the primary campuses of the newly established university. A total of 13 government institutes and colleges formerly affiliated with GGSIPU were restructured to function as constituent campuses of DSEU. It offer 15 diploma, 18 undergraduate and 2 postgraduate courses, and has a total of 19 campus in Delhi.

== History ==
Delhi Skill and Entrepreneurship University (DSEU) was established by the Delhi Legislative Assembly as a unitary and teaching university in August 2020 by Government of NCT of Delhi under the provisions of Delhi Skill and Entrepreneurship University Act, 2019. The university is recognised by University Grants Commission (India), under section 12B of the UGC Act.

DSEU was merged with 15 existing government institutes and colleges such as Delhi Institute of Tool Engineering (Wazirpur and Okhla Campus), GB Pant College of Engineering, Integrated Institute of Technology, 10 polytechnics of the Delhi government, and 6 Skill Centres.

== Campuses ==
DSEU consists of 19 campuses located across Delhi.

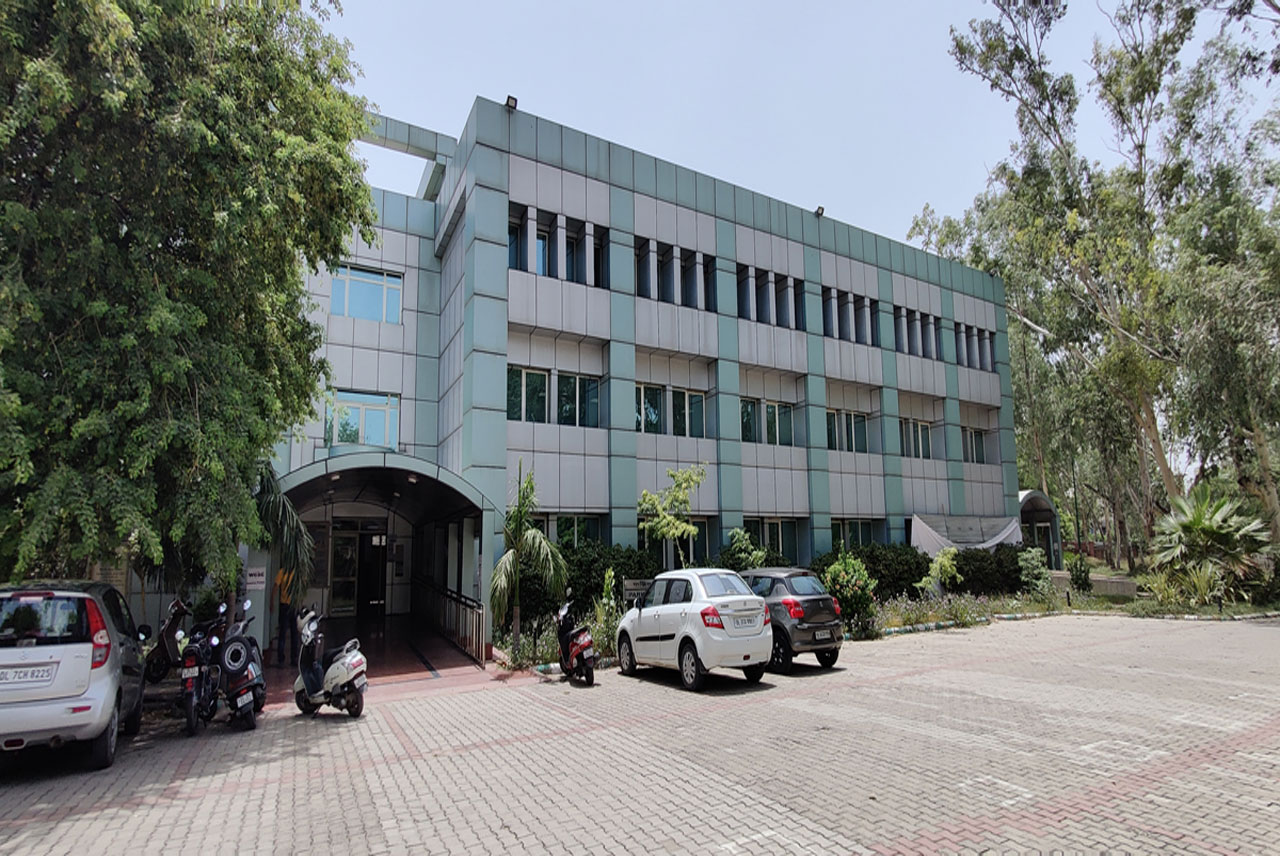
DSEU Vivek Vihar Campus

- Okhla-I Campus was established in 1961 as the Govind Ballabh Pant Institute of Technology. When it became affiliated with DSEU it became the Okhla-I Campus. It is located in Okhla, South East Delhi.
- Ashok Vihar campus was established in 1962 as Aryabhatt Institute of Technology. it is located in Ashok Vihar, North West Delhi.
- Maharani Bagh Campus was established in 1962 as Meerabai Institute of Technology. It is located in Maharani Bagh, South East Delhi.
- Pusa Campus was established in 1962 as Pusa Institute of Technology (PIT), It is located in Pusa, Central Delhi.
- Bhai Parmanand Shakarpur Campus - II was established in 1965, as Govt of NCT of Delhi College, Bhai Parmanand Institute of Business Studies affiliated with Guru Gobind Singh Indraprastha University; but after establishment of Delhi Skill and Entrepreneurship University, the institute was merged with Delhi Skill and Entrepreneurship University.
- Ambedkar Shakarpur Campus - I was established in 1986 as the Ambedkar Institute of Technology. It is located in Shakarpur, East Delhi.
- Pitampura Campus was established in 1986 as Kasturba Institute of Technology for Women. It is located in Pitampura, North West Delhi.
- Rohini Campus was established it in 1995 as Guru Nanak Dev Institute of Technology. It is located in Rohini, North West Delhi.
- Wazirpur Campus was established in 2007 as Delhi Institute of Tool Engineering. It is located in Wazirpur, North West Delhi.
- Okhla-II Campus was established in 2007 as the Delhi Institute of Tool Engineering. It is located in Okhla, South East Delhi.
- Dwarka Campus was established in 2008 as the Integrated Institute of Technology Dwarka. It is located in Dwarka, South West Delhi.
- Siri Fort Campus was established in 2013 as the World Class Skill Centre. It is located in Siri Fort, South Delhi.
- Vivek Vihar Campus was established in 2013 as World Class Skill Centre. It is located in Vivek Vihar, Shahdara.
- Rajokri Campus was established in 2016 as the Rajokari Institute of Technology. It is located in Rajokri, New Delhi.

== Organisation and administration ==
=== Governance ===
The governing officials of the university include the Chancellor, the Vice Chancellor, the Pro-Vice Chancellors, the first members of the Court, the Board of Management, the Academic Council and the Finance Committee of the university.

The President of India is the Visitor of the Delhi Skill and Entrepreneurship University. The Lieutenant Governor of Delhi is the Chancellor of the university. The Vice-Chancellor is appointed by the Chancellor. The Chancellor is the nominal head of the university and the Vice-Chancellor is the executive head of the university.

=== Schools ===
DSEU has its courses divided over 12 schools which are as follows:

- School of Retail Management
- School of Engineering Sciences/ Applied Engineering
- School of Sustainability
- School of Beauty and Wellness
- School of Languages
- School of Logistics and Supply Chain
- School of Innovation and Entrepreneurship
- School of Allied Medical Services
- School of Creative Economy
- School of IT & ITeS
- School of Employability and Wholistic Development
- School of Banking, Financial Services and Insurance

== See also ==
- List of institutions of higher education in Delhi
