= Fairfield Institute of Management and Technology =

Coordinates: 28.523797°N 77.074154°E

- Other names: FIMT
- Type: College
- Established: 2008; 18 years ago
- Affiliations: Guru Gobind Singh Indraprastha University
- Undergraduates: BCA; BBA-G; B.Com; BA.LLB; BBA.LLB
- Location: New Delhi, Delhi, India
- Campus: Urban
- Colors
- Website: www.fimt-ggsipu.org

Fairfield Institute of Management and Technology and School of Law is a semi-private college, affiliated with Guru Gobind Singh Indraprastha University (GGSIPU).

== History ==
Fairfield Institute of Management and Technology (FIMT) was established by the Fairfield Group of Institutions in the year 2008.

== Affiliation ==
The institute is affiliated to Guru Gobind Singh Indraprastha University for all the offered programmes and Affiliated to GGSIP University & an 'A+’ Grade College by DHE, Govt. of NCT Delhi Approved by AICTE BCI & NCTE Recognised under 2(f) of UGC Act of 1956 Department of Higher Education (DHE) and ISO 21001:2018 & ISO 14001:2015 & ISO 9001:2015 certified.

== Schools ==
1. Fairfield School of Law and Legal Studies
- BA.LLB
- BBA.LLB
- LLM
1. Fairfield School of Information Technology
- BCA
1. Fairfield School of Business Studies
- B.Com (Hons.)
- BBA
1. Fairfield School of Journalism and Mass Communication
- BJMC
1. Fairfield School of Economics
- BA.Eco (Hons.)
1. Fairfield School of English Studies
- BA.English
- MA.English
1. Fairfield School of Engineering & Technology
- B.Tech IT
- B.Tech CSE
- B.Tech AI&ML

== Programmes ==
- Bachelor of Arts (English)
- Bachelor of Business Administration integrated with LL.B.
- Bachelor of Arts integrated with LL.B.
- Bachelor of Computer Application
- Bachelor of Journalism
- Bachelor of Business Administration
- Bachelor of Commerce
- Bachelor of Arts (Economics)
- Bachelor of Education
- Master of Laws
- B.Tech
- Master of Arts in English
