= S. P. Singh (biochemist) =

Indian biochemist

Dr. S.P. Singh
- Born: 1 February 1948 (age 78); Agra, United Provinces, India
- Occupation: Professor

S. P. Singh (born 1 February 1948), is a professor of biochemistry.

== Early life and education ==
Singh received his Master's degree from Lucknow University, Uttar Pradesh, India. and his PhD in Medical Biochemistry from Meerut University, Uttar Pradesh, India. He took his early education from a primary village school at Tundla, Agra. Later on he took his education up to 12th standard from Northern Railways Intermediate college where his father was posted in railways as station master.

== Career ==
Singh has written nine biochemistry books, one of which (Manual of Practical Biochemistry) has been translated into Persian and one of which has been written in Hindi at the request of HRD Ministry.

In 1973, he founded the Department of Biochemistry at Baba Raghav Das Medical College, Gorakhpur.

He has taught for 40 years and since 1984 he is Head of the Department of Biochemistry at Maharani Laxmi Bai Medical College, Jhansi, Uttar Pradesh. He has so far published 65 research publications in various national and international journals.

He is Vice President of the Uttar Pradesh Chapter of Association of Clinical Biochemists of India. and serves on the editorial board of the Journal of Advance Researches in Biological Sciences. He is in the society of biological scientists of India,

== Honors and awards ==
- Honored by International association of Lions Club, Jhansi, India (2007)
- Honored by Lions Club, Jhansi, India (1999)
- Honored by Rotary Club, Jhansi, India (1998–99)
- Honored by Janwadi Lekhakh Sangh, Jhansi, India (1997)
- WHO Fellowship at Texas A&M University, U.S.A. (1986)
- Appointed by Medical Council of India as an Inspector to inspect several medical colleges across India
- Appointed by University Grants Commission, Government of India as an Inspector
- Fellow of The Association of Clinical Biochemists of India, ACBI
- Nominated by Government of India for Medical Commonwealth Fellowship, U.K. (1993)

== Bibliography ==
- Singh, S.P. (2009). Concepts of Biochemistry for Physiotherapy and Pharmacy. CBS Publishers. ISBN 978-81-239-1391-9.
- Singh, S.P. (2009). Practical Manual of Biochemistry (6th ed.). CBS Publishers. ISBN 978-81-239-1395-7.
- Singh, S.P. (2009). Textbook of Biochemistry (4th ed.). CBS Publishers. ISBN 978-81-239-1414-5.
- Singh, S.P. (2009). Textbook of Dental Biochemistry (3rd ed.). CBS Publishers. ISBN 978-81-239-1719-1.
- Singh, S.P. (2008). Viva in Biochemistry (4th ed.). CBS Publishers. ISBN 978-81-239-1582-1.
- Singh, Dr.S.P. (2006). Principles of Biochemistry for Home Science and Nursing. CBS Publishers. ISBN 978-81-239-1322-3.
- Singh, S.P. (1995). MCQs in Biochemistry. CBS Publishers.
- Singh, S.P. (1995). Viva Voce and Short Notes in Biochemistry (2nd ed.). CBS Publishers.
- Singh, S.P. (1986). Prayogatmak Jeev Rasayan Vigyan. Haryana Sahitya Academy. (Hindi)
- Singh, S.P. (1995). Manual of Biochemistry. Translated in Persian By A. Nazarian. (Persian)
- Srivastava, Anurag; Joshi, L.D.; Singh, S.P. (1989). "Changes in serum lipids in normal and diabetic guinea pigs on feeding Phaseolus aureus (Green gram)". Indian Journal of Clinical Biochemistry. 4 (1). Springer India: 50–57. doi:10.1007/BF02867652.
