= Faculty of Engineering and Technology, Jamia Millia Islamia =

Engineering school in New Delhi, India

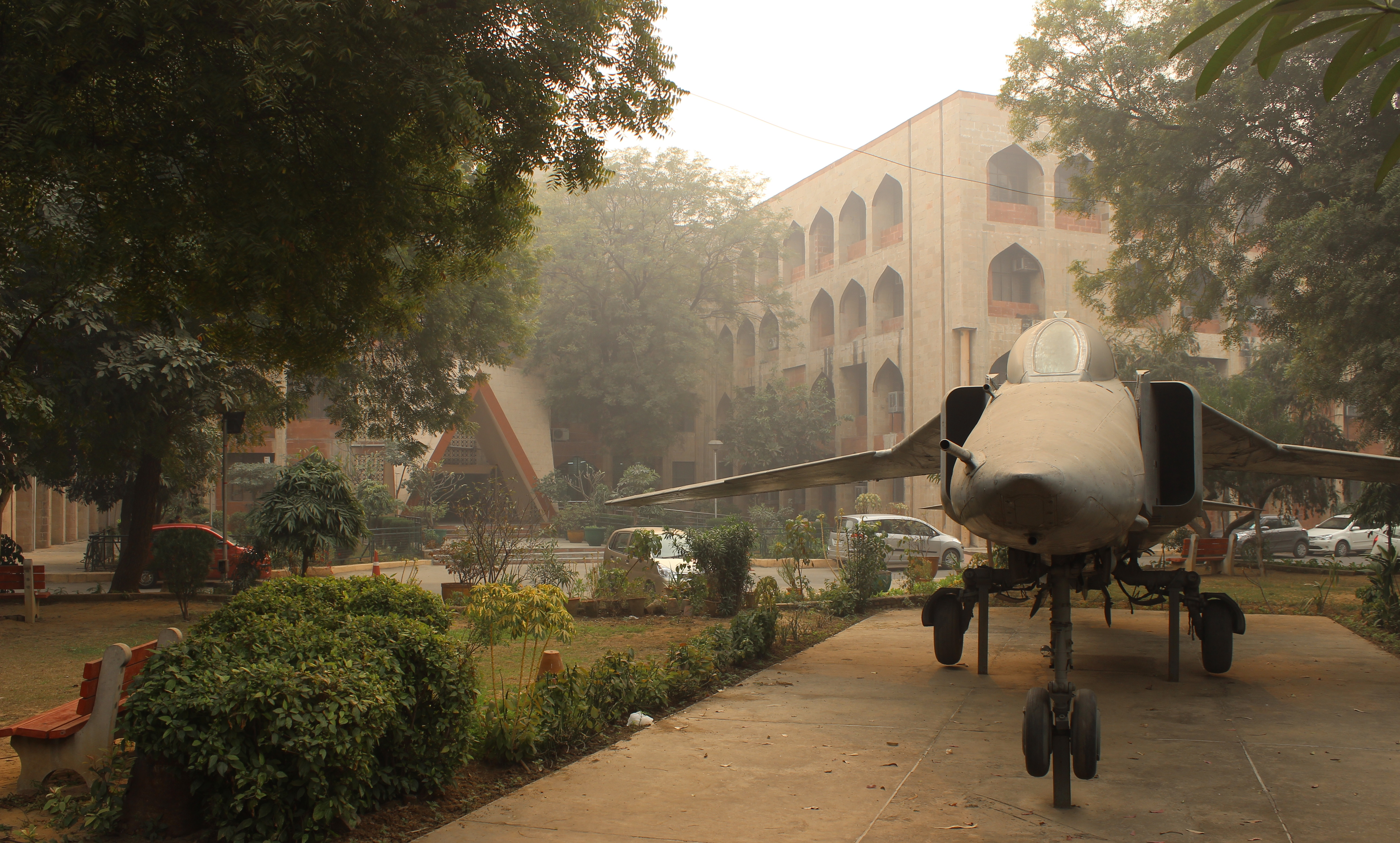
- A fighter jet of the Indian Air Force stands in front of the Faculty of Engineering
- Other name: FET JMI
- Former names: College of Engineering and Technology
- Motto: ʻallam al-insān-a mā lam yaʻlam
- Motto in English: Taught man what he knew not.
- Type: Public
- Established: 1985
- Parent institution: Jamia Millia Islamia
- Academic affiliations: Jamia Millia Islamia
- Dean: Prof. Mohammad Sharif
- Undergraduates: 624
- Location: Delhi, 110025, India; 28.5601°N 77.2794°E
- Campus: Urban, 254 acres (103 ha)
- Website: https://jmi.ac.in/fet

The Faculty of Engineering and Technology, Jamia Millia Islamia (FET, JMI) established in 1985, is a public engineering college of Jamia Millia Islamia university located in Delhi, India providing undergraduate, postgraduate and doctoral education in various fields of engineering and technology. All regular courses of the faculty are approved by the All India Council for Technical Education (AICTE). According to the National Institutional Ranking Framework (NIRF) 2025, FET, JMI was ranked among the top engineering institutions in India and second in Delhi after IIT Delhi.

== History ==
The BE course in civil engineering was started in 1979. The Faculty of Engineering and Technology officially came into being in 1985. Undergraduate programmes in civil, electrical and mechanical engineering began is as old as the institution. Undergraduate programmes in electronics engineering began in 1996 and in computer engineering began in 2000. The building was inaugurated in October 1995. The four-storey structure has pointed arches adorning the windows. The entrance itself is pyramid shaped.

== Campus ==
The Faculty of Engineering and Technology is situated within the campus of Jamia Millia Islamia at Jamia Nagar, South-East Delhi. The main entrance to the campus is through Gate No. 1 of Jamia Millia Islamia. The faculty premises encompass a four-storeyed main building, a library building, a dean's office building, several canteens, and green spaces. Notably, an Indian Air Force MiG-23 aircraft was presented to the faculty in 2010 and is displayed in front of the faculty building.

The university sports complex (officially Nawab Mansur Ali Khan Pataudi Sports Complex) is the best by university standards in the country and has played host to many Ranji Trophy cricket matches including the semi-finals and the finals of university cricket championships. The sports complex also has tennis, basketball, volleyball, football and rugby courts (it was the official practice venue for rugby in the Commonwealth Games 2010) besides indoor facilities for table tennis and badminton apart from a synthetic athletics track. The complex also has a generously equipped gymnasium.

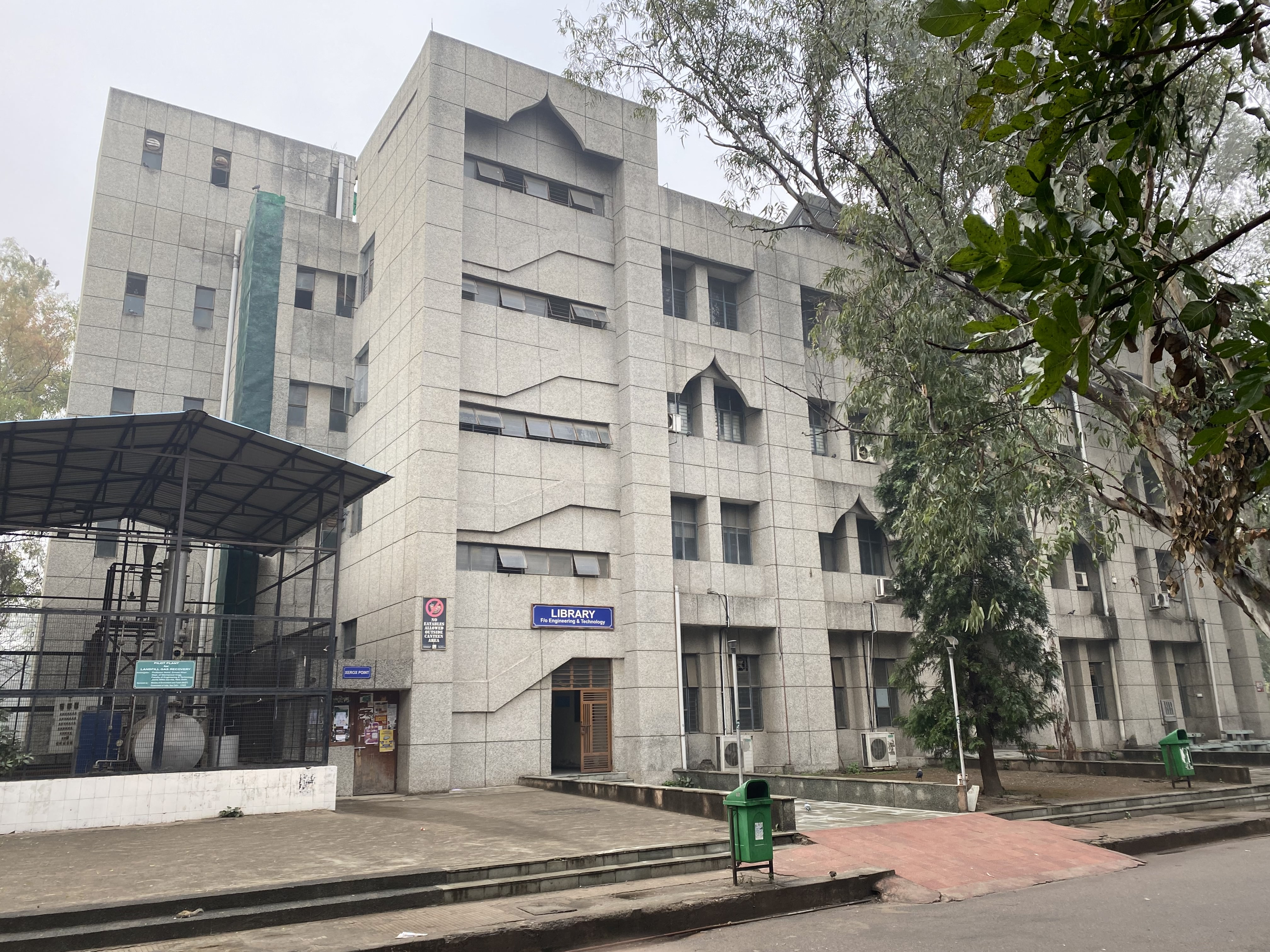
Library building - Faculty of Engineering and Technology

== Admissions ==
Admissions to the Bachelor of Technology programmes are based on the performance in the JEE Main examination conducted by the National Testing Agency.

Admissions towards the M.Tech. programme is based on the performance in GATE examination.

== Departments and academic programmes ==
The Faculty Of Engineering and Technology has the following departments

=== University Polytechnic ===
Started in 1957 as the Civil and Rural Institute, now named as Jamia Polytechnic it is one of the oldest departments of Jamia Millia Islamia operative under the Faculty of Engineering and Technology of the university. It conducts Diploma in Engineering courses of three years duration in the following branches:

- Diploma in Civil Engineering
- Diploma in Computer Engineering
- Diploma in Electrical Engineering
- Diploma in Electronics Engineering
- Diploma in Mechanical Engineering

=== Department of Applied Sciences and Humanities ===
Established in 1996, as one among the departments of the Faculty of Engineering and Technology, this department participates in B.Tech. and M.Tech. programs offered by the faculty. This department offers M.Tech. in the trending and diverse field of Engineering and Technology, M.Tech. Energy Science and M.Tech. Computational Mathematics. In addition, the department offers a two-year M.Sc. Electronic program with an intake of 30 students per year. The M.Sc. Electronics program imparts instruction in the basics of electronics science. The program has earned a prestigious position for itself among similar programs available in the country.

The Department of Applied Sciences and Humanities is also responsible for teaching subjects from the fields of science, humanities, and social studies to B.Tech. students across different years, including courses such as Universal Human Values, Engineering Chemistry, Constitution of India, Indian Traditional Knowledge, Engineering Mathematics, Biology, etc.

=== Department of Computer Engineering ===
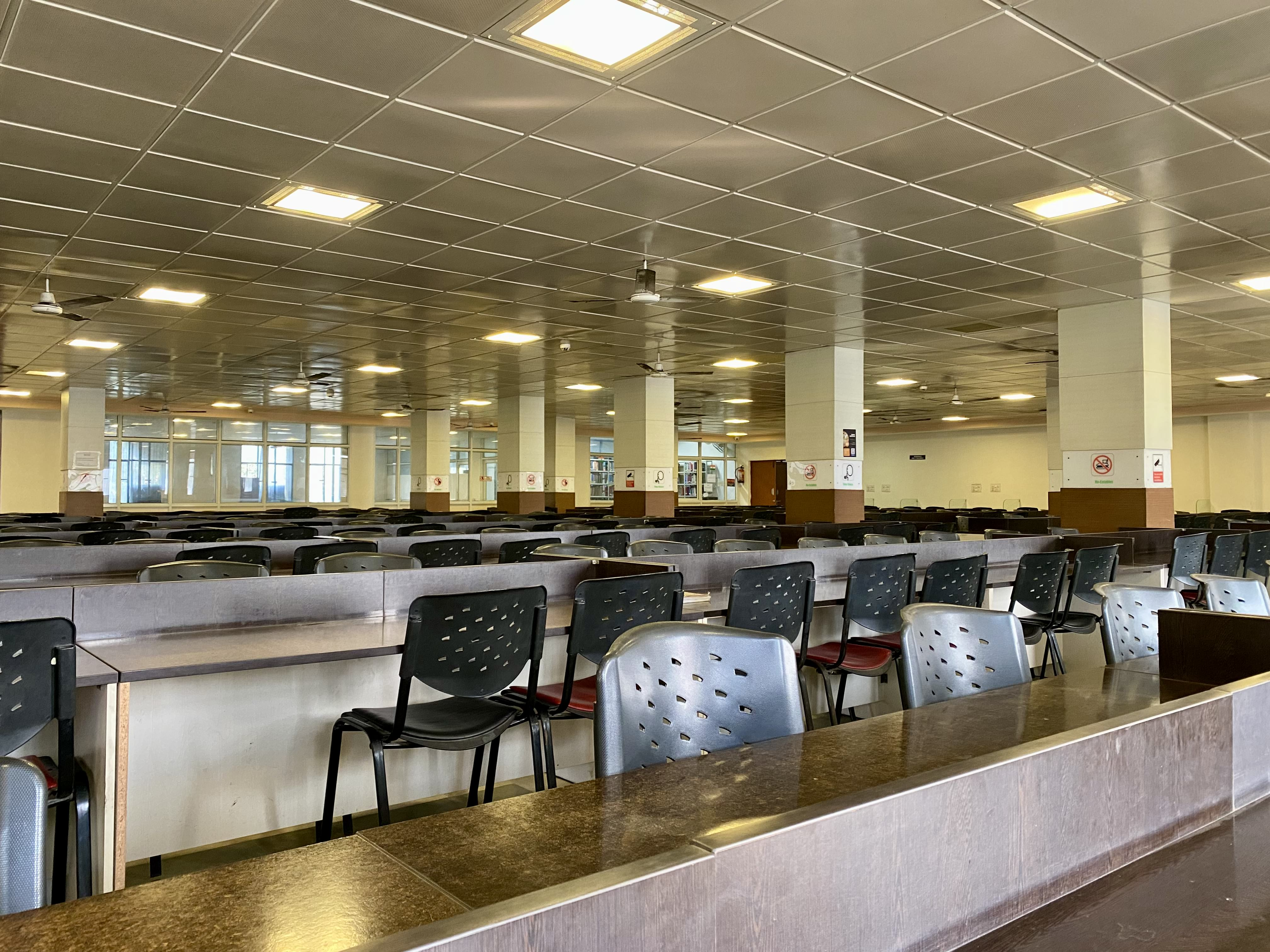
Reading room - Faculty of Engineering and Technology

The Department of Computer Engineering was started in the year 2000. Three undergraduate courses are running in this department, which are B.Tech. in Computer Engineering and the self-financed B.Tech. in Computer Science and Engineering ( Data Sciences) introduced in 2024. Two postgraduate courses are M.Tech in Computer Engineering ( A.I. and ML) and M.Tech. in Data Sciences (self-financed). The department also runs a Ph.D. program, under which a number of research scholars are working in the fields of Networking, Data Mining, Machine Learning, Data Science and Artificial Intelligence, among others.

=== Department of Civil Engineering ===
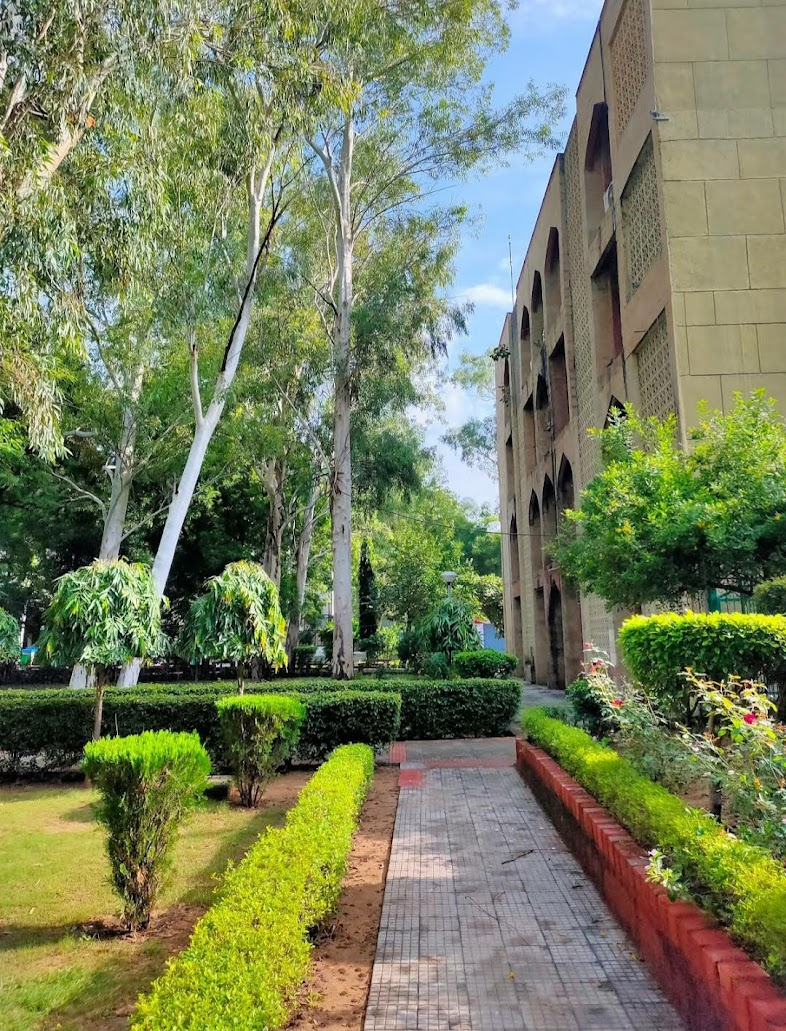
Campus area

The Department of Civil Engineering is one of the oldest and the largest department in the Faculty of Engineering & Technology. The department offers two undergraduate courses in civil engineering. The department also offers Master's programme with specializations in environmental engineering and earthquake engineering. More than 35 Ph.D. research scholars including many from foreign countries are currently working in the department on emerging research areas.

=== Department of Electrical Engineering ===
The Department of Electrical Engineering began in 1985. The department offers two regular four-year B.Tech. programmes, first is the B.Tech. in "Electrical Engineering" and the other that started in 2024 is B.Tech. in "Electrical and Computer Engineering" with honors in Artificial Intelligence and Machine Learning. The department also provides two M.Tech. courses, M.Tech. programme in "Electrical Power System Management (EPSM)" was started in 2003–2004 and M.Tech. Programme in "Control and Instrumentation System (CIS)" started in 2012. The department also operates Ph.D. courses in five major areas:

(1) Power System,

(2) Power Electronics and Drives,

(3) Computer Technology,

(4) Control and Instrumentation, and

(5) Electronics and Communication.

=== Department of Electronics & Communication Engineering ===
The department of Electronics and Communication Engineering came into existence at the Faculty of Engineering and Technology in 1996. The department runs three undergraduate courses - B.Tech. in Electronics and Communication Engineering, B.Tech. in Electronics (VLSI Design and Technology) and B.E (evening) programme in Electronics and Communication Engineering. There are two M.Tech. Programmes are M.Tech. in Electronics and Communications and M.Tech. in Solid State Technology. Also offers Ph.D. programmes

=== Department of Mechanical Engineering ===
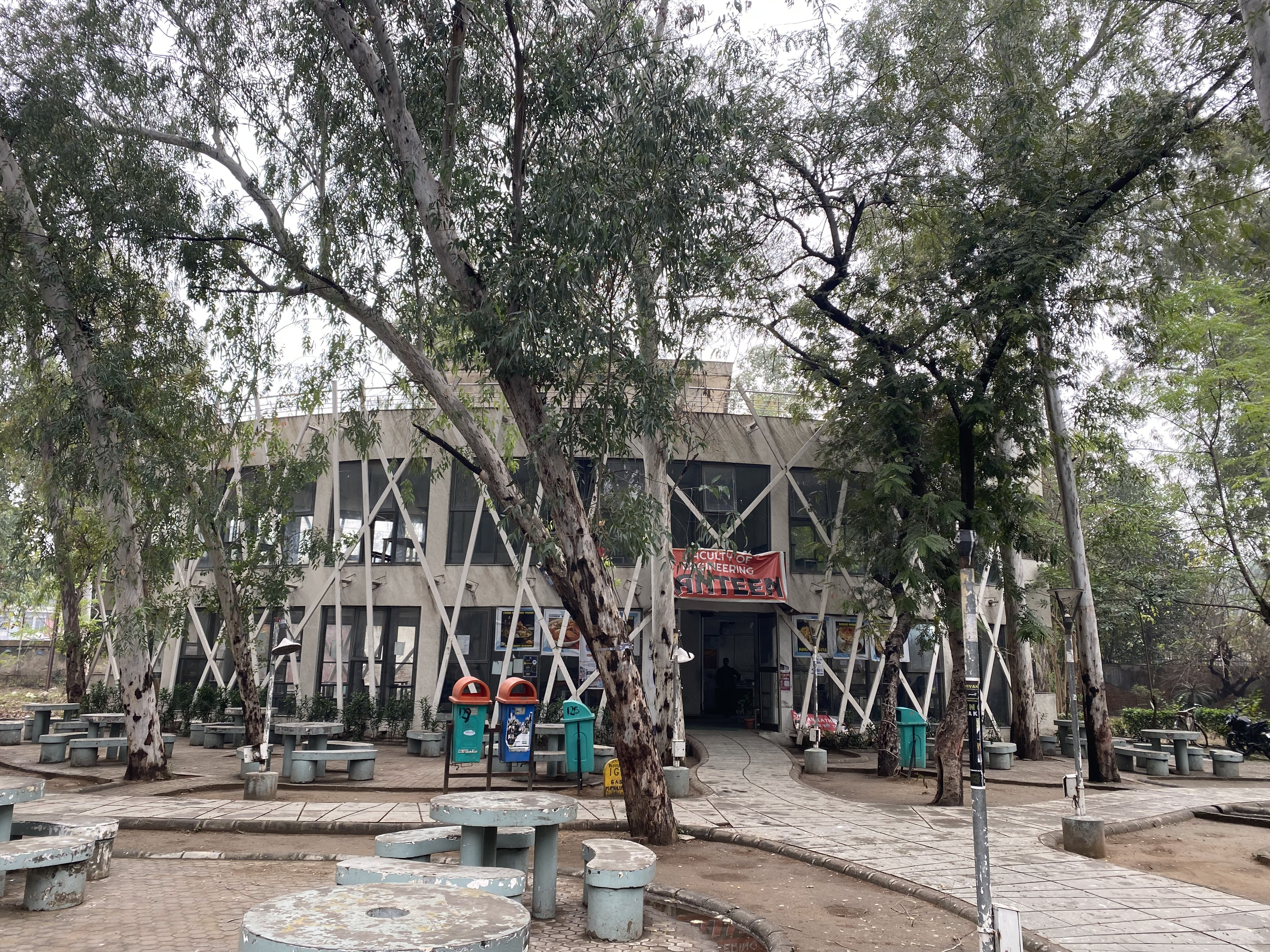
Canteen of Faculty of Engineering and Technology

The department offers eight-semester Bachelor of Technology (B.Tech.) course with an annual intake of seventy, four-semester Master of Technology (M.Tech.) course with annual intake of 18 and Doctor of Philosophy (Ph.D.) in Mechanical Engineering. M.Tech. programme is offered in three broad areas of Mechanical Engineering namely Production-Industrial Engineering, Machine Design and Thermal Engineering. The department has a student population of about 560 at UG, 40 at PG and about 44 at doctoral research levels.

=== Department of Environmental Science1 ===
In 2020, Jamia Millia Islamia founded the Department of Environmental Science, providing Master's and PhD programmes in the field. The MSc and M.Tech. programme, titled Environmental Science and Management, Environmental Health Risk and Safety Management, is complemented by a robust doctoral offering covering various environmental science specializations.

=== Aeronautics Degree ===
In 2018, Jamia Millia Islamia, in partnership with Pawan Hans Limited, introduced the BSc Aeronautics programme. This dual-degree course grants a graduation degree from Jamia Millia Islamia and a Certificate of Recognition from Pawan Hans Limited upon successful completion. Additionally, upon passing the required module exam, the DGCA will grant the basic maintenance engineer's license. As aircraft maintenance engineers (AMEs) are renowned for their high earning potential, they hold the responsibility and authority to inspect and validate aircraft for flight.

== Rankings ==
University rankings

General – international
- Times (World) (2024): 501-600

Engineering – India
- NIRF (2024): 24

Faculty was ranked 24 among engineering colleges by the National Institutional Ranking Framework (NIRF) in 2024. The London-based Times Higher Education subject ranking-2025, Faculty of Engineering JMI scaled high in Engineering and Technology improving its position to 401-500 worldwide within India its rank is 11 among all higher education institutions while among universities it is 2nd position. JMI made to list of top institutions worldwide for computer science having been placed at 301–400, while among Indian Institutions it has been ranked at 16th position and at 7th among Indian universities.

== Student activities ==
=== Festivals ===
Xtacy is the Techno-Cultural Festival organised by CSI, IEEE, SAE, ASCE hosted by FET every year.

IEEE Student Branch of JMI organizes ENCOMIUM, their annual techno-cultural festival each year. So far there have been 10 editions of ENCOMIUM.

Algorhythm is the Techno-Cultural Festival organized by Computer Society of India, Jamia Millia Islamia Student Branch CSI-JMI and Department of Computer Engineering, Jamia Millia Islamia.

Tangelo Town is the Techno-Cultural cum sports festival hosted by the Faculty of Engineering and Technology.

=== Student organisations ===
Student chapters of prominent technical societies like Computer Society of India, IEEE, Indian Society for Technical Education (ISTE), American Society of Mechanical Engineers (ASME), Society of Automotive Engineers (SAE), American Society of Civil Engineers (ASCE), Robot Society of India (TRS) are there in the faculty. Apart from Technical organisations the college also has cultural and other non-technical clubs including the likes of Literary Club, Drama Club, Debating Club, Entrepreneurship Club, Enactus Club, Social Services Club, Music Club etc.

== Notable alumni ==
- Sanjeev Aggarwal, founder of energy company Amplus Energy Solution
- Vikas Jain, co-founder of Micromax
- Sumit Kumar, co-founder of Micromax
