= Kanwal Bharti =

Indian writer (born 1953)

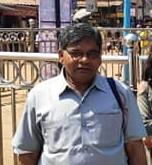
- Born: 4 February 1953 (age 73); Rampur, Uttar Pradesh
- Occupations: Writer and columnist

Kanwal Bharti (born 4 February 1953) is an Indian Dalit writer and columnist.

== Early life and education ==
Kanwal Bharti, the son of a cobbler, was born and raised in the slums of the Rampur district of Uttar Pradesh.

=== Arrest ===
Bharti was arrested on 6 August 2013 for criticizing the stand of the Government of Uttar Pradesh in the Durga Nagpal case. On 16 August 2013, the Supreme Court of India asked the Government of Uttar Pradesh to clarify their justification for Bharti's arrest.

== Books ==
- Periyar Dashan Chintan Sacchi Ramayan (2020)
- RSS Aur Bahujan Chintan (2019)
- Jati ka Vinash (2018)
- The case for Bahujan Literature (2017)
- Chandrika Prasad Jigyasu (2016)
- Kabir Ek Vishleshan (2015)
- Kashiram key do chehre (2013)
