= S. P. Singh (academic) =

Indian professor

Prof. Surendra Pratap Singh
- Citizenship: Indian
- Occupations: Academic, Professor

S. P. Singh, or Surendra Pratap Singh, is an Indian academic who served as the Vice Chancellor of Hemwati Nandan Bahuguna Garhwal University, Srinagar-Garhwal (Uttaranchal) from 10 May 2005 to 9 May 2008.

== Career ==
He is a Fellow of the Indian National Science Academy (INSA), and a Fellow of the National Academy of Sciences, India.

He is Chair of Excellence in Biodiversity and Ecology, Forest Research Institute, Dehradun, Uttarakhand, served as the Advisor, Planning Commission, Uttarakhand, the Chairman, Expert Committee of Climate Change Programme (CCP) of DST, Chairman, UGC, Review Committee for SATAT Framework for Eco-Friendly and Sustainable Campus Development in Higher Educational Institutions

== Books ==
Books he contributed to, edited include the following:

- Ecology of Himalayan Treeline Ecotone
- Interpreting mountain treelines in a changing world
- Forests of the Himalaya: Structure, Functioning, and Impact of Man, Gyanodaya Prakashan, 1992.
- Ecology, environmental science & conservation, S. Chand Publishing. 2025

== Awards and recognition ==
Some of the selected awards received by him include the following:

- Fellow of the Indian National Science Academy (INSA)
- Fellow of the National Academy of Sciences, India
- Dr. Birbal Sahni Medal (2003), Awarded by The Indian Botanical Society
