= Mahesh Verma =

Indian prosthodontist

Padma Shri (Dr.) Mahesh Verma
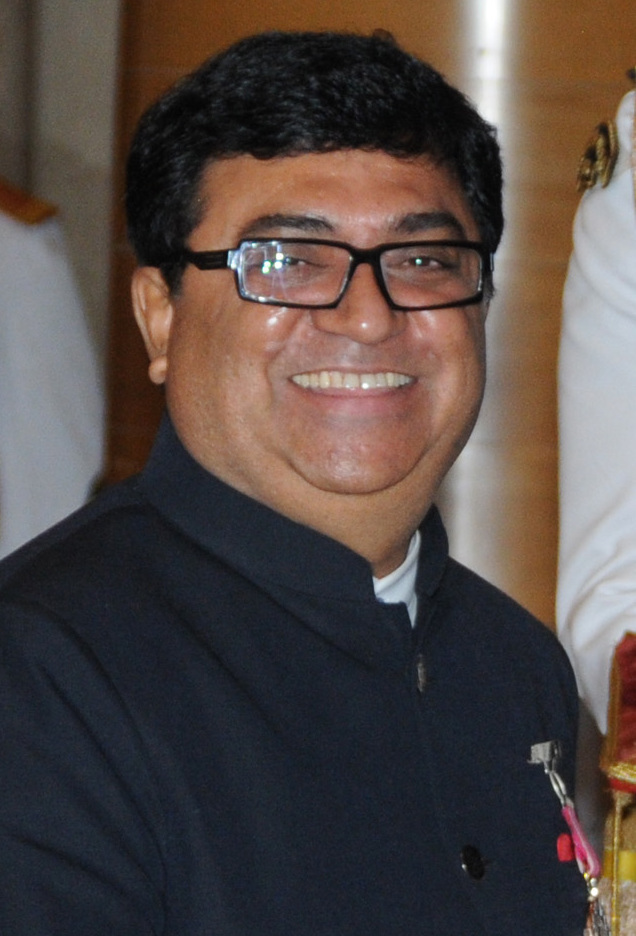
- Verma in 2014

Vice Chancellor of GGSIPU
- Incumbent
- Assumed office 1 August 2019
- Preceded by: Anil Kumar Tyagi

Personal details
- Born: India
- Occupation: Prosthodontist
- Awards: Padma Shri; Dr. B. C. Roy Award; Delhi State Award; FICCI Health Personality of the Year; Rotary Vashishat Sewa Samman; Dr. P. N. Behl Foundation Award; Dr. B. C. Shroff Oration Award; Commonwealth Dental Association Oration Award

Mahesh Verma is an Indian prosthodontist and the former Director and Principal of Maulana Azad Institute of Dental Sciences. Currently, he is the Vice Chancellor of Guru Gobind Singh Indraprastha University. The Government of India awarded him, in 2014, with the Padma Shri, the fourth highest civilian award, for his contributions to the fields of medicine,

== Biography ==
Verma graduated with a degree in dentistry (BDS) from the Government Medical College, Thiruvananthapuram and secured his master's degree (MDS) from the same institution, specializing in prosthodontics. He joined the Institute of Dental Sciences of Maulana Azad Medical College and became the Head of the institute in 1995. He also underwent advanced training in prosthodontics at the State University of New York, Buffalo and later earned an MBA from the Faculty of Management Studies (FMS), University of Delhi. He is the incumbent Director-Principal of Maulana Azad Institute of Dental Sciences (MAIDS), the dental wing of Maulana Azad Medical College, New Delhi.

Verma helped to develop MAIDS from a dental school of meagre proportions into a Centre of Excellence with a daily count of over 1200 inpatients. An Outlook - Marketing and Development Research Associates (MDRA) survey of premier Indian dental schools placed MAIDS as the best dental school in India. MAIDS have either stood first or has been placed at the top in a few other surveys.

A World Health Organization (WHO) fellow, Verma teaches healthcare management at the FMS, Delhi University. He is involved in WHO social and community projects as well as institutional projects of the Council of Scientific and Industrial Research (CSIR), Indian Council of Medical Research (ICMR). One of his projects is the development of indigenous dental implants involving Indian Institute of Technology and the CSIR, funded by the Ministry of Science and Technology.

== Positions ==
Verma has been involved in professional and academic organizations. He is the President of the Delhi unit of the Indian Dental Association. the India and Sri Lanka chapter of the International College of Dentists and the Indian Academy of Restorative Dentistry (IARD). He was the vice president of the Dental Council of India, former president of the Indian Prosthodontic Society and the former Vice President of the Indian Academy of Dental Educationists and the Indian Society for Dental Research (ISDR)

He also holds the position of the registrar of the Delhi Dental Council. He serves as honorary advisor to the Armed Forces Dental Services, Ministry of Defence and as international advisor to the Royal College of Physicians and Surgeons of Glasgow (UK).

Verma has been the organizing secretary of two events, the World Congress on Prosthodontics, held in 1995 at Delhi and the conference of the Commonwealth Dental Association and Indian Dental Association at Delhi in 2000. He was also the chairman of the event FDI 2014 He has served on the editorial boards of the Journal of American Dental Association (Indian Edition) and the Journal of British Dental Association (Indian Edition). He is the Executive Editor of the India and Sri Lanka sections of the Journal of International College of Dentists and the editor of Dentistry, a Springer publication. He also serves as the clinical director of the American Academy of Implant Dentistry (AAID).

== Awards and recognitions ==
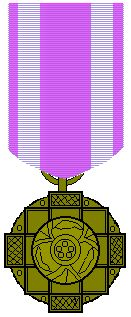
Padma Shri India

Verma received the State Award from the Government of Delhi in 2001, the B. C. Roy Award in 2007, and the civilian award of Padma Shri in 2014, when he was included in the Republic Day honours. He was the Health Personality of the Year for 2012, an honour from the Federation of Indian Chambers of Commerce and Industry (FICCI). He is also a recipient of Rotary Vashishat Sewa Samman in 2002, Dr. P. N. Behl Foundation Award of the Delhi Medical Association in 2006, Dr. B. C. Shroff Oration Award of the Indian Prosthodontic Society Annual Conference in 2007, Commendation by the Vice Chief of Army Staff in 2009 and Commonwealth Dental Association Oration Award in 2010.

He has been designated a fellow of several organizations, including the American College Of Dentists, the International College of Dentists, the Pierre Fauchard Academy, the American Academy of Implant Dentistry, the National Academy of Medical Sciences, the International Medical Sciences Academy, the Royal College of Surgeons of England, the Royal College of Physicians and Surgeons of Glasgow and the Royal College of Surgeons, Faculty of General Dentistry Practice.
