= Maharaja Surajmal Institute of Technology =

Institute in New Delhi, India

Coordinates: 28.6206°N 77.0924°E

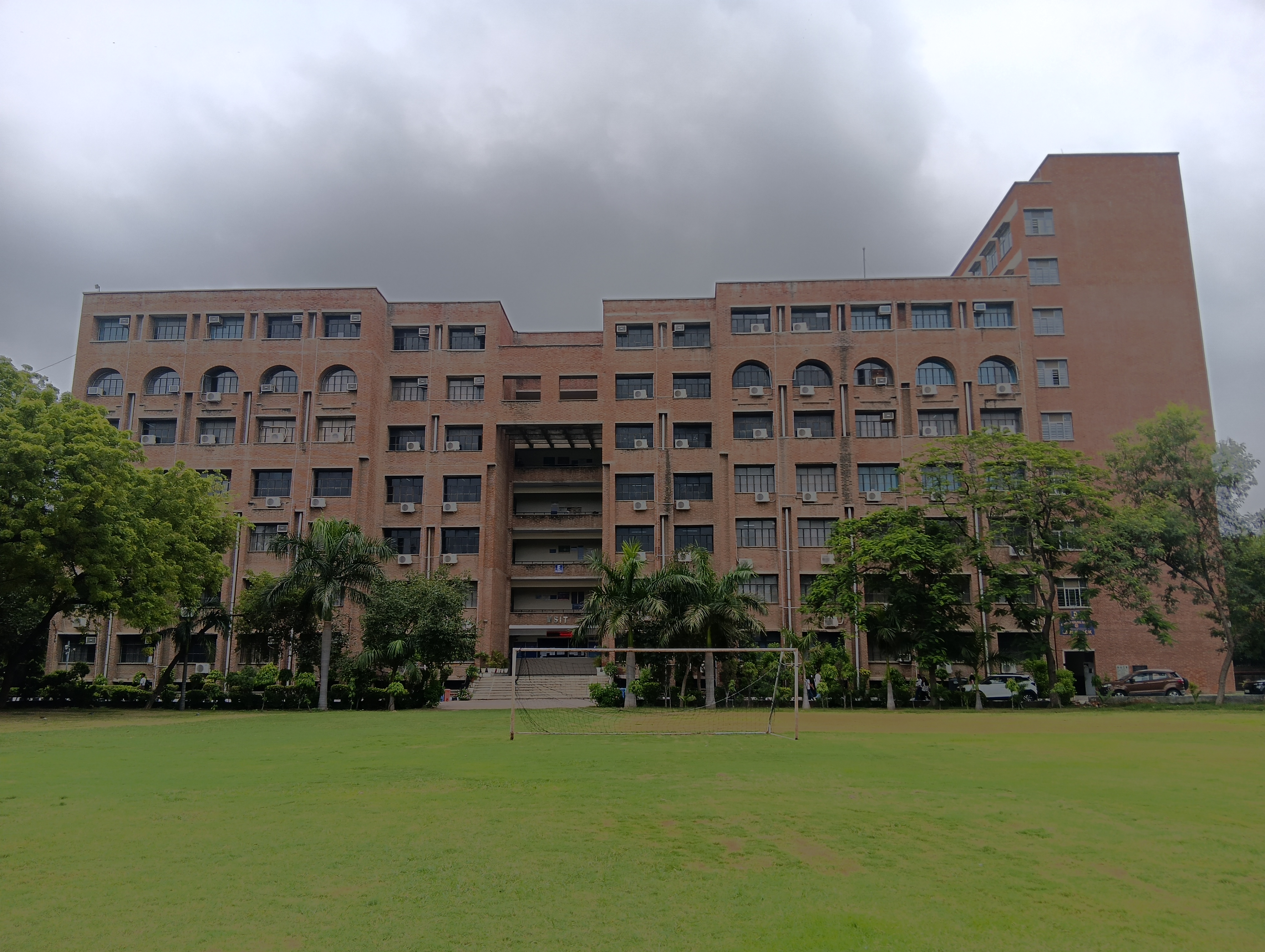
- Type: Private
- Established: 1999; 27 years ago
- Affiliations: GGSIPU
- Director: K. P. Chaudhary
- Location: New Delhi, Delhi, India
- Campus: Urban
- Website: msit.in

Maharaja Surajmal Institute of Technology is a private engineering college located in Janakpuri, Delhi. The college is affiliated to Guru Gobind Singh Indraprastha University.

== Administration ==
Maharaja Surajmal Institute is a self-financing private institute. The governing body of the institutes (MSI, MSIP and MSIT) is Surajmal Memorial Educational Society (SMES).

== Recognition ==
The Institute is affiliated with G.G.S.I.P. University, New Delhi. ECE, CSE, IT and EEE Department have NBA Accreditation.

== Rankings ==
The National Institutional Ranking Framework (NIRF) ranked the university between 201-300 in the engineering rankings in 2024.

University rankings

Engineering – India
- NIRF (2024): 201-300

== See also ==
- Maharaja Suraj Mal
- Maharaja Surajmal Institute
