= University School of Law and Legal Studies =

Constituent schools of Guru Gobind Singh Indraprastha University in India

University School of Law & Legal Studies (USLLS)
- Motto: ज्योतिर्वृणीत तमसो विजानन्
- Type: Public
- Established: 2001; 25 years ago
- Affiliations: UGC
- Academic affiliations: Guru Gobind Singh Indraprastha University
- Dean: Shivani Goswami
- Students: 700 (BA+BBA LLB)
- Undergraduates: 630
- Postgraduates: 40
- Doctoral students: 30
- Location: Dwarka, Delhi, India; 28.5947°N 77.0189°E
- Campus: Urban 60 acres (24 ha)
- Website: www.ipu.ac.in/uslls

University School of Law & Legal Studies (formerly known as Delhi School of Law) is one of the constituent schools of Guru Gobind Singh Indraprastha University. Established in 2001, it is an institution dedicated to law and was the first state government law school in Delhi. It is constantly rated in the top 15 government law schools in India offering a 5-year course. It is also rated in the top five law schools in Delhi NCR. The acceptance rate of USLLS is incredibly low, given the fewer seats and large number of applicants. USLLS was also ranked 12 in the National Institutional Ranking Framework, Ministry of Education, Government of India (law category).

== History ==
Established in 2001, the objective of University School of Law and Legal Studies was to run a Five Year Integrated Professional Law Course and to serve as an institution of advanced legal studies. It was the first University Law School established in the vicinity of the Supreme Court, Delhi High Court, various subordinate courts, commissions, tribunals and various monitoring offices of national and international voluntary organizations.

Earlier located at Kashmere Gate, the college shifted to new 65 acre Dwarka campus and now has state of the art infrastructure shared by other colleges inside the main campus of the university.

== Programmes offered ==
School offers the following programmes, in the field of Law and Legal Studies:

- B.A., LL.B. (H) Five Year Course

Duration: 05 years (Ten Semesters - Regular teaching in nine semesters and Dissertation in the tenth semester)

- B.B.A., LL.B. (H) Five Year Course

Duration: 05 years (Ten Semesters - Regular teaching in nine semesters and Dissertation in the tenth semester)

- Master of Laws (LL.M.) Regular Course

Duration: 02 years (Four Semesters - Regular teaching in three semesters and Dissertation in the fourth semester)

The college offers the LL.M. programme for the following fields of specialization:

1. Corporate Law
2. Human Rights Law
3. Intellectual Property Rights
4. International Trade Law
5. Alternative Dispute Redressal (ADR)

Foreign Students: Some percentage of seats are reserved for foreign students in the University School in both graduate and post graduate programmes.

- Master of Laws (LL.M.) Weekend Course

Duration: 02 years (Four Semesters - Regular teaching in three semesters and Dissertation in the fourth semester)

Intake: 20 + 20 seats

Selection Pattern: Admission through Interview.

The LL.M. programme in the following fields of specialization:

Industrial and Intellectual Property Law

Cyber Law and Cyber Crimes

- Ph.D.

The school offers Ph.D. programme in various disciplines of law.

The law school offered modular LL.B(Hons.) from 2001 to 2004 Batches. From 2005 to 2013 Batches its offered B.A., LL.B (Hons.). From 2014 onwards, the law school offers B.A. LL.B (Integrated).

== Seat matrix ==
- B.A. LLB (5 Year Integrated) : Total seats are 61 = 26 (General-Delhi) + 5 (only for General category Outside Delhi) + 27 (Reserved Seats)
- BBA LLB (5 Year Integrated) Total seats are 40 = 20 (General-Delhi) + 3 (General - Outside Delhi) + 17 (Reserved Seats)

Reserved Categories are SC, ST, OBC, DEF, PH, KM

== Admission ==
Admissions for the five year integrated LL.B.(H) course are made on the basis of merit, which is evaluated by the 'Common Entrance Test' of Guru Gobind Singh Indraprastha University - commonly knows as the CET. USLLS has a small batch of not more than 60 students, most of whom procure an all India rank of under 60 in CET.

As of 2019 and onwards, The admission to USLLS will based on Common Law Admission Test marks rather than CET. (which will no longer be conducted).

== Alumni Association of University School of Law and Legal Studies ==
The law school has an alumni association having a network of more than 1200 alumni across the world.

The Alumni Association of the University School of Law and Legal Studies, GGSIPU traces its origins back to year 2006 when it was first formulated with the teachers of the Institute serving as its office bearers. Being an Institute in its nascent stage, the need for an effective Alumni Association was realised when the first batch of the institute was about to graduate. It is a registered society under The Societies Registration Act, 1860.

The Alumni Association of USLLS governing body consists of Secretary, Treasurer and five executive members. The current body was elected in November, 2025. The following are the current office bearers of the Association:-

- Ritu Rajkumari - Secretary
- Chitra Gupt Dagar - Treasurer
- Nomita Rana - Executive Member
- Adya Shree Dutta - Executive Member
- Vinayak Pant - Executive Member
- Sakshi Bhayana - Executive Member
- Siddhant Soti - Executive Member

The Alumni Association regularly conducts networking events among the alumni.

== See also ==
- Education in Delhi
