= Guru Gobind Singh Indraprastha University =

Public state university in Delhi, India

- Other name: GGSIPU
- Former name: Indraprastha University
- Motto: Jyotivṛṇīta Tamaso Vijānan
- Motto in English: Light of intelligence cleaves the darkness
- Type: Public
- Established: 1998; 28 years ago
- Affiliations: ACU, AIU, UGC, NAAC
- Chancellor: Lieutenant Governor of Delhi
- Vice-Chancellor: Mahesh Verma
- Location: Dwarka, Delhi, India; 28.595016°N 77.018942°E
- Campus: Urban (78 acres)
- Colours: Maroon and Blue
- Website: ipu.ac.in
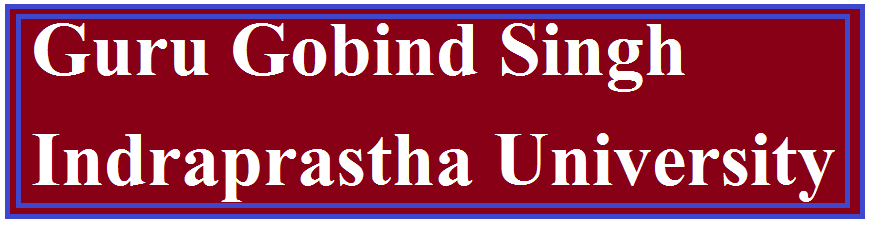

The Guru Gobind Singh Indraprastha University, formerly Indraprastha University (IP or IPU), is a state university located in Sector 16 Dwarka, Delhi, India. The university is organised around fourteen university schools and three university centers that focus on programs in law, medicine, technology, education, entrepreneurship, science and business.

== History ==
Guru Gobind Singh Indraprastha University was established as Indraprastha University (IPU) on 28 March 1998 by the Govt. of NCT Delhi as a state university under the provisions of Guru Gobind Singh Indraprastha University Act, 1998 with its Amendment in 1999. The university is recognised by University Grants Commission (India), under section 12B of the UGC Act. The university was named after the ancient city of Indraprastha, which features prominently in the epic Mahabharata. In 2001, the university was officially renamed as Guru Gobind Singh Indraprastha University (GGSIPU) after Guru Gobind Singh.

== Organisation and administration ==
The university has 14 university schools (colleges of the university), 12 of them are on the campus in Dwarka and 2 schools, USAR and USDI are on the new East Delhi campus. There are 4 centers within the university for research in Disaster Management Studies, Pharmaceutical Sciences (CEPS), Human Values & Ethics and a center for Incubation-cum-Technology Commercialization (UCITC). Three of these centers are in the campus in Dwarka while UCITC is in the East Delhi campus.

=== University schools ===
Guru Gobind Singh Indraprastha University has 14 university schools (colleges), 12 of them are on the main campus in Dwarka and 2 colleges, USAR and USDI are on the new campus at East Delhi.

- University School of Architecture and Planning
- University School of Automation and Robotics
- University School of Basic & Applied Sciences
- University School of Biotechnology
- University School of Chemical Technology
- University School of Design & Innovation
- University School of Environment Management
- University School of Humanities & Social Sciences
- University School of Information and Communication Technology
- University School of Law and Legal Studies
- University School of Management Studies
- University School of Mass Communication
- University School of Medicine and Para-Medical Health Sciences

=== Affiliated colleges ===
There are more than 120 affiliates of the university, which are run according to the rules and regulations set by the university.

== Academics ==
=== World ranking ===
The University is ranked 1001-1200 in the QS rankings 2025.

=== Ranking ===
University rankings

General – India
- NIRF (Overall) (2023): 101-150
- NIRF (Universities) (2023): 74

Engineering – India
- NIRF (2024): 89

Medical – India
- NIRF (2023): 66

Law – India
- NIRF (2024): 17

Business/Management – India
- NIRF (2024): 65

Architecture – India
- NIRF (2024): 29

The university was ranked 66 among Indian universities by the National Institutional Ranking Framework (NIRF) in 2019 and 95 in the overall category. The University School of Engineering & Technology was ranked 73 by NIRF engineering ranking and the University School of Management Studies was ranked 62 in the management ranking.

The QS World University Rankings ranked the university 320th in Asia in 2025.

== Notable alumni ==
- Gaurav Gogoi
- Mohamed Irfaan Ali
- Guneet Monga
- Taapsee Pannu
- Manish Singh
- Puneet Beniwal
- Bharat Kundra

== See also ==
- Education in Delhi
- University Grants Commission (India)
