= DDA International Sports Complex =

Dwarka Sports Complex
- Country: India
- City: Delhi
- District: Dwarka
- Time zone: UTC +5:30

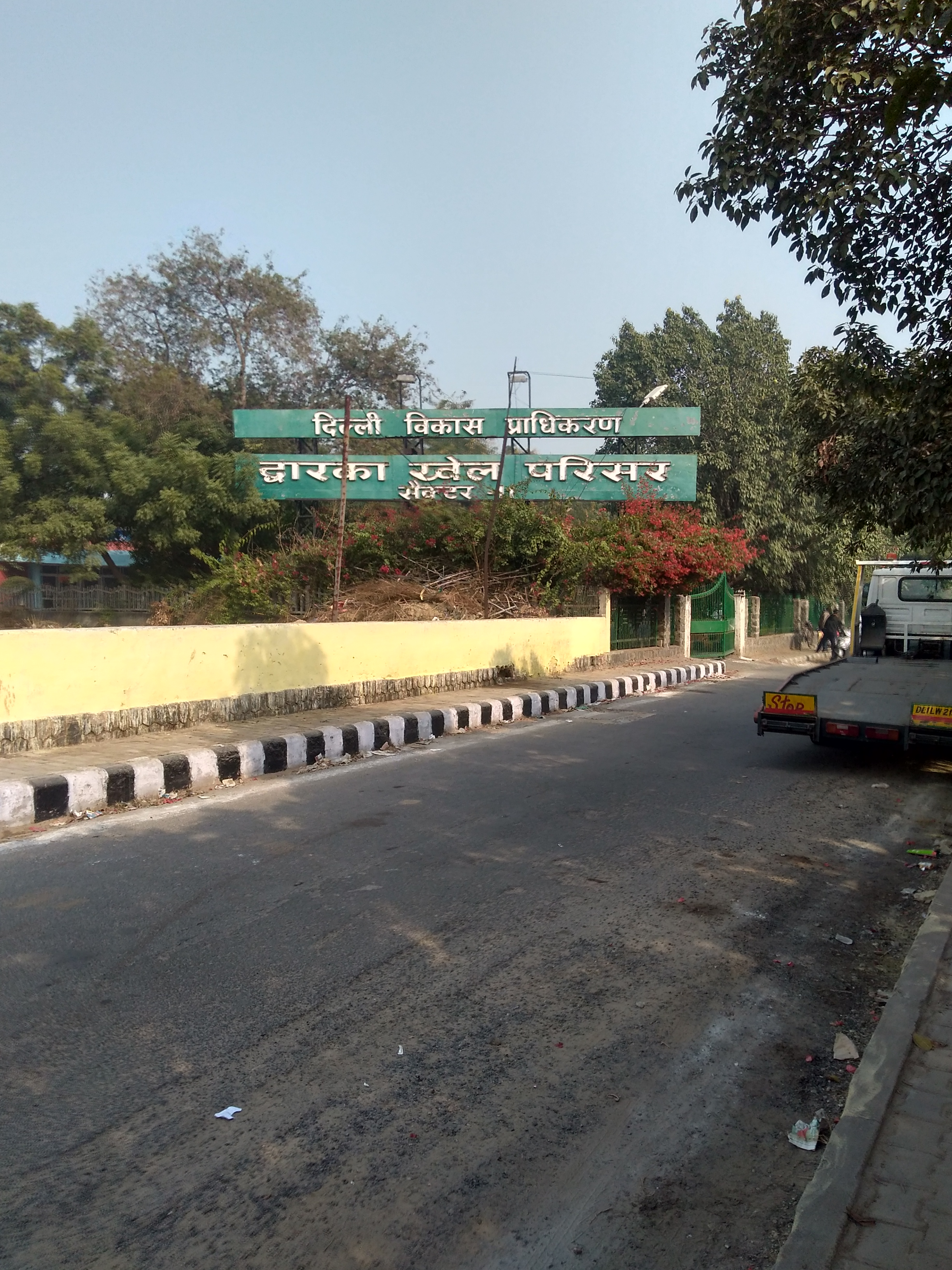
DDA Sports Complex, Dwarka Sector 11

The Dwarka Sports Complex (officially DDA International Sports Complex) is a proposed sporting complex which will be based in Dwarka, Delhi. Being planned by the Delhi Development Authority, the complex will house an 18,000 seater international football stadium, an athletic stadium, as well as a Gymkhana and outdoor sports complex.

The complex will be located next to the house of the All India Football Federation and 3 kilometres from the Indira Gandhi International Airport. The complex was first planned in 2011 but due to the original plan not being up to international standards was revised. An international standard football stadium with a capacity of 18,000, a stadium for athletic events, a gymkhana club and an outdoor sports complex are in the works for Dwarka sub-city. In an effort to provide a sports and recreation destination for the entire city, the project is being undertaken by the Delhi Development Authority (DDA) on a 62-acre site in Sector 19. "The idea is to provide an iconic sports and community facility that reflects the spirit of football as a sport. This way, the facility will be utilised year-round and can provide support to schools and educational institutions for their sporting needs and programmes", DDA vice-chairman Balwinder Kumar said.

The site is situated next to the All India Football Federation. It is just 3 km from the Indira Gandhi International Airport (IGIA) and can be approached from the Sector 9 and Sector 10 Metro stations as well. The project was conceptualized four years ago and was revised to suit international standards.

Officials said the project now meets the standards of an environmentally-friendly design. DDA official said the complex will comprise a full practice field and four mini fields, VIP and media facilities, an eight-lane artificial athletics track, four badminton courts, three squash courts, and facilities for billiards, boxing and martial arts. The complex will also have a fitness and yoga centre, indoor and outdoor swimming pools, outdoor fields, 12 tennis courts, basketball and volleyball courts and skate parks.

Additionally, the project will also provide a full and half hockey fields and parking area with a capacity of 700. "The stadium will have an optimum seating bowl to create a unique atmosphere that enhances the spectator experience. Since the project is still at the conception stage, we are yet to finalise the cost and the time frame within which it will be completed", a senior DDA official said.
