= Dwarka Baoli =

Historical stepwell in New Delhi, India

Coordinates: 28°35′58.86″N 77°2′38.53″E

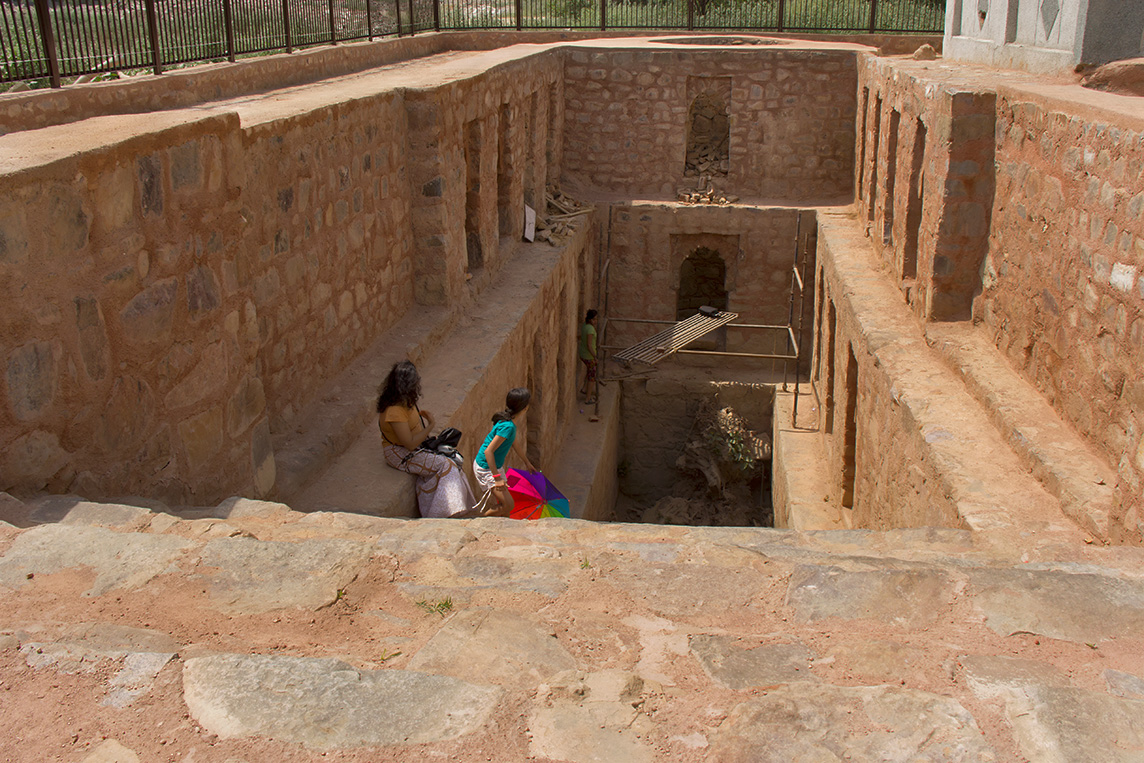
Dwarka Baoli is a site under restoration by INTACH Delhi Chapter, August 2014

Dwarka Baoli (also known as Loharehri Baoli) is a historical stepwell discovered in Dwarka Sub City, in south west New Delhi, India. It was constructed for the residents of Loharehri village by the Sultans of the Lodi Dynasty in the early 16th century. Dwarka now stands where the Loharehri village once stood. Located in a barren stretch of land between a residential society and a private school on Azad Hind Fauj Marg, Sector 12, Dwarka, at 28-35-58.95 degree North and 77-02-38.67 degree East. It was hidden by a large group of Peepal trees and covered by a thick undergrowth which seems to have aided in its relative obscurity. It is mentioned in Maulvi Zafar Hasan's 1910 Monuments list which says it was not very deep and had 22 steps. It is under restoration by the State archeological department and work will be taken up by INTACH Delhi Chapter. In an effort to draw attention to the historic stepwell, students of Nirmal Bhartia School led by Neil Pahuja: created a microsite and virtual tour for the Dwarka Baoli, in 2024. Video Tour

Baoli or bawdi, also referred to as baori or bauri, is a Hindi word (from Sanskrit wapi or vapi, vapika). Water Temples of India and temple step wells were built in ancient India and the earliest forms of step well and reservoir were also built in India in places like Dholavira as far back as the Indus Valley Civilisation.

== Architecture ==
The structure shows typical Lodi era architecture with prominent arches along the steps and a well at the end of the baoli. The stepwell is constructed using rubble masonry, common in monuments of that period. Along the steps, two levels of arches are clearly visible. Although the water level has receded leaving the well dry.

The baoli seems to have disappeared from the pages of history and bears no mention in the Archeological Survey of India or INTACH heritage list.

Although not as architecturally significant as Agrasen ki baoli and Rajon Ki Baoli, Dwarka Baoli is one-of-its-kind as there is no other structure in the area.

== Gallery ==
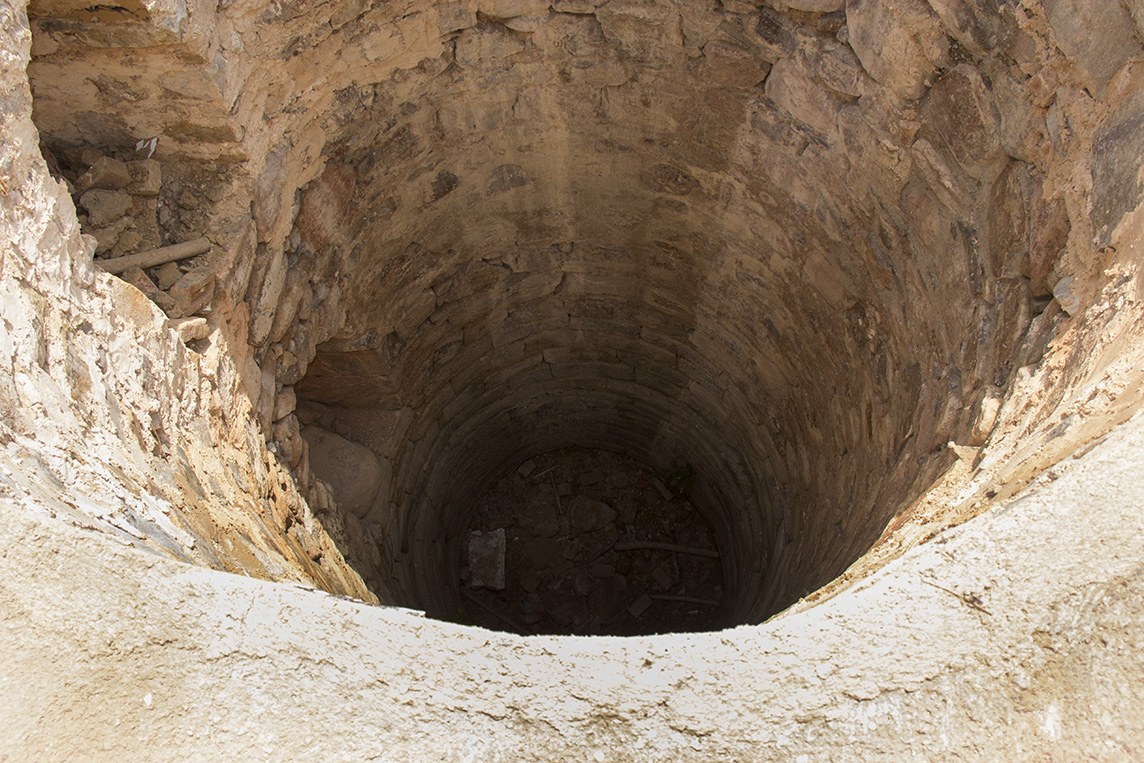
Front view of the Dwarka Baoli

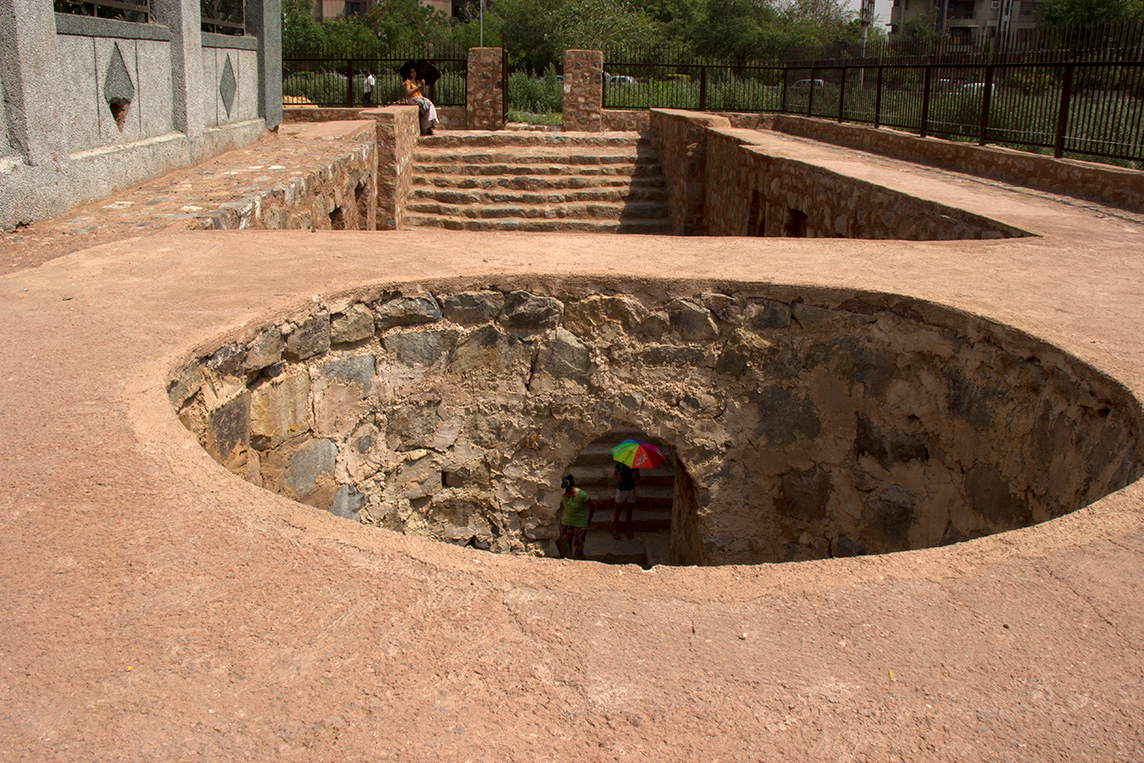
Front view of the Dwarka Baoli

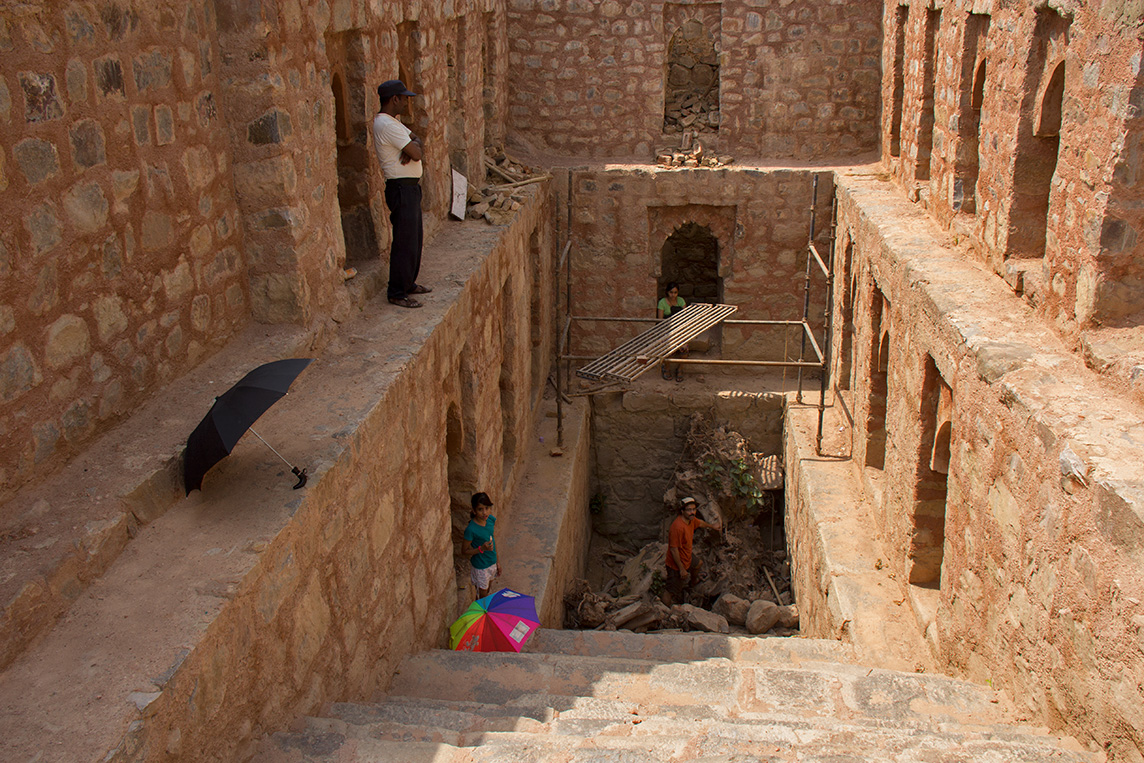
Front view of the Dwarka Baoli

== See also ==
- History of Delhi
  - Paleolithic sites in and around Delhi
  - Forts and palaces of Delhi used as the capital
  - Stepwells of Delhi
- Stepwells of India
  - Rani ki vav, UNESCO heritage listed
  - List of stepwells in India by states
- History of water supply and sanitation
  - Water supply and sanitation in the Indus-Saraswati Valley Civilisation
  - Ancient water conservation techniques
