= Baolis of Mehrauli =

Medieval stepwells in Delhi, India

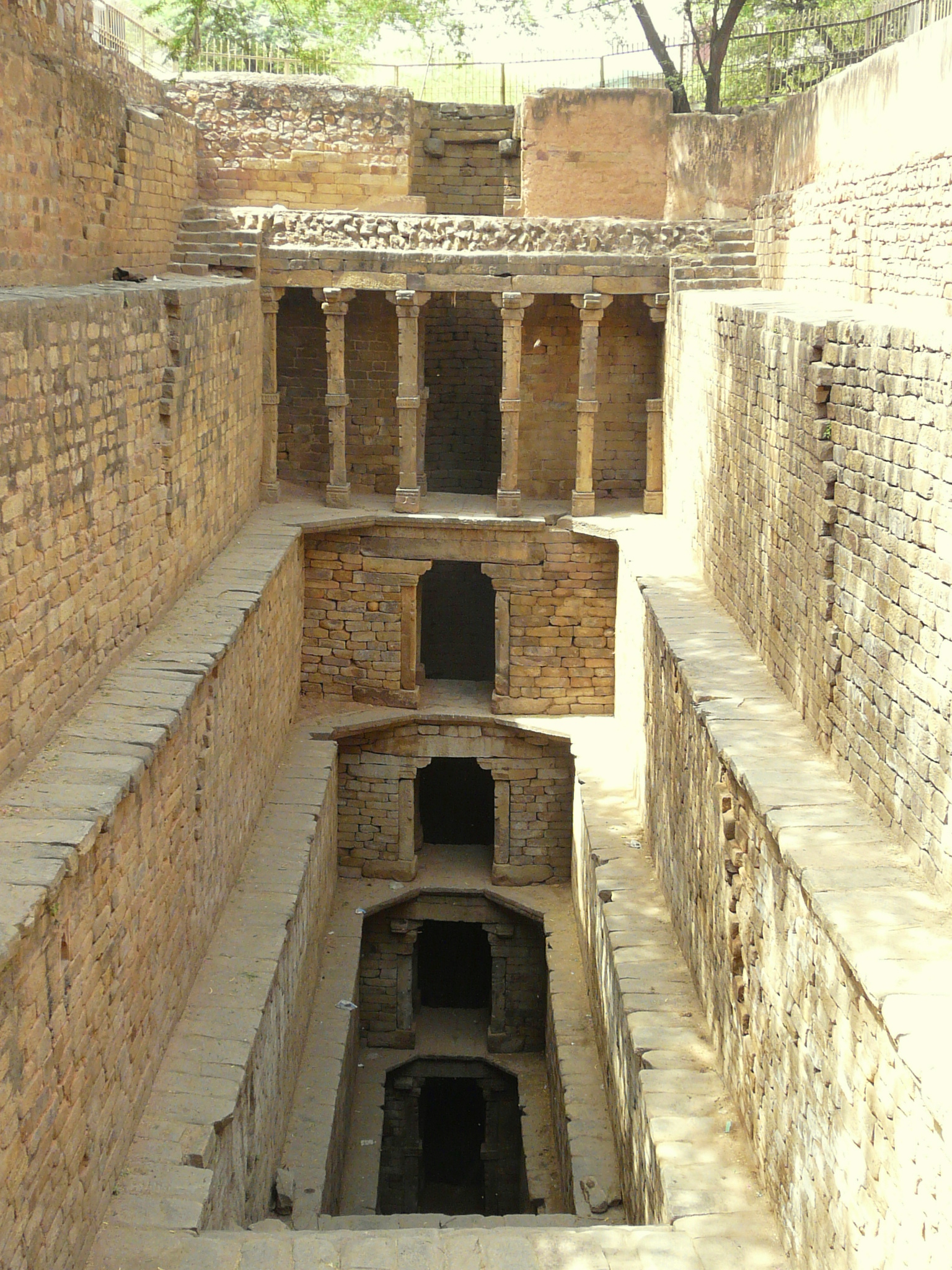
Gandhak Ki Baoli, built by Sultan Iltutmish in the early 13th century. It is one of the three baolis in Mehrauli.

The Baolis of Mehrauli are four stepwells approached through single stage or three stage steps, located in Mehrauli in Delhi, India, in the Mehrauli Archaeological Park mainlined by the Archaeological Survey of India. These are the Anangtal Baoli, the Gandhak Ki Baoli, and the Rajon Ki Baoli. These were built below the ground level as ground water edifices and were built near shrines in medieval times.

== Location ==
The baolis in Mehrauli are located in the South district of Delhi. Two of the baolis, Gandhak ki Baoli and Rajon ki Baoli, lie in the Archaeological Park maintained by the Archaeological Survey of India near Qutab Minar. Gandhak ki Baoli (to the south of Adham Khan's tomb) is at one extremity of the Archaeological Park. Rajon ki Baoli is 200 metres (660 ft) away from this baoli. Anangtal Baoli is in a forest 100 meters (330 ft) west of the Yogmaya Mandir, behind a neighborhood, and outside of the Archaeological Park complex. While the baoli built by Emperor Aurangzeb near Zafar Mahal was illegally occupied and destroyed by locals to make residential houses.

== History ==
The oldest of the three baolis, Anangtal Baoli, was built in the 11th century (1060 AD) by king Anangpal II of the Tomar dynasty in the then capital area of Lalkot of Delhi. Gandhak ki Baoli is believed to have been built during the 13th century when the slave dynasty of the Delhi Sultanate Iltutmish (1211–1236 AD) ruled over Delhi. The Rajon ki Baoli is named after the rajmistries or masons who used it. It was built during the 16th century, by Daulat Khan during the rule of Sikander Lodhi of the Lodhi Dynasty. The Baoli of Aurangzeb was built by Emperor Aurangzeb. It measured 130 feet by 36 feet while the well was 30 feet in diameter, it contained 74 steps and was built in three stage. The Baoli was illegally demolished by local residents to make way for residential apartments. The area of the Baoli is now an uphill road with rows of homes, shops and warehouses on each side.

== Features ==
=== Anangtal Baoli ===
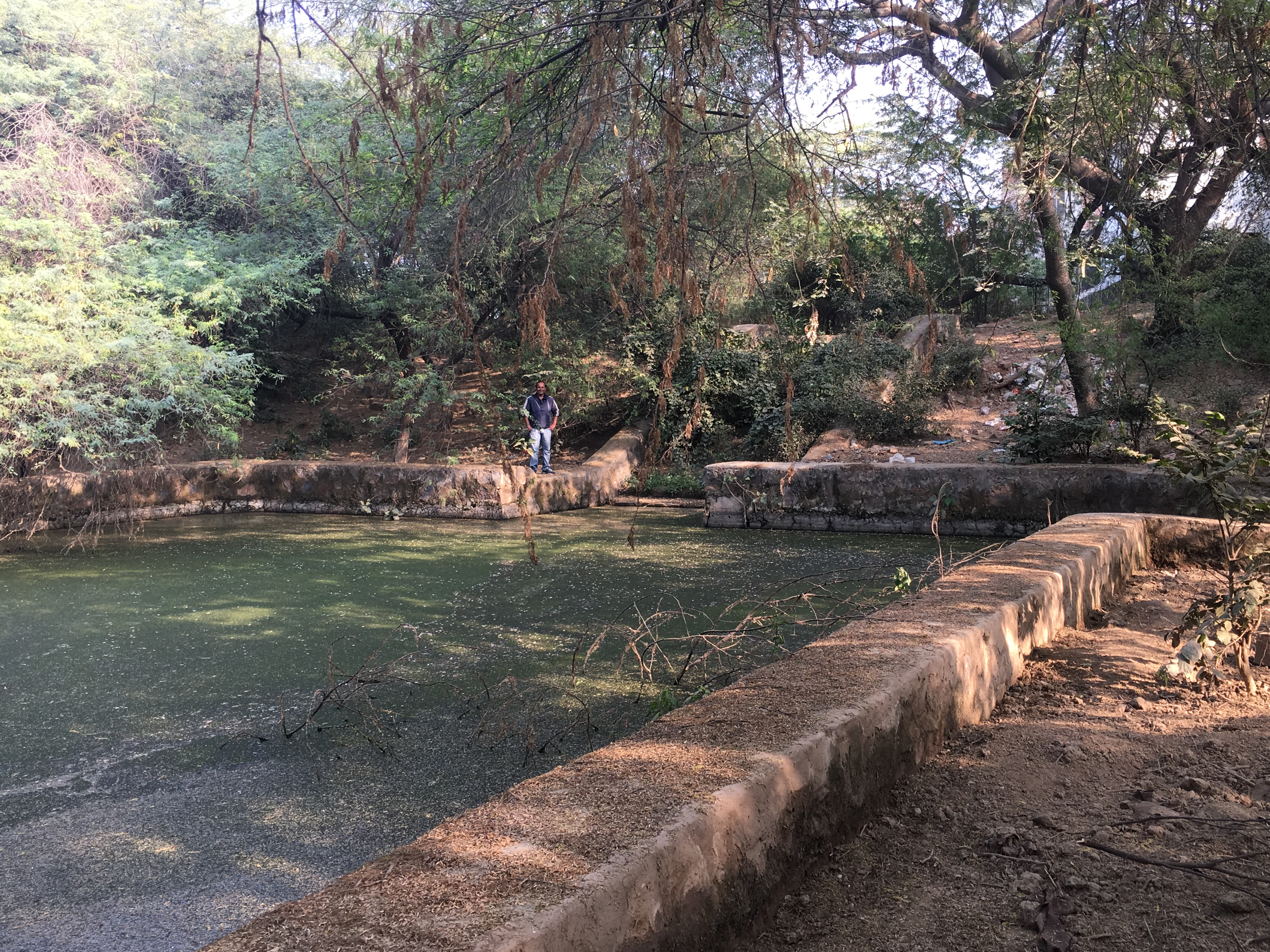
Anangtal Baoli in December 2018

The Anangtal Baoli (28°31'31.7"N 77°10'53.8"E), the oldest baoli in Delhi, is a single stage step well, built by the Tomara dynasty ruler Anangpal II (r.c.1051 – c.1081). Anangpal II was instrumental in populating Indraprastha and giving it its present name, Delhi. The region was in ruins when he ascended the throne in the 11th century, it was he who built Lal Kot fort and Anangtal Baoli. The Tomar rule over the region is attested by multiple inscriptions and coins, and their ancestry can be traced to the Pandavas (of the Mahabharata)" said BR Mani, former joint director-general of the Archaeological Survey of India (ASI).

Excavations at this site reveal that the well was probably very large; some steps leading to the water are extant. It used the technique of rainwater harvesting for its storage. The baoli is located in a forest behind a neighborhood and is used as a local waste dump and pig farm, with sewage running into it. While it was supposed to be maintained by the Delhi Development Authority (DDA), the Delhi High Court ordered that the Yogmaya Mandir Welfare and Management Society take over, since the DDA was failing in its duties. As of 8 December 2018, the baoli is not maintained and does not have any markers signifying its historical relevance.

On 27 June 2022 Lieutenant Governor (LG) Vinai Kumar Saxena directed officials to redevelop Anangtal Baoli within two months to restore Delhi's lost and abandoned heritage. LG Saxena emphasised that the restoration work must be appropriately done, preserving the structure's heritage identity, especially its hidden aspects.

=== Gandhak ki Baoli ===
Gandhak ki Baoli

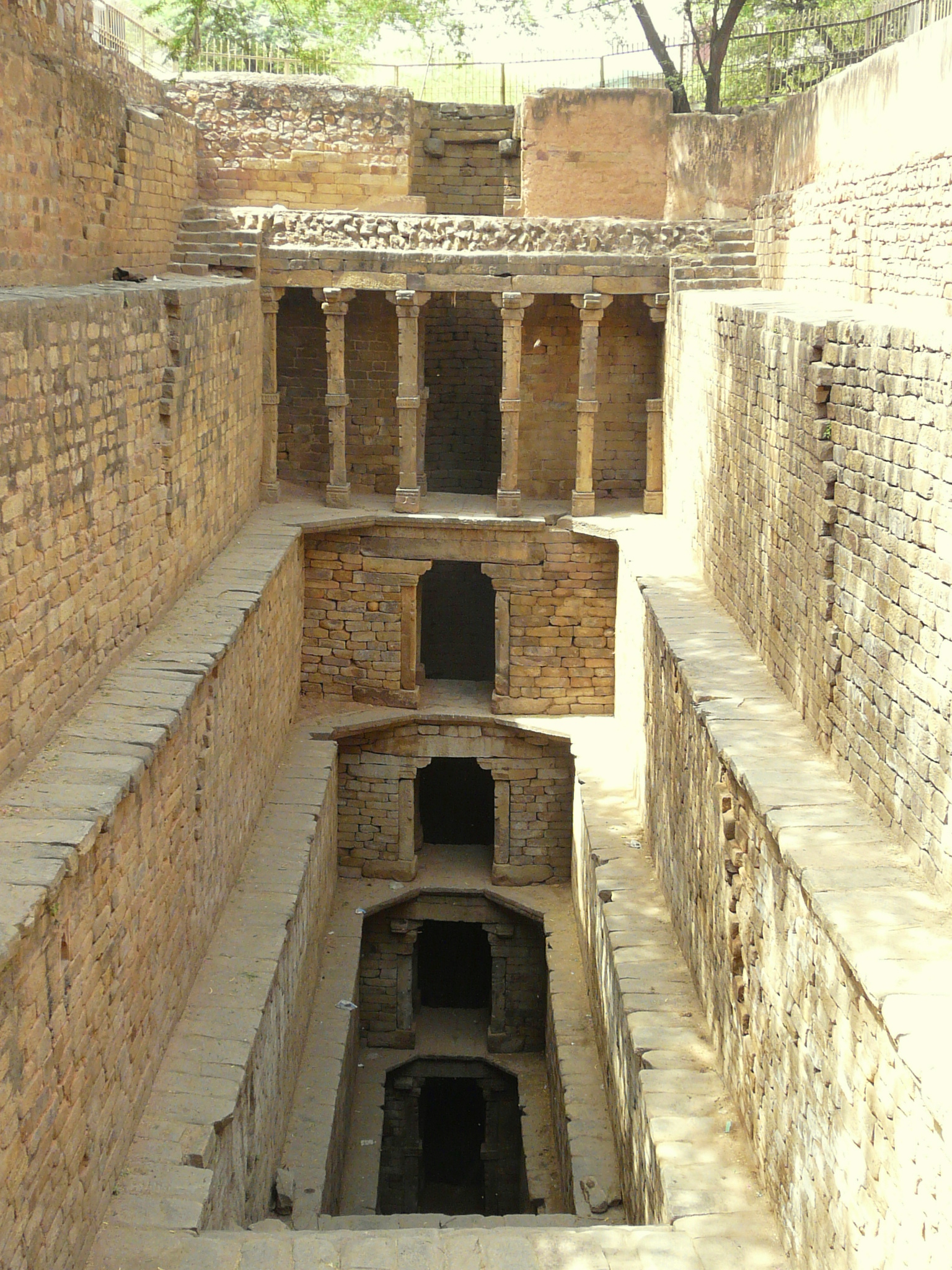
Empty

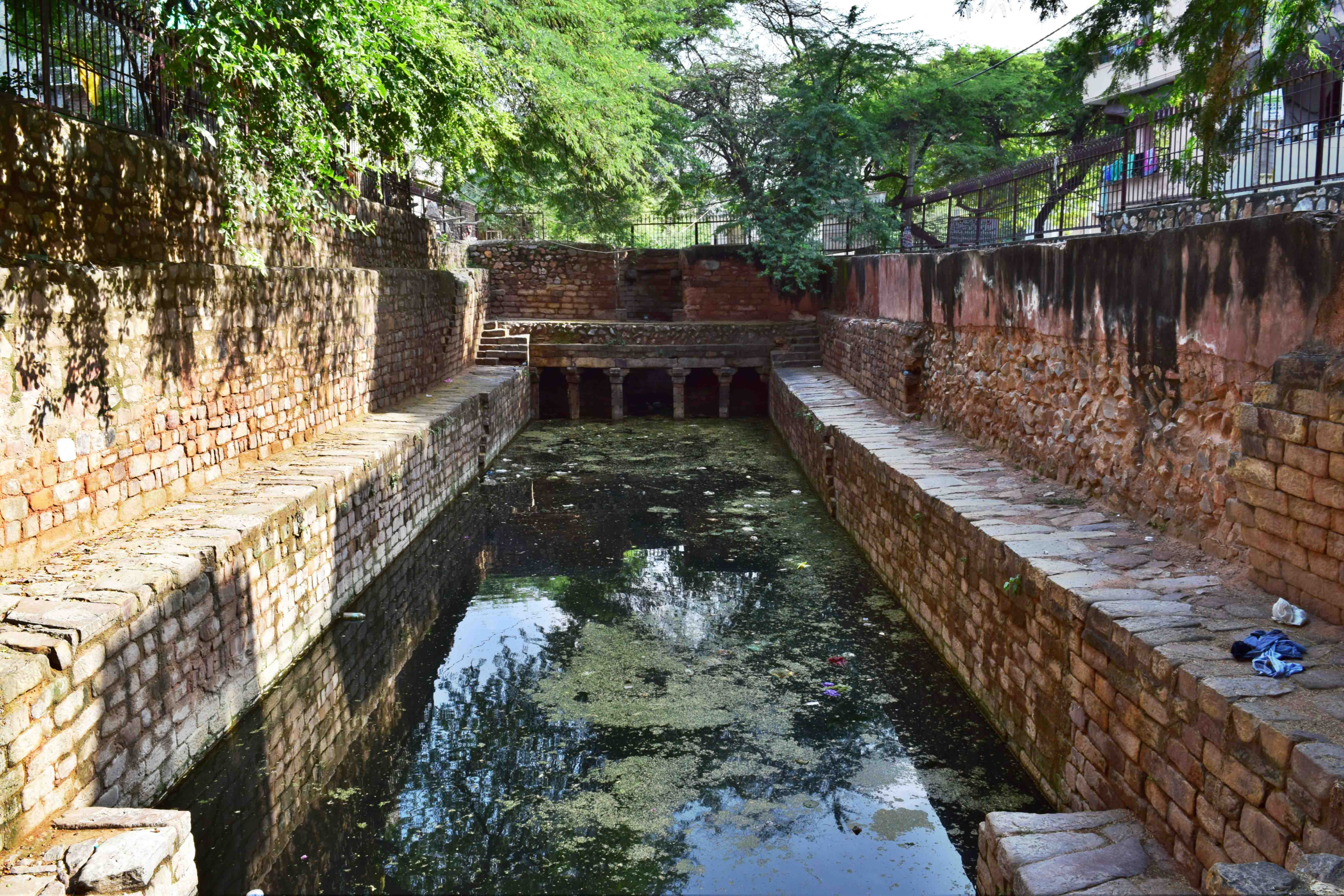
Filled with water

The Gandhak ki Baoli (28°31′15″N 77°10′54″E) is a much larger step well than the Anangtal Baoli. It was built by Sultan Iltutmish in the early 13th century. It has decorative architectural features. As the name Gandhak implies, the water in the step well has sulphur content and hence smells of sulphur fumes, and the water is said to have curative quality. It has a simple plan with five stages or floors at each stage, in taper down fashion, with steps leading to the water surface at the lowest level. The stairway here is about 40 metres (130 ft) long and 12 metres (39 ft) wide. On each floor there are ornate pillared passages. Over the centuries the step well got silted up and recently ASI imitated action to do desilting. the desilting operations carried out by ASI in 2004–05 has resulted in recuperation of the water in the well to a depth of 40 feet (12 m).

=== Rajon ki Baoli ===
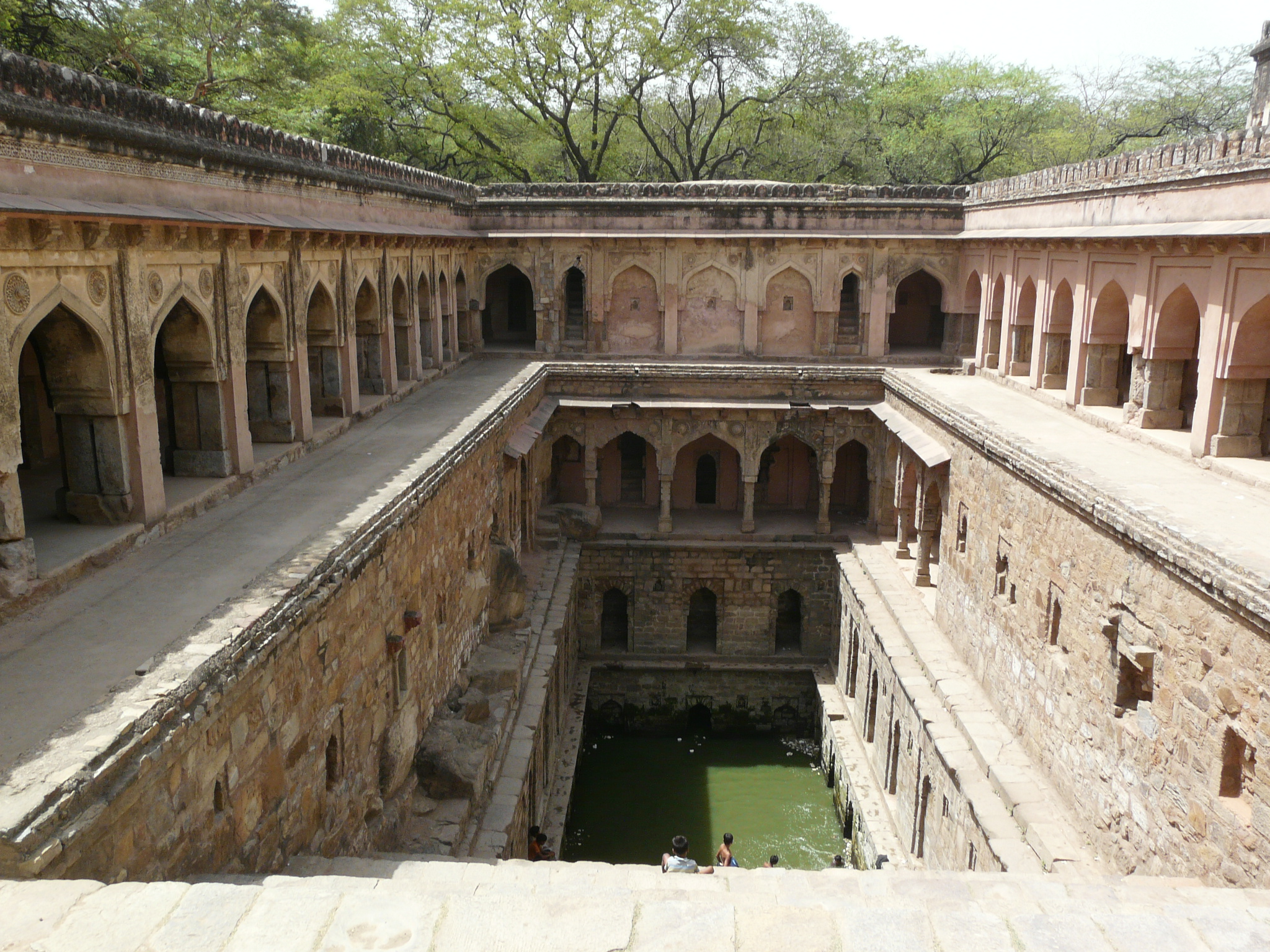
Rajon ki Baoli

The Rajon ki Baoli (28°31′13″N 77°11′00″E), rectangular in plan, is the largest and most ornamented of all the three baolis in Mehrauli. It was built by Sikandar Lodi in 1516. It has a series of steps forming four stages, each in descending size, with floors at each stage, leading to the water level from the surrounding ground level. Its appearance is like a courtyard of the medieval period with passages marked by stylized carved symmetrical arches spanning the columns in North Indian architectural style, which form the three sides of the baoli. There are rooms at each floor which once provided a cool resting place for people. With its incised plaster work, the baoli is an elegant architectural edifice. When built the water used to reach up to the third stage. Over the centuries the well got silted up. It has since been desilted. The Archaeological Survey of India has carried out desilting operations of the well which was silted to a depth of 20 feet (6.1 m), during 2004–05. As a result, the water level has risen by 20 ft and 60 steps in the well lead to the surface of water.

=== Baoli of Emperor Aurangzeb ===
Situated to the west of Zafar Mahal, near the Dargah of Khwaja Qutub-uddin Bakhtiyar Kaki in Mehrauli it was built by Emperor Aurangzeb in imitation of Gandhak ki Baoli and Rajon Ki Baoli. It measured 130 feet by 36 feet while the well was 30 feet in diameter, it contained 74 steps and was built in three stage. The Baoli was destroyed to make residential houses. The area of the Baoli is now an uphill road with rows of homes, shops and warehouses on each side.

== Stepwells in and around Delhi ==
- Delhi
  - Baolis of Mehrauli, group of 4 stepwells
    - Anangtal ki Baoli, built in 11th century by the Tomara dynasty ruler Anangpal II (r.c.1051 – c.1081), is the oldest stepwell in Delhi area and it is a single stage stepwell.
    - Gandhak ki Baoli near Qutub Minar and south of Tomb of Adham Khan, early 13th century: built by Sultan Iltutmish (r. 1211–1236), with 40 metres (130 ft) long and 12 metres (39 ft) wide stairway.
    - Rajon Ki Baoli near Qutub Minar and 200 m from Gandhak ki Baoli, built in 1516 CE by Sikandar Lodi.
    - Aurangzeb ki Baoli in Mehrauli west of Zafar Mahal, near the Dargah of Khwaja Qutub-uddin Bakhtiyar Kaki, built in a late 17th or early 18th century by Emperor Aurangzeb (r. 1658-1707 CE), it is 130 feet by 36 feet with 30 feet diameter well and 74 steps in three stage.
  - Agrasen Ki Baolivnear Connaught Place and Jantar Mantar, 14th century or earlier: literally Stepwell of Agrasen, though some of the architectural features are from the 14th century Tughlaq or Lodi period of Delhi Sultanate. This 60-meter long and 15-meter wide stepwell is located on Hailey Road which connects Kasturba Gandhi Road and Barakhamba Road. It opens from 9:00 a.m. to 5:30 p.m.
  - Hazrat Nizamuddin Ki Baoli near Hazrat Nizamuddin Dargah, 14th century: built by Hazrat Nizamuddin Aulia during Gyasuddin Tughlaq's reign.
  - Dwarka Baoli in Dwarka, 16th century: built in 16th century by the sultans of Lodi Dynasty.
- Haryana
  - Faridabad: Surajkund built in 10th century located on Southern Delhi Ridge of Aravalli Range in Faridabad 8 km (5 mi) from South Delhi.
  - Gurugram: Badshahpur group of stepwells has 3 stepwells,
    - Badshahpur Mohanlal Stepwell built in 1905 by Mohan Lal and currently owned by his grandson Ved Prakash Mangla (c. 2018), is a stepwell on sector road near Sohna Road in Badshahpur in Gurugram.
    - Akhara Stepwell on the same road as Mohanlal Stepwell in Badshahpur, built in 18th-20th centuries in mixed Ahir-Rajput-Jat-Mughal architectural style of 18th-20th centuries.
    - Dhumaspur Stepwell in Djumaspur village near Badshahpur, built in early 19th century.
    - Baoli Ghaus Ali Shah in Farrukhnagar on Farrukhnagar-Jhajjar road near old gate of Farrukhnagar city, 16th century: built by Ghaus Ali Shah, a local chief during the reign of Mughal emperor Farrukh Siyar.
  - Rohtak: Choron ki baoli or Shahjahan ki baoli in Maham, built in 1658-59 CE by Saidu Kala, a local vassal of Emperor Shah Jahan (r. 1628-58 CE) on NH-9 Delhi-Rohtak-Meham-Hisar Road.

== See also ==
- History of Delhi
  - Paleolithic sites in & around Delhi
  - Forts and palaces of Delhi used as the capital
  - Stepwells of Delhi
- Stepwell, the following are UNESCO heritage listed
  - Chand Baori
  - Rani ki vav
- History of water supply and sanitation
  - Water supply and sanitation in the Indus-Saraswati Valley Civilisation
  - Ancient water conservation techniques
    - Ghats
    - Johad
    - Taanka
