= Sanjay Van =

- Forest
- Location in Delhi, India
- Coordinates: 28°32′00″N 77°10′40″E
- Country: India
- State: Delhi

Area
  - Total: 317 ha (783 acres)
- Time zone: UTC+5:30 (IST)
- Lok Sabha constituency: South West Delhi

Sanjay Van is a sprawling city forest area near Vasant Kunj and Mehrauli in Delhi, India. It is spread over an area of 443 acres. It is one of the most thickly wooded areas of the city’s green lungs.

== Concerns ==
The forest, which is part of the Mehrauli South Central Ridge, has undergone severe degradation in recent times with the proliferation of the Prosopis juliflora tree which is non-endemic to the Aravalli Ranges and has caused depletion of the ground water level, killing native flora and changing the natural soil characteristics of the Aravallis. Sewage water and effluent which is discharged into Sanjay Van has also affected this green belt in the Capital.

== Restoration Work ==
Amid a growing demand from nature lovers, the forest is going to be made a bird sanctuary. The Sanjay Van, which is presently undergoing restoration through a unique collaborative effort between the Delhi Development Authority and a citizen's group, may well serve as a model that will be replicated to restore other ridges in the capital.

== Attractions ==
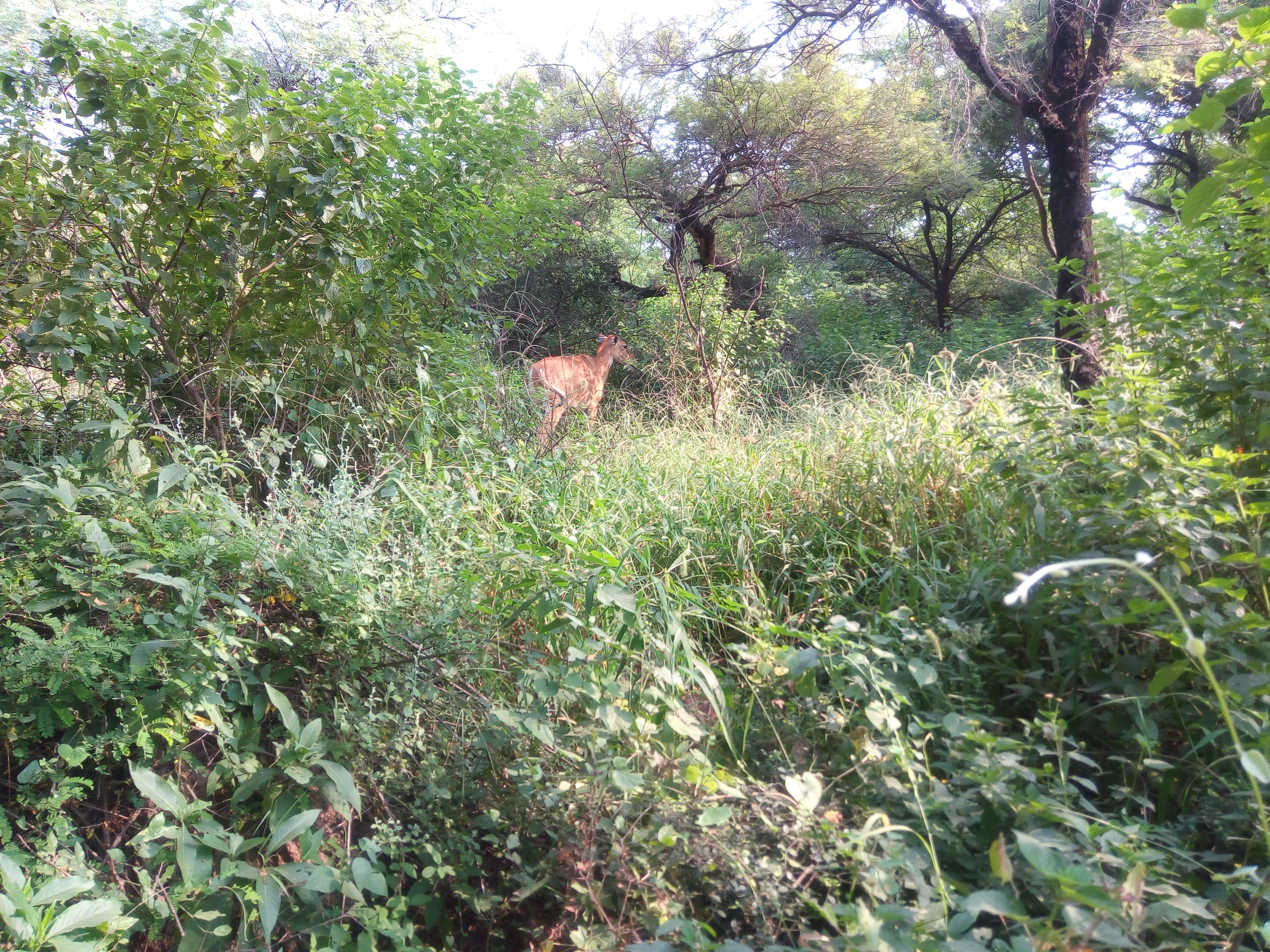
A deer in Sanjay Van

Apart from heritage, the area is one of the few recluses for bird watchers and nature enthusiasts. Resident or visiting birds include the Indian peafowl, grey heron, Eurasian golden oriole, purple sunbird, Asian koel, Brahminy starling, Indian silverbill, grey-breasted prinia, crested honey buzzard, white-throated kingfisher, rufous treepie, Indian paradise flycatcher, Eurasian sparrowhawk, red-wattled lapwing, cattle egret, common moorhen, white-breasted waterhen, grey francolin and the Jacobin cuckoo, a migrant from Africa that breeds in this forest.

The forest also conserves natural habitat for the nilgai, golden jackal, snakes and a large variety of butterflies.

== Terrain ==
The area is part of the Aravalli Range and includes flat and hilly terrain with large rock formations. Small drainage channels occur throughout the area at intervals of about 300–400 metres.

== Visit ==
There are multiple entry and exit points, but the ones at the Qutub Institutional Area and Neela Hauz Bridge near Vasant Kunj provide the easiest access and least confusion. Visitors are advised to wear shoes and full-length trousers as protection against the thorny shrubbery, and to take sufficient fluids and snacks, as there is no kiosk or shop in the quiet of the woods.

== See also ==
- Najafgarh drain bird sanctuary
- Okhla Sanctuary
- Asola Bhatti Wildlife Sanctuary
- Sultanpur National Park
- Neela Hauz biodiversity park
- Qila Rai Pithora
