= India International Institute of Democracy and Election Management =

Indian government agency

India International Institute of Democracy and Election Management (IIIDEM) is an election committee and institute in India founded by Election Commission of India (ECI).

== Background ==
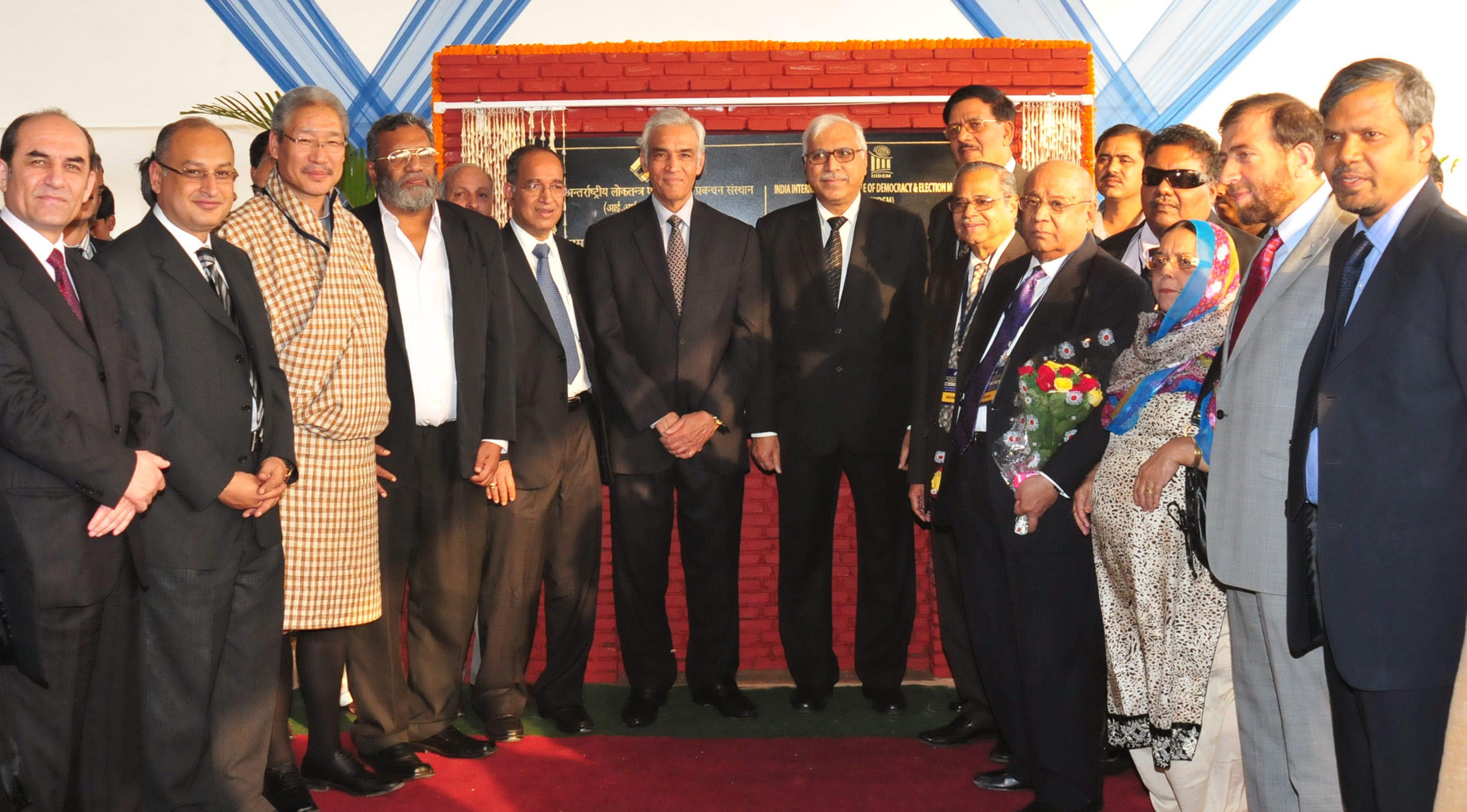
S.Y Quraishi laid the foundation stone of the India International Institute of Democracy and Election Management (IIIDEM), in New Delhi. The Lt. Governor of Delhi, Shri Tejinder Khanna, the Election Commissioner

In June 2011, the Election Commission of India (ECI), established the India International Institute of Democracy and Election Management (IIIDEM) to advance its professional competence in election management, promote peoples participation, contribute to developing stronger democratic institutions and support the efforts of ECI in carrying out its mandate and functions.

The IIIDEM shifted to its independent complex at Dwarka, New Delhi in April, 2019. Its primary responsibility being to continuously train and upgrade capacities of personnel who are deployed under the supervision and control of Election Commission of India to fulfil the Commission’s Constitutional mandate. The Constitution of India mandates ECI to conduct elections to the high offices of President and Vice-President of India; elections to the Rajya Sabha (House of State); the General Election to the House of the People; the General Election to the State Legislative Assemblies and election to the State Legislative Councils. Thus, cumulatively, IIIDEM is tasked to cover almost 11 million personnel to professionally conduct the said elections in a cascading training model developed and customized by the IIIDEM under the supervision of the Election Commission of India.

The Indian elections generate a lot of interest worldwide and, the ECI regularly receives requests from fellow Election Management Bodies (EMBs) for training & capacity building, so that their election officials are continuously equipped with upgraded competency and skills. In response to this growing demand of international “training needs”, the Commission has signed Memorandums of Understanding with a number of countries and inter-government agencies for sharing best practices and providing technical assistance.

To operationalize these MoUs and, to institutionalize the above explained national and so also the International trainings demand from EMBs, the Election Commission, in order to provide undivided attention to the changing needs of training, capacity development, research and documentation, to provide coordination for all training activities across the country and, to assist the young and emerging democracies established, IIIDEM in 2011. The IIIDEM, since April, 2019 has been located at its own campus at Plot No. Sector 13 Dwarka, New Delhi-110078.

From 2011 & upto June 2024, 2819 international trainees from 141 countries have been imparted election management training at IIIDEM.

== Academics & Curriculum ==
For international trainees, a special international curriculum covering to themes has been developed by IIIDEM in coordination with IFES, Washington & launched in 2022. The thematics are; Planning of Election; Political Finance; Voter Registration: Election Technology; Inclusive Elections; Voter Education; Gender and Elections: Introduction to Election Administration, Social Media and Elections; Political Parties and EMB's.

A specialized Master's Program in International Electoral Management and Practices (MIEMP) has been developed by IIIDEM in collaboration with Tata Institute of Social Sciences (TISS), Mumbai. The program aims to enhance the capacity of election officials currently engaged in the organization and management of elections in various parts of the globe in various countries, and to raise the professional standards of Election Management Bodies (EMBs). The first batch of the Master’s Program (Academic Year 2022-24) had a total of 33 participants, with 20 participants from ECI, (including from establishment of Chief Electoral Officer (CEO) in States & UTs), five international participants and, eight from open category. The five international participants are from the EMBs of Bangladesh, Bhutan, Maldives and Philippines. The second batch of the Master’s Program (Academic Year 2023-25) has 42 participants with 18 participants from ECI (including from establishment of CEO's in States & UTs), 4 international participants and, 20 candidates from open category. The 4 international participants are from Kenya, Moldova, Myanmar and Suriname

To prepare for General Election 2024 to the House of the People (Lok Sabha) in India IIIDEM developed 20 training interventions covering all vital statutory & non statutory tasks required to deliver a free, fair & participative election. These thematics were cross referenced to the various statutory positions in operation to conduct General Election i.e. RO, ARO, DEOS Dy. DEOs etc. In all, 23028 domestic election officials were directly trained by IIIDEM in 2023-24 to conduct the general election 2024 & 10 elections of State Legislative Assemblies. The said training & testing was done both on VC & physical mode 237 National Level Master Trainers (NLMTS) & 1804 State Level Master Trainers (SLMTs) were trained & certified to roll out the "cascading training" model of IIIDEM which is structured with a "direct training” component by IIIDEM & thereafter, for state election officers below the ARO through state resources by training & certifying NLMTs & SLMTs.

== Structure ==
IIIDEM functions under the direct supervision of the Election Commission of India with Chief Election Commissioner and two Election Commissioners heading its apex. In operational terms IIIDEM is headed by a Director General and is poised to have the following centres of excellence:

i. Centre for Training and Capacity Development - This Centre is visualized to provide comprehensive training programmes along with refresher courses and theme based programmes in election management. A team of National Level Master Trainers (NLMTs) is developed to deliver a cascaded training approach targeted at District Election Officers, Returning Officers and Electoral Officers.

ii. Centre for International Cooperation and Capacity Building - This Centre deals with international collaboration with focus on overseas training development, tie-ups with international electoral organizations and other international workshops in collaboration with international organizations.

iii. Centre for IT and E- Learning - The centre is tasked with development of E-Learning LMS and improvement of available modules to achieve professional quality. The centre also forms partnerships with E-Learning Organizations/ Institutions in India and across the globe.

iv. Centre for Voter Education - This centre (not yet operationalized) is visualized to work on capacity development for voter education, documentation for international best practices in voter education and also formalizes international collaboration in this field.

v. Centre for Innovation, Research and Documentation - This Centre (not yet operationalized) will undertake research on electoral data, to promote innovation and to prepare documents on various electoral subjects. The centre will also interact with academic institutions for development of collaborative projects and literature on elections.

vi Centre for Electoral Laws - This centre (not yet operationalized) is visualized to engage in the study of Indian and international electoral laws. Additionally, the centre also will provide necessary support to other wings in developing modules for training. The centre will also be involved in developing international standards and practices for improving electoral laws and election management processes.

== Publications ==
IIIDEM brings out several handbooks/ guidebooks for different types of election functionaries. Along with this, IIIDEM also develops materials like case studies, films, mock polling materials. The institute also undertakes applied research to connect the world of theory on democracy and election management to actual practice and hands on experience.

== Alumni ==
=== International Alumni ===
International alumni includes senior functionaries such as chairpersons, Director of Elections, Deputy Director General, Election Officers from Afghanistan, Australia, Azerbaijan, Bangladesh, Belarus, Belize, Bhutan, Botswana, Cambodia, Cameroon, Costa Rica, Cote d’Ivore, Democratic Republic of Congo, East Timor, Egypt, el Salvador, Ethiopia, Fiji, Gambia, Georgia, Ghana, Grenada, Guyana, Jamaica, Jordan, Kenya, Kyrgyzstan, Lebanon, Lesotho, Lithuania, Malawi, Malaysia, Maldives, Mauritius, Mongolia, Mozambique, Myanmar, Namibia, Nauru, Nepal, Niger, Nigeria, Pakistan, Palestine, Panama, Papua New Guinea, Peru, Samoa, Senegal, Sierra Leone, South Africa, South Sudan, Sri Lanka, St. Lucia, Sudan, Tajikistan, Tanzania, Thailand, Tonga, Trinidad and Tobago, Turkmenistan, Tuvalu, Uzbekistan, Vanuatu, Yemen and Zambia.

=== Domestic Alumni ===
Domestic alumni include Chief Electoral Officers of Indian states, additional Chief Electoral Officers, Returning Officers and other Election Functionaries
