= Qila Rai Pithora =

- Lal Kot
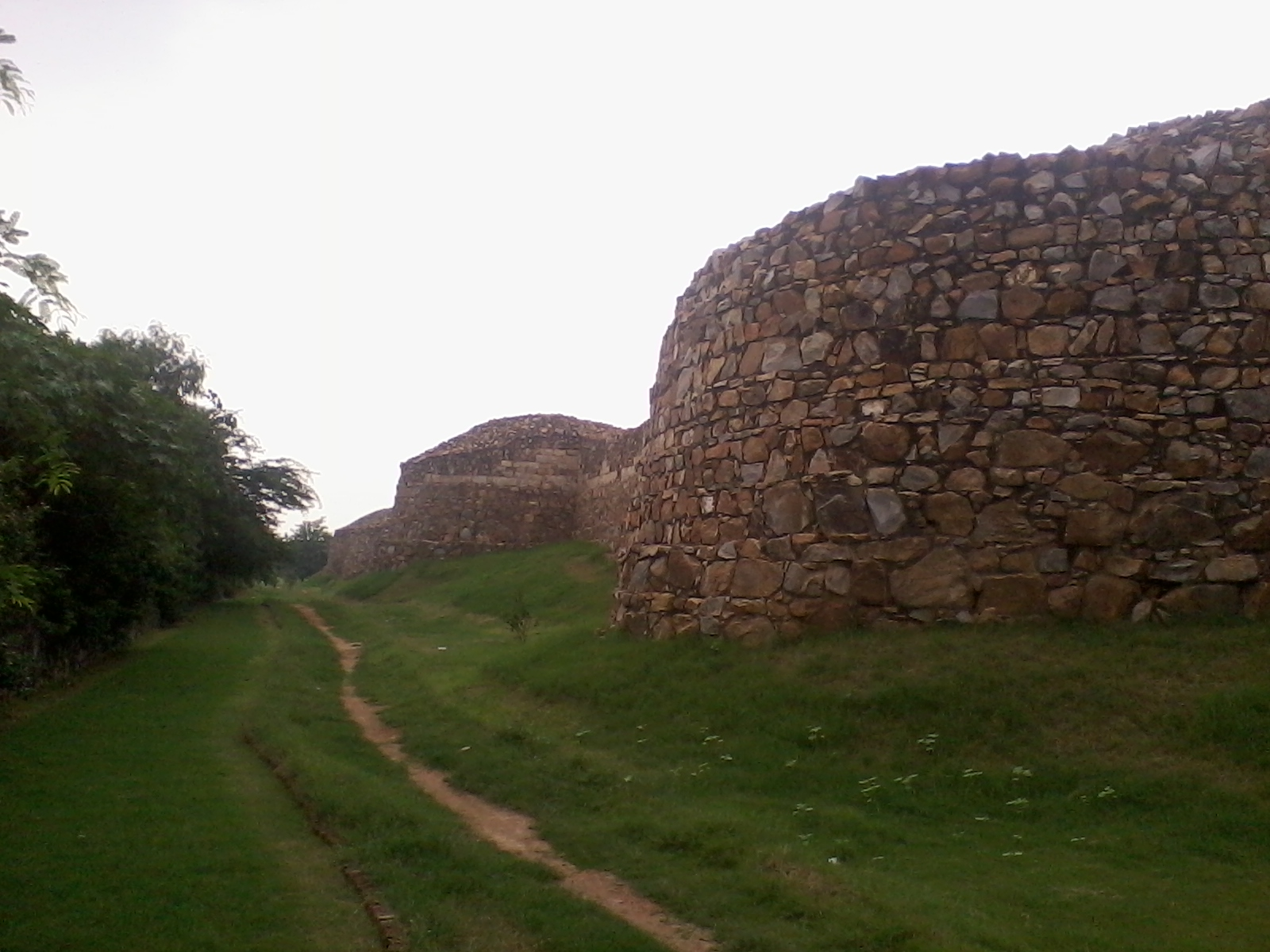
- Lal Kot — The fort built by Anangpal Tomar

- Location in Delhi, India, Asia Qila Rai Pithora (India)
- 28.52°N 77.18°E
- Location: Mehrauli, Delhi, India

History
- Built: c. 1052 – c.1060 CE
- Original use: Fortress of Tomars

Site notes
- Architect: Anangpal Tomar

Qila Rai Pithora or Lal Kot (lit. "Rai Pithora's Fort") is a fortified complex in present-day Delhi, which includes the Qutb Minar complex. It was constructed in the reign of Tomar Rajput ruler Anangpal Tomar between c. 1052 - c.1060 CE. It is termed as the "First city of Delhi". Remains of the fort walls are scattered across South Delhi, visible in present Saket, Mehrauli around Qutb complex, Sanjay Van, Kishangarh and Vasant Kunj areas.

== Association with Anangpal Tomar II – Lal Kot ==
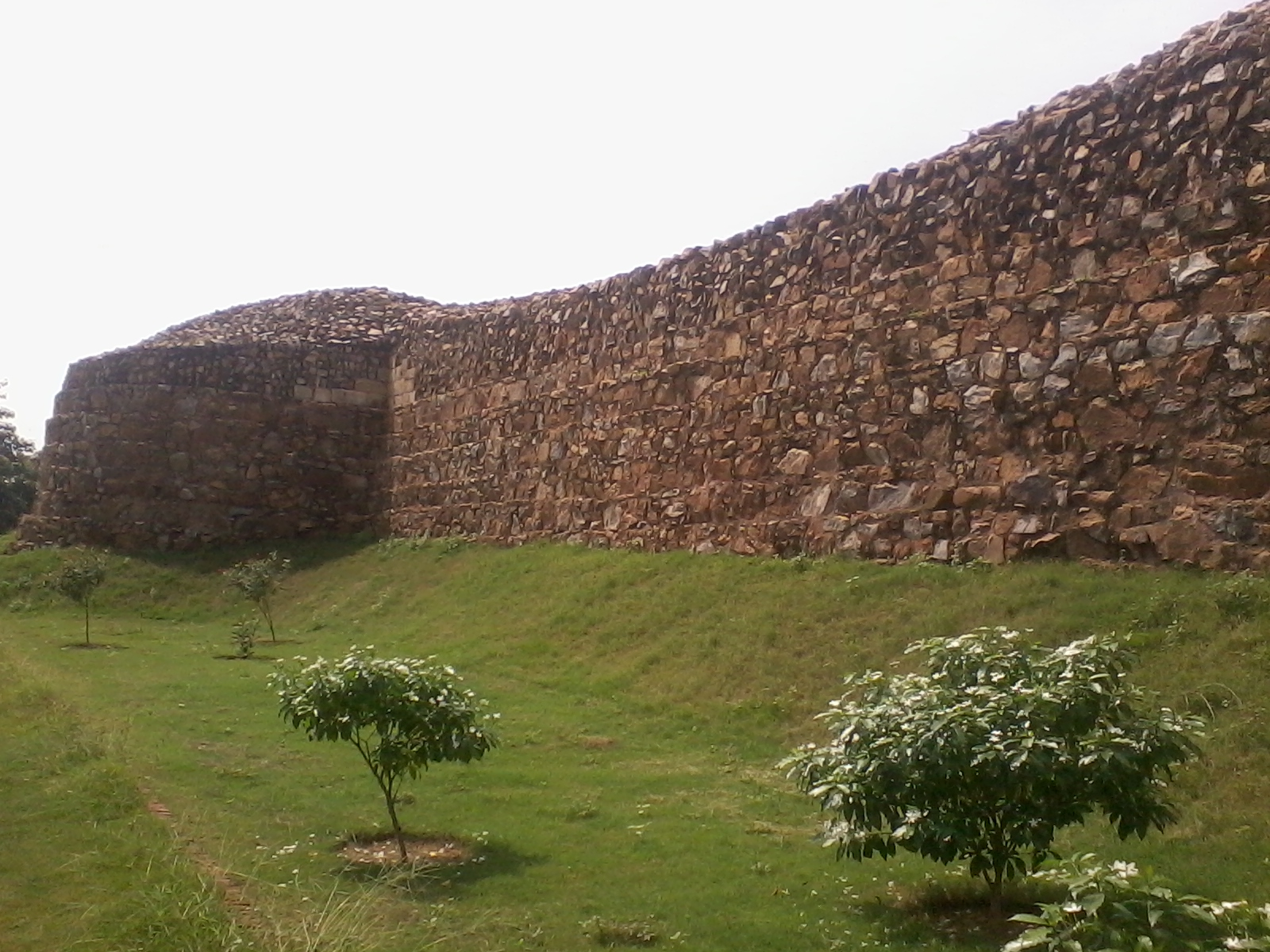
Round bastions of Lal Kot

The Lal Kot (as the Qila Rai Pithora was originally called) is believed to be constructed in the reign of the Tomar king Anangpal II. He brought the iron pillar from the Saunkh location (Mathura) and got it fixed in Delhi in the year 1052, as evident from the inscriptions on it. By assuming the iron pillar as the center, numerous palaces and temples were built, and finally the fort Lal Kot was built around them. The construction of the Lal Kot finished in the year 1060. The circumference of the fort was more than 2 miles, and the walls of the fort were 60 feet high and 30 feet thick.

“Anangpal II was instrumental in populating Indraprastha and giving it its present name, Delhi. The region was in ruins when he ascended the throne in the 11th century, it was he who built the Lal Kot fort (Qila Rai Pithora) and Anangtal Baoli. The Tomar rule over the region is attested by multiple inscriptions and coins, and their ancestry can be traced to the Pandavas (of the Mahabharata)" said BR Mani, former joint director-general of the Archaeological Survey of India (ASI).

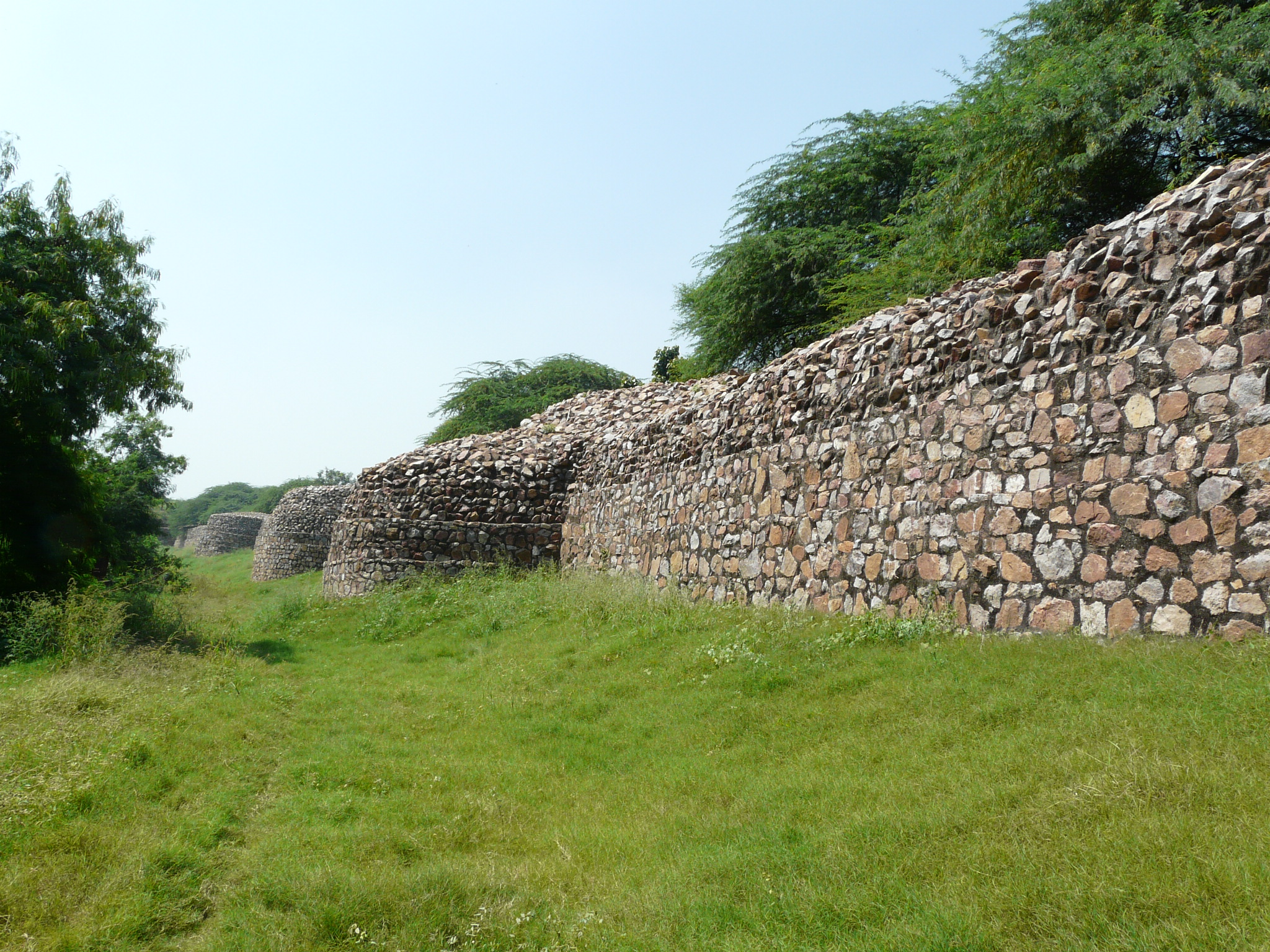
Wall of Lal Kot

Lal Kot was Delhi’s original ‘red fort’. What we call Red Fort or Lal Qila today was originally called Qila-e-Mubarak built by Mughal Emperor Shah Jahan.

A short inscription on the Qutb Minar reads "Pirathi Nirapa", which some writers read as vernacular for "King Prithvi". Some coins, called "Dehliwalas" in the early sources of the Delhi Sultanate, were issued by a series of kings which include the Tomara rulers and a king called "Prithipala". This King Prithvi or Prithipala is believed to be the 3rd last Tomar king of Delhi - Prithvipal Tomar. Due to his name being similar to the famous King Prithviraj Chauhan of that time, he has been completely overlapped in the history.

Hasan Nizami, a Persian author who wrote Tajul-Ma'asir, the first official history of the Delhi Sultanate praised the Lal Kot as follows - "After settling the case of Ajmer, the conqueror (Shahabuddin Ghori) came to Delhi, which was among the major cities of Hindus. When he came to Delhi, he saw a fortress (Lal Kot) which was so marvellous that there was no other fort of height and firmness equal to it in the whole world.

== Association ==
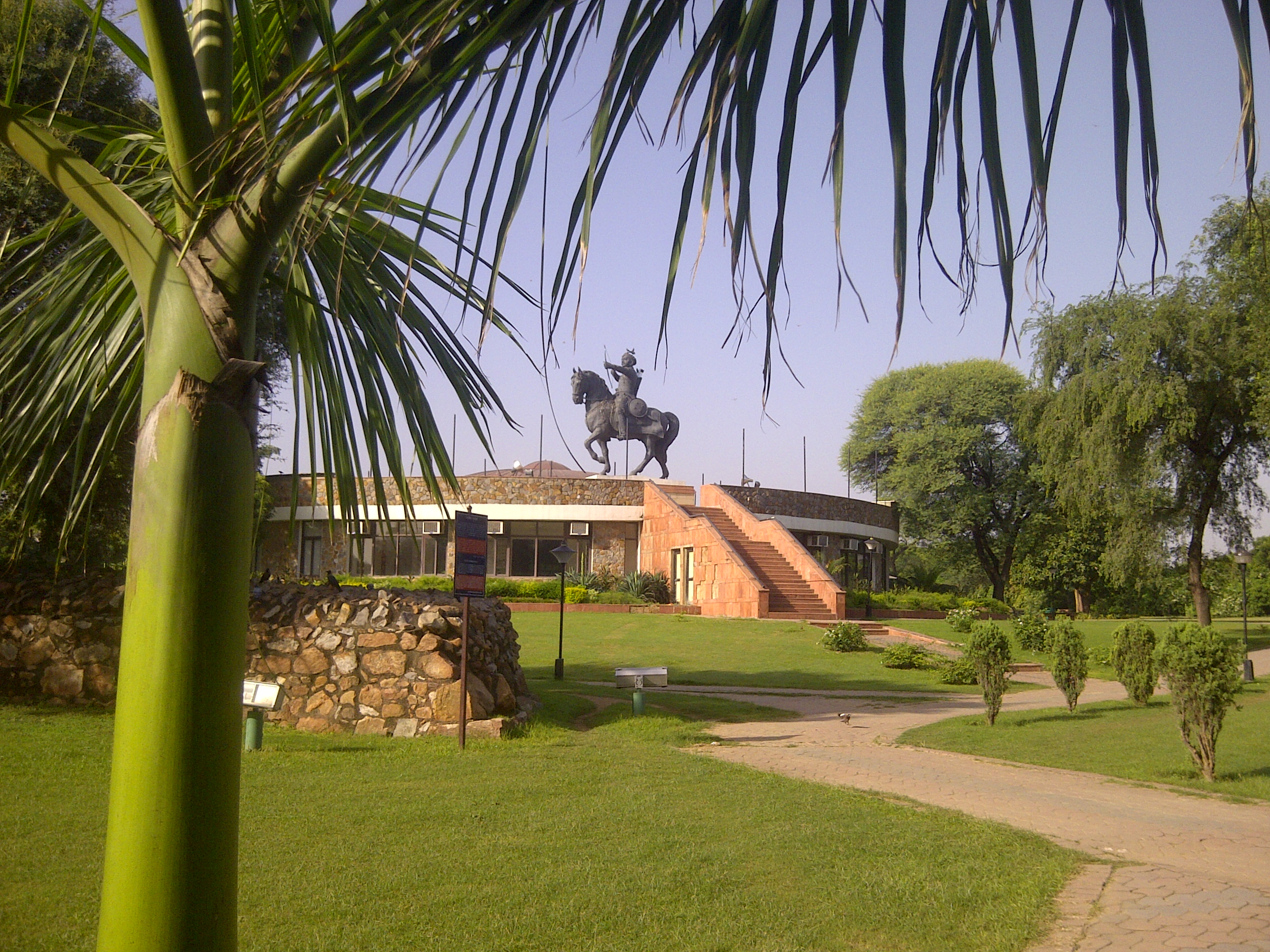

== Other theories ==
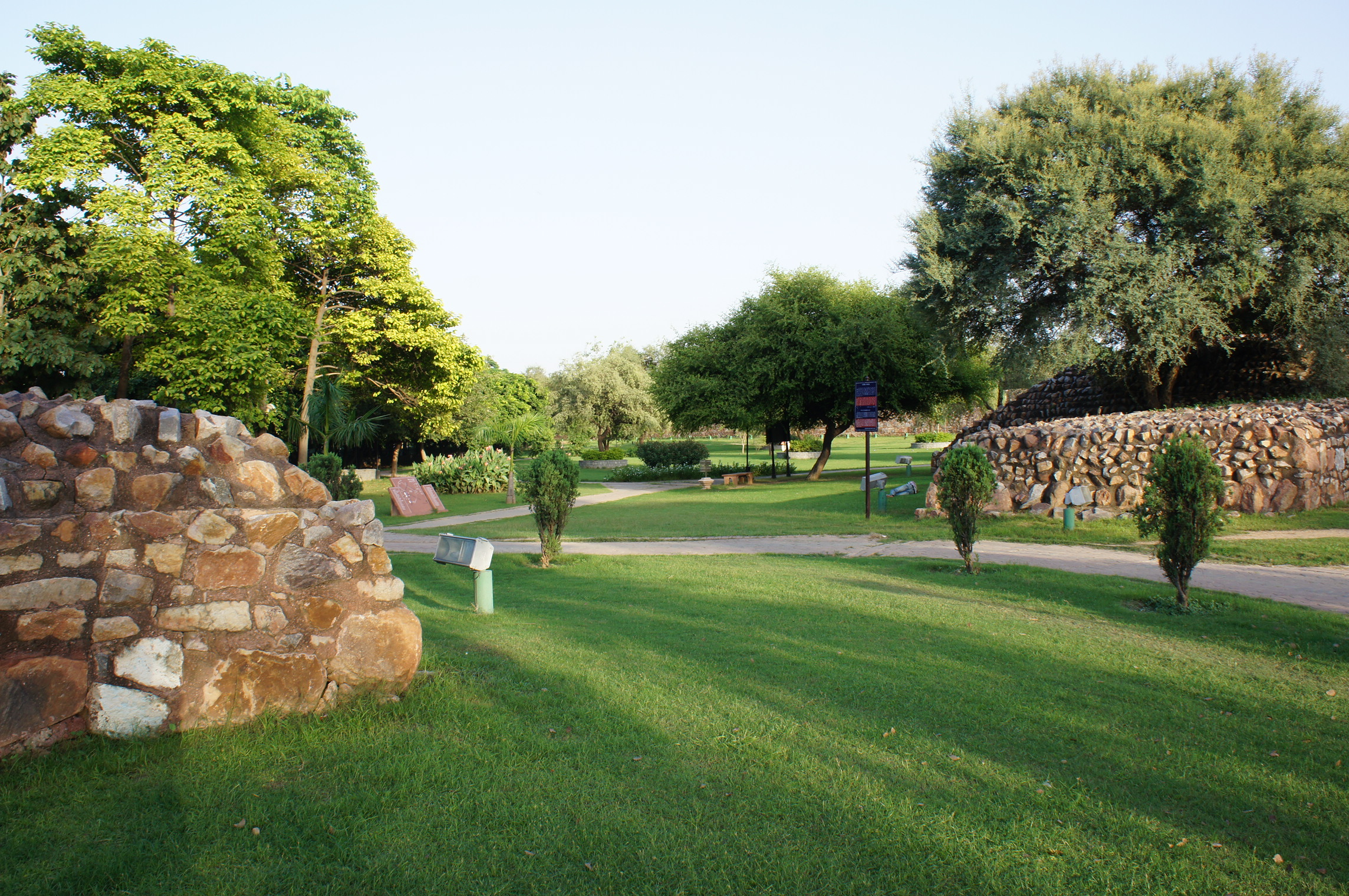
Gateway

Alexander Cunningham classified the site into older ("Lal Kot") and newer ("Qila Rai Pithora") parts attributed to the Tomaras and the Chahamanas respectively, but later archaeological excavations have cast doubt on this classification.

Carr Stephen (1876) considered "Lal Kot" only a palace, and used the name "Qila Rai Pithora" to describe the pre-Sultanate fortification at the site. B. R. Mani (1997) referred to the site as "Lal Kot", using the term "Qila Rai Pithora" to describe a fortification wall possibly built by the Chahamanas.

Catherine B. Asher (2000) describes Qila Rai Pithora as Lal Kot enlarged with rubble walls and ramparts. She theorizes that Qila Rai Pithora served as a city, while Lal Kot remained the citadel. Qila Rai Pithora, which was twice as large as the older citadel, had more massive and higher walls, and the combined fort extended to six and a half km.

Asher states that after the Ghurid conquest of the Chahamana kingdom in 1192 CE, the Ghurid governor Qutb al-Din Aibak occupied Qila Rai Pithora, and renamed it to "Dilhi" (modern Delhi), reviving the site's older name. However, Cynthia Talbot (2015) notes that the term "Qila Rai Pithora" first appears in the 16th-century text Ain-i-Akbari, and the older texts use the term "Dehli" to describe the site. Aibak and his successors did not extend or change the fort structure.

== See also ==
- Capital forts/palaces in Delhi, oldest first
  - Purana Qila, earliest Hindu rulers
    - Indraprastha, earlier than 1000 BCE
    - Edicts & additions by Ashoka the Great (r. 268 to 232 BCE) of Maurya Empire
  - Anangpur, by Anangpal I of Tomara dynasty (r. 736-1152 CE)
  - Qila Rai Pithora
    - Lal Kot, by Tomara dynasty (1152-1177 CE) as capital
    - Qila Rai Pithora, the Lal Kot expended by Chahamanas (also called Rai Pithora, r. 1177–92 CE) of Chauhan dynasty
  - Siri Fort, by Alauddin Khalji (r. 1296–1316), second ruler of Khalji Dynasty
  - Tughlaqabad Fort, by Ghiyassudin Tughluq (r. 1320-25 CE) of Tughluq dynasty
  - Feroz Shah Kotla, by Feroz Shah Tughluq (r. 1351-88 CE) of Tughluq dynasty
  - Salimgarh Fort, in 1546 CE by Salim Shah Suri (r. 1545-54 CE), son of Sher Shah Suri
  - Red fort, built in 1639-48 CE by Mughal emperor Shah Jahan when he moved his capital from Agra to Delhi
  - Rashtrapati Bhavan, built in 1912-29 by colonial British raj
- History of Delhi
  - Paleolithic sites in & around Tughlaqabad Fort
  - Stepwells of Delhi
- Kings who had this fort as their capital
  - Anangpal Tomar II
- Nearby
  - Sanjay Van
