= Dwarka, Delhi =

Neighbourhood of Delhi, India

- Neighborhood of Delhi
- Location in India
- Coordinates: 28°35′4.278″N 77°02′57.044″E
- Country: India
- State: Delhi
- District: South West Delhi
- Named for: Dwarka

Government
  - Type: Municipal Corporation
  - Members of the Legislative Assembly: Parduymn Rajput, MLA-Dwarka; Sandeep Sehrawat, MLA-Matiala
  - District Magistrate and Deputy Commissioner: Rahul Singh, IAS

Area
  - Total: 56.48 km^{2} (21.81 sq mi)

Population
  - Total: 1,200,000
  - Density: 21,000/km^{2} (55,000/sq mi)

Languages
  - Official: Hindi, English
- Time zone: UTC+5:30 (IST)
- PIN: 110075, 110077, 110078
- Nearest city: Gurugram
- Lok Sabha constituency: West Delhi
- Vidhan Sabha constituency: Dwarka/Matiyala (Different sectors fall in different constituencies)
- Civic agency: DDA

Dwarka is a neighbourhood located in Southwestern edge of Indian Capital New Delhi in South West Delhi district of the NCT of Delhi. The district court that functions under the Delhi High Court for South West Delhi is located in Dwarka.

The sub-city is close to Indira Gandhi International Airport and the Millennium City of Gurugram in Haryana in the NCR region. It is among the largest sub-cities in Asia. Dwarka is organised into sectors and mainly has Cooperative Group Housing Societies as residential options. It is one of the most sought-after residential areas in Delhi. The sub-city also has the largest rooftop solar plant in the Union territory of Delhi.

In January 2017, the Cabinet of India approved Dwarka to be the second Diplomatic Enclave for 39 countries on 34 hectares, after Chanakyapuri. In 2016, the Cabinet of India, chaired by PM Narendra Modi, approved 89.72 hectares of land for an Exhibition-cum Convention centre, estimated to cost ₹260 billion (US$2.7 billion).

Dwarka is being developed as a smart city under Delhi Development Authority's ‘smart sub-city’ project. Dwarka (Delhi Assembly constituency) and Matiala (Delhi Assembly constituency) both represent Dwarka sub-city and are one of the 70 Vidhan Sabha constituencies of Delhi.

== History ==
=== Origins ===
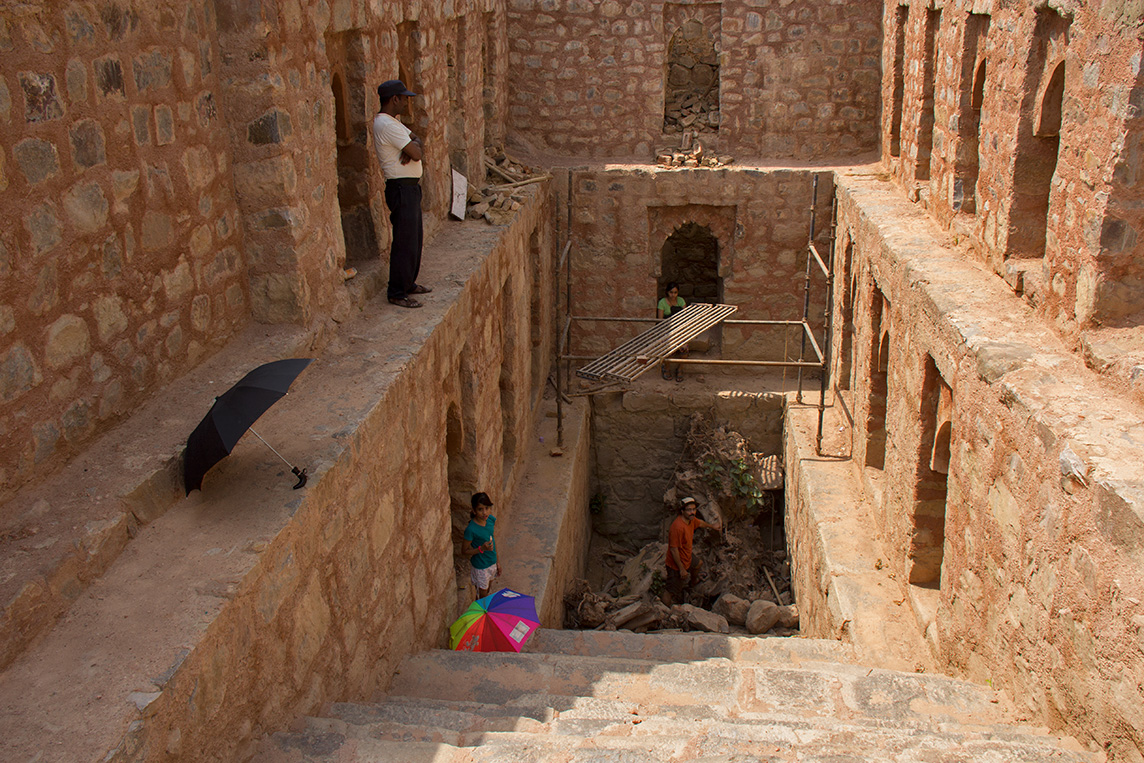
Dwarka Baoli is a stepwell constructed for the residents of Loharehri village by the Sultans of the Lodi Dynasty in the early 16th century.

Dwarka is named after the legendary Dwaraka kingdom. It is a short distance away from Gurgaon which is a major hub for large national and multinational corporations in the country and about 10 km away from Indira Gandhi International Airport. With the opening up of the Airport Express Line in 2011,

Some parts of modern-day Dwarka historically came under the colony of Pappankalan, which are now being developed under the 'Urban Expansion Projects' of the Delhi Development Authority.

Dwarka Baoli (also known as Loharehri Baoli) is a historical stepwell recently discovered in Dwarka Sub City, in South West Delhi, India. An elaborate conservation project by the India National Trust for Art and Cultural Heritage (Intach) for the Lodi-era baoli was completed recently. It was constructed for the residents of Loharehri village by the Sultans of the Lodi Dynasty in the early 16th century. Dwarka now stands where the Loharehri village once stood.

=== 21st century ===
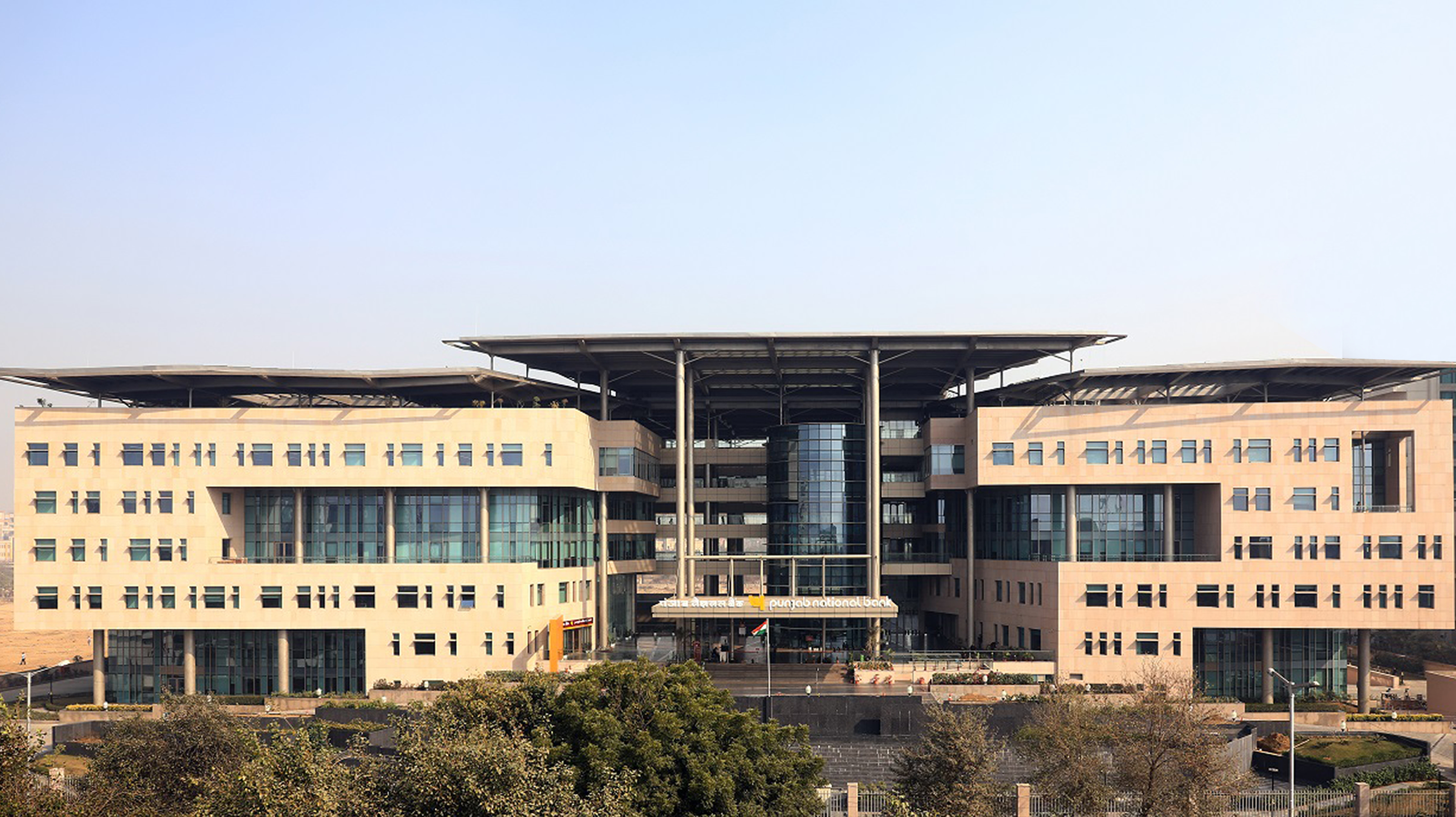
Punjab National Bank corporate head office in Dwarka

In 2019, Minister of Home Affairs Rajnath Singh inaugurated India's first National Cyber Forensic Lab which is part of the National Cyber Coordination Centre and Cyber Protection Awareness and Detection Center (Cypad) of Delhi Police in Dwarka. The Election Commission of India has established India International Institute of Democracy and Election Management campus in Dwarka. The National Highways Authority of India headquarters, an autonomous agency of the Government of India, set up in 1988, is located in Dwarka.

The Ministry of External Affairs owns the MEA Housing Complex in Dwarka, which houses its officials and diplomats. The Government of Delhi has approved the construction of Indira Gandhi Hospital, a super-speciality hospital in Dwarka, which will cost ₹850 crore (US$88 million) and will be spread over 24 acres, to be operational from the year 2020. The Punjab National Bank opened its new corporate head office in Dwarka in 2018.

In 2020, Manipur Bhavan is being built in Dwarka by Government of Manipur. In 2021, as per media reports Government of Bihar built Bihar Sadan in Dwarka.

== Politics ==
It is part of the Dwarka, Delhi Assembly constituency. Parduymn Rajput of Bharatiya Janata Party is the MLA since 2025.

== Groundwater and land subsidence ==
A study published in Nature Scientific Reports reports that land is sinking down in Delhi due to groundwater overpumping.

== Cityscape ==
=== Parks ===
Delhi Development Authority is currently planning to establish Bharat Vandana Park, to be spread over 220 acres in sector 20.

== Culture ==
=== Sports ===
Dwarka is home to a sports complex (DDA Sports Complex) in Sector 11 with facilities such as Tennis (Clay and hard Courts), Badminton (including a covered Badminton Hall), Table Tennis, Billiards / Snooker / Pool, Basket Ball, Volleyball, Jogging Track, Cricket, Cricket Practice Pitches, Multigym, Skating, Snack Bar, pro Shop, Tennis Practice wall, Squash, Children's Park, Yoga, Karate, and Swimming Pool with Toddler Pool. The Delhi Development Authority is planning to create an 18-hole state-of-the-art golf course over an area of 173 acres in Sector 24.

== Location ==
- The sub-city is located in South West Delhi in the vicinity of Gurugram and Delhi's International Airport.
- NH-8, Outer Ring Road, Najafgarh Road, Pankha Road, Near Dabri Mor, and the Rewari railway line bound it.
- West End, Uttam Nagar, Vasant Kunj, Vikas Puri, Najafgarh, Bijwasan, Palam Vihar, Vasant Vihar, Janakpuri residential areas, and Delhi cantonment are the other major surrounding areas in South/West Delhi.
- Dwarka is the largest residential suburb in Asia, with 1718 residential enclaves, and a net population of 1,100,000.

Currently, the Dwarka Sub-City (Sector 1 to 29) is divided into 5 MCD Wards:

135 - Kakraula
136 - Matiala
141 - Bijwasan
145 - Palam
147 - Mahavir Enclave.

Dwarka is divided into three Assembly Constituencies, i.e. AC-34 Matiala, AC-36 Bijwasan, and AC-37 Palam. It is also divided into two parliamentary constituencies, West Delhi and South Delhi. The area of Dwarka Sub-city, as per DDA records, is 5648 hectares.

== Social issues ==
=== Sanitation ===
The irregularity in transportation of garbage and the South Delhi Municipal Corporation failing to clean Dwarka, has recently caused the sub-city to face a severe sanitation crisis. The Delhi High Court has been looking into the issue of lack of sanitation and cleaning in Dwarka since 2014. Civic agencies such as DDA and the municipal corporation have blamed Dwarka filth on ‘lack of civic sense’.

In February 2020, the Delhi High Court directed the South Delhi Municipal Corporation and DDA to provide a healthy and safe environment to residents of the sub-city.

=== Crime ===
Two new police districts were proposed in 2016 to increase security. Dwarka sub-city, which earlier came under one police station, has now been split up between three police stations – Dwarka North, Dwarka South and Dwarka West.

== Transportation ==
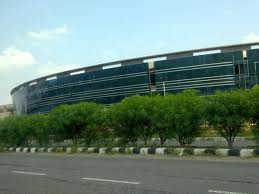
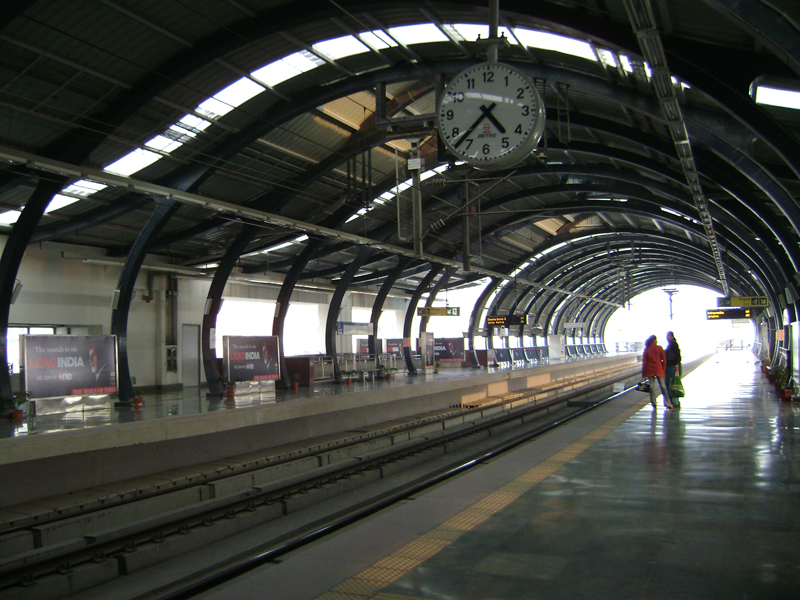
Metro Stations in Dwarka
- Dwarka's robust and well-connected road network is built to modern specifications for each of its sectors and adjoining areas.
- The sub-city is well connected by metro rail with the city centre and other major parts of the city by MRTS. There are a total of 8 metro stations in Dwarka.
- Connected to Indira Gandhi International Airport Terminal 3 via Sector 21 Station interchange with the Airport Express Line.
- The sub-city is now connected via the Delhi Metro to Noida (UP), Anand Vihar and Ghaziabad (Vaishali Station).
- The sub-city will be connected to the mother city by four major roads from all directions.
- If entering from the north, a 45-meter-wide road connecting Pankha Road partly covers the Dabri Palam drain. Work was completed and the road was opened to the public in 2007.
- If entering from the west, a 60-meter-wide road connecting Najafgarh Road is constructed.
- If entering from the east, a 45-meter-wide road through the Cantonment area with a flyover near Palam. The flyover and road were opened to the public in 2006.
- If entering from the southeast, go through a 60-meter-wide road from NH-8 (with a rail underpass). The road was already constructed.
- Airport Express (Orange Line) of Delhi Metro connects Dwarka to the Indira Gandhi International Airport and terminates at New Delhi metro station from where one can go to New Delhi railway station.
- Due to its proximity to the NCR town, Dwarka is expected to be connected to Gurgaon by metro shortly.

== Cultural hub ==
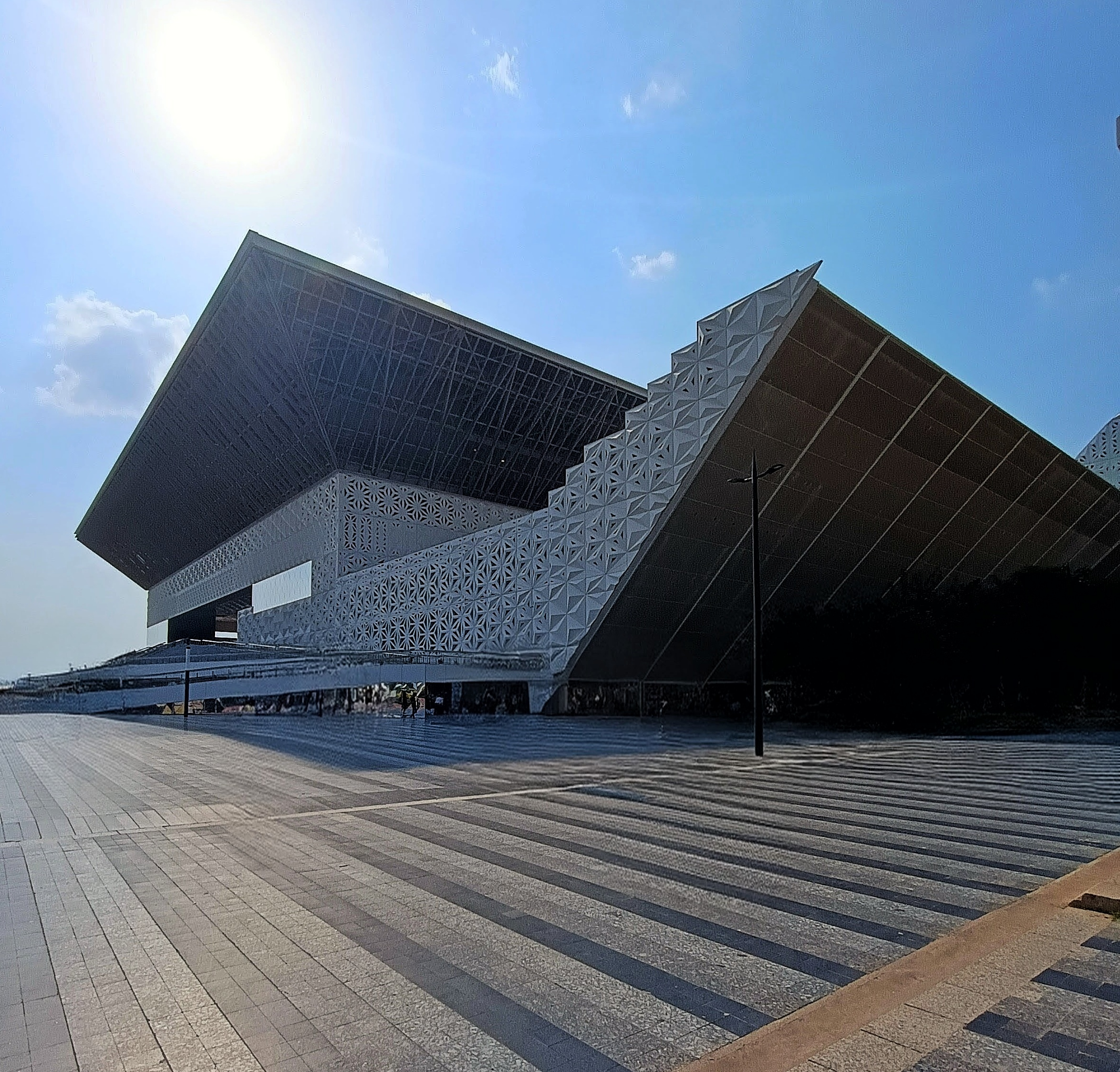
Yashobhoomi Convention and Expo Centre, Sect 25 Dwarka

Dwarka sub-city is emerging as a cultural hub of southwest Delhi. Different music and dance clubs are present. Shopping centres have come up in the five-star hotels and another one next to the Sector 12 metro station, which hosts a few eateries and places to hang out.

In 2019, Vegas Mall, a commercial complex, was inaugurated. It consists of a shopping mall, movie theatre, corporate offices and various restaurants spread over an area of 7 acres. The architecture of Vegas Mall was designed by Bentel Associates International, Johannesburg, SA.

In 2018, Pacific India was selected to develop a ₹1 billion (US$10 million) shopping mall and multi-level car parking at the Dwarka Sector 21 metro station.

== Mixed land use concept ==
DDA has implemented a unique Mixed Land Use (MLU) concept in Dwarka. Most of the DDA housing clusters in Dwarka have commercial buildings nearby. In many sectors, approximately 80% of a plot is used for residential flats and the remaining 20% for commercial use. This unique MLU concept is convenient for the occupants of Dwarka DDA flats, as they get shopping, dining, and grocery shopping facilities nearby.

== Social infrastructure ==
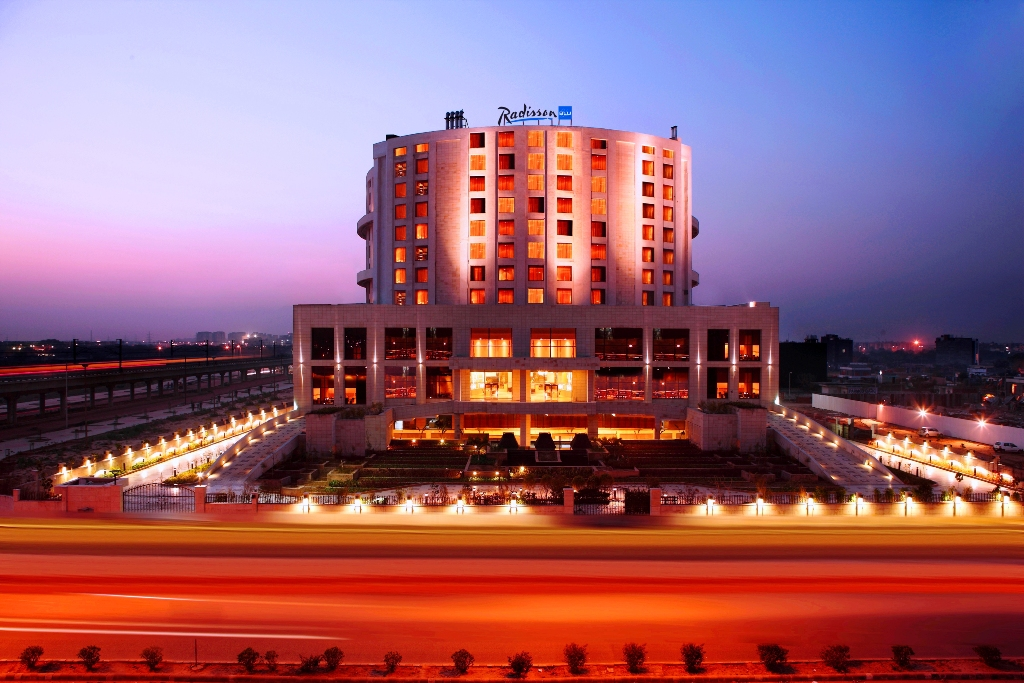
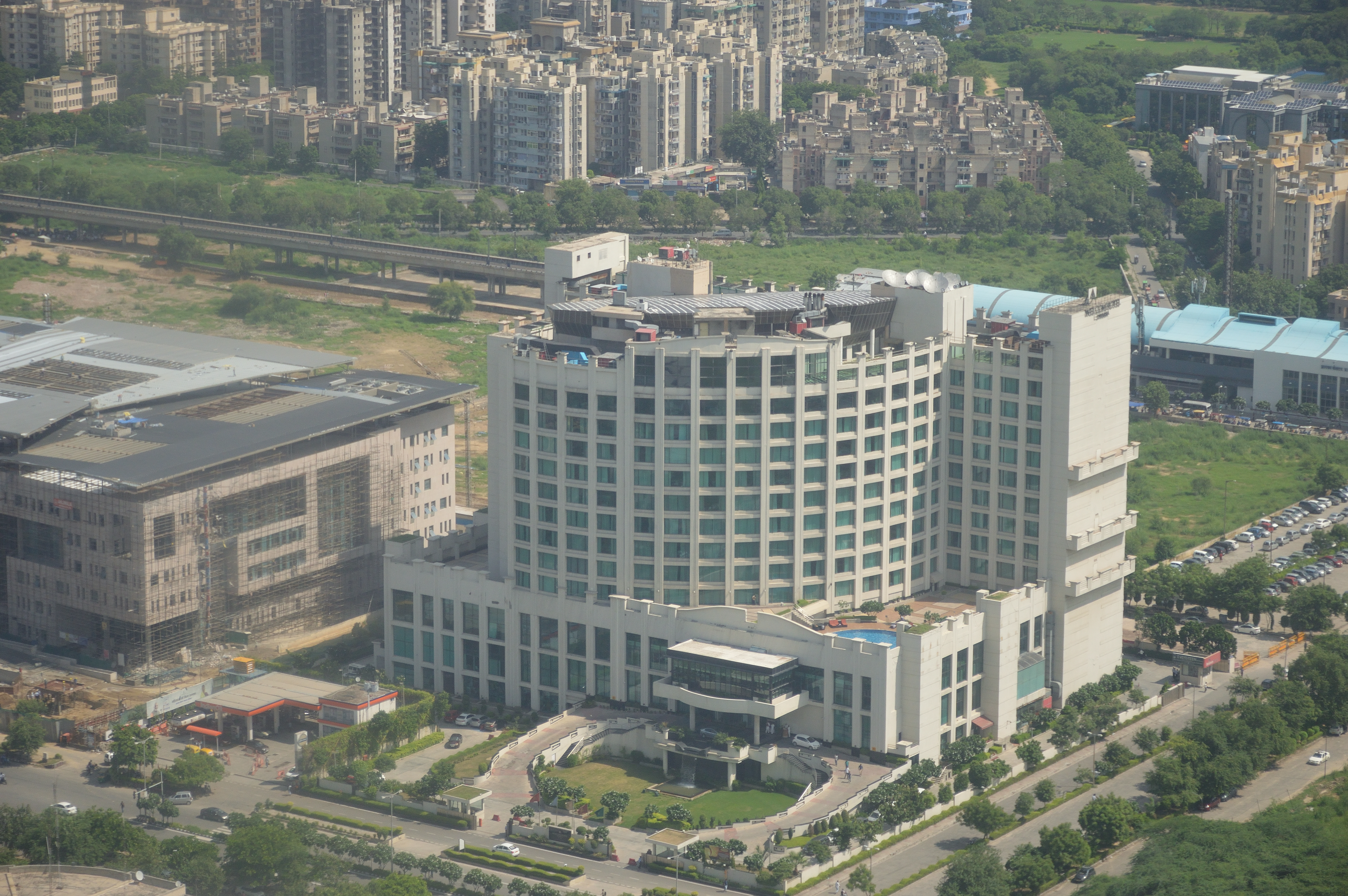
Radisson Blu Hotel and Welcome Hotel in Dwarka

The sub-city has been planned for an environment of convenience containing essential facilities and services at different levels—mainly health, education, hotel, safety and security, cultural, and communication, etc. Two malls recently opened, one at the Dwarka Sector 21 Metro Station and another near the Dwarka Sector 14 Metro Station.

== Education ==
The sub-city is well-equipped with multiple elementary and higher secondary schools.

=== Universities and colleges ===
Faculty of Law, University of Delhi is planning a new campus in Dwarka and will build hostels for students and residential quarters for staff members.

National Law University, Delhi and Netaji Subhas University of Technology are located in Dwarka. Guru Gobind Singh Indraprastha University has its main campus in Dwarka Sector 16-C, housing the University School of Law and Legal Studies and University School of Management Studies, among others. The university has around 120 affiliated colleges in the NCR.

Engineering and law institutes in Dwarka include Bhaskaracahrya College of Applied Sciences, University School of Chemical Technology, (GGSIPU) University School of Information, Communication and Technology (GGSIPU), Deen Dayal Upadhyaya College, Guru Gobind Singh Indraprastha University, Lal Bahadur Shastri Institute of Management, and National Law University, Delhi.

== See also ==
- Dhulsiras
