= Rajon Ki Baoli =

Stepwell in New Delhi, India

Rajon ki Baoli Rajon-ki-Bain
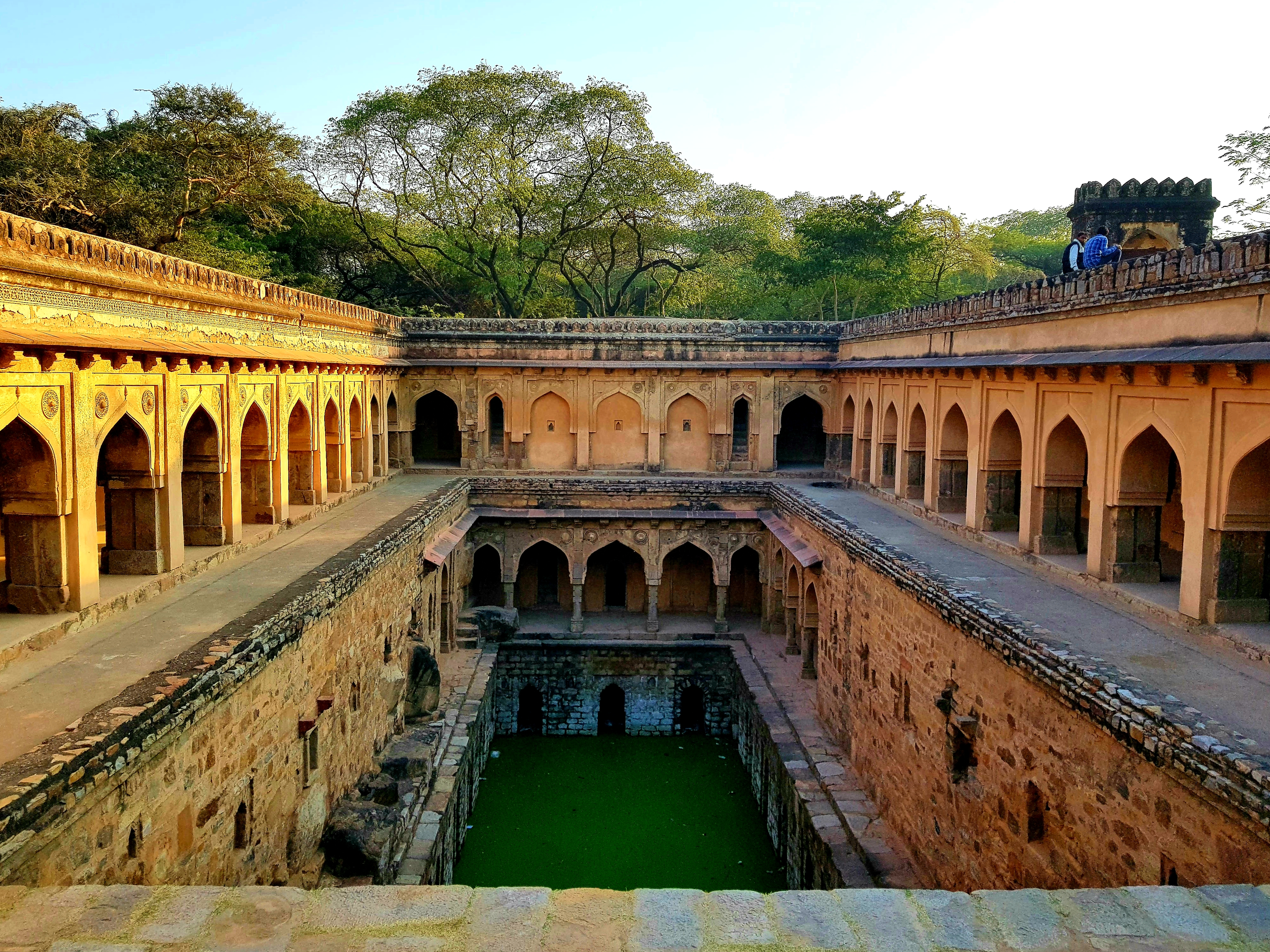
- Rajon Ki Baoli, in 2020
- Interactive map of Rajon ki Baoli; Rajon-ki-Bain
- 28°31′13″N 77°11′00″E
- Type: Stepwell
- Location: Mehrauli Archaeological Park, Delhi, India

History
- Built: 1506; 520 years ago

Site notes
- Architectural styles: Indo-Islamic; Lodi
- Restored: 2025; 1 year ago
- Restored by: Archaeological Survey of India (ASI)

Monument of National Importance
- Official name: Rajon-ki-Bain with Mosque and Chhatri
- Reference no.: N-DL-152

Rajon ki Baoli, also referred as Rajon ki Bain, is a famous stepwell in Mehrauli Archaeological Park of Delhi, India.

It was commissioned by Daulat Khan Lodi in 1506 CE, an administrator of the Lodi dynasty of the Delhi Sultanate.

The enclosure of Rajon Ki Baoli includes a mosque and a tomb.

The name Rajon Ki Baoli is derived from the 'Rajbirs' or 'Mistris' - the term used for masons. It got its name in early 20th century because of the masons that moved in permanently into the area.

From the North, the steps lead down to the water filled in the stepwell and, from the east and west sides the stepwell is enclosed by high walls. The walls have a narrow side to walk on and twelve pillars both sides that encased arched niches.

== Architecture ==
The monument gives its first impression of the medieval period. A courtyard surrounded by a verandah with many beautiful pillars, and the arches in the verandah are made in the typical north Indian fashion of that time. There is a stepwell at the center of the structure the steps leading to the stepwell are made in such a way that it gets cooler as it reaches down near the stepwell.

== Location ==
The Rajon Ki Baoli is located in the Mehrauli Archaeological Park, Jamali Kamali in the Mehrauli area of South Delhi. The site is located near the Adham Khan's Tomb and Gandhak Ki Baoli.

== Gallery ==
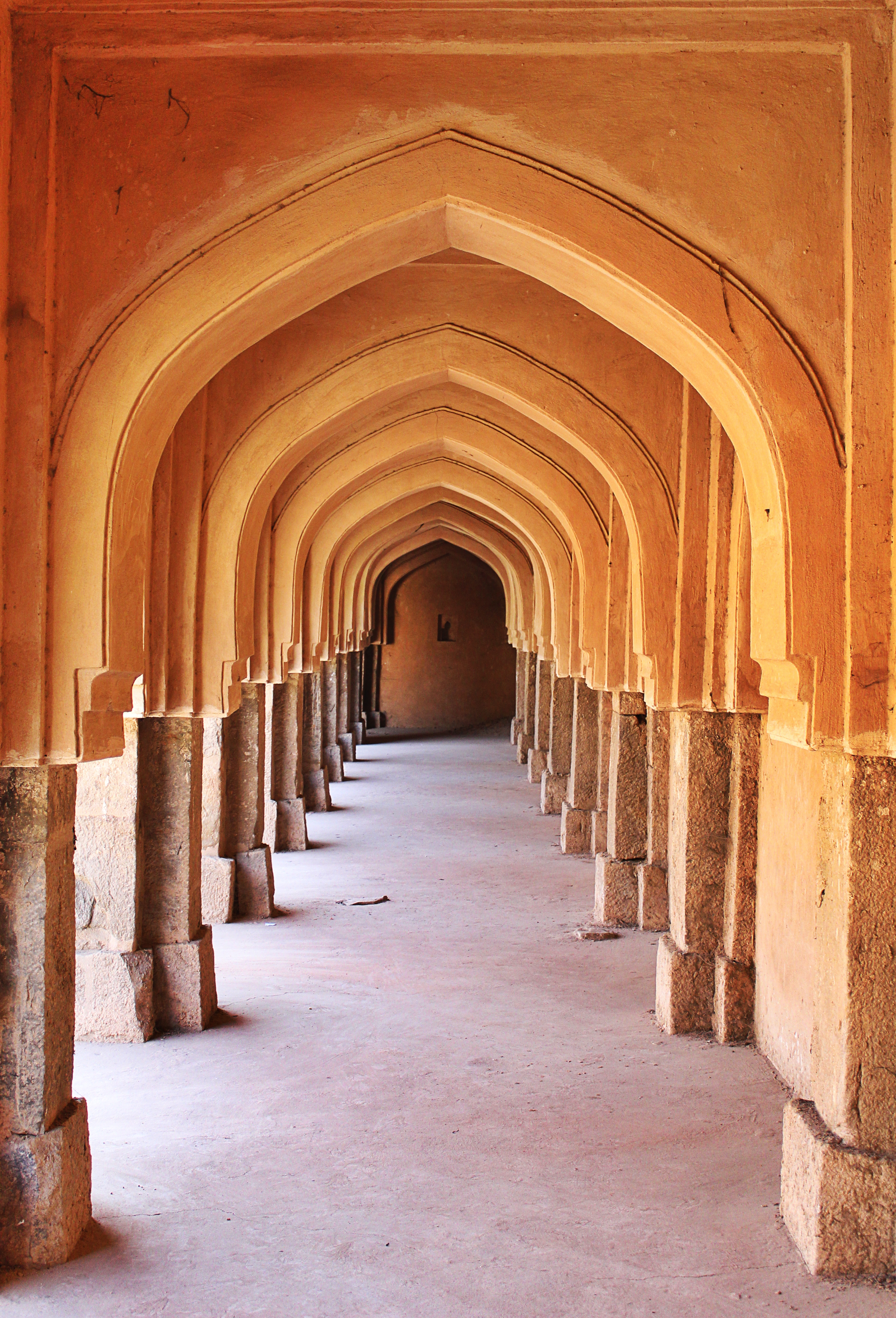
Side walls of the Baoli

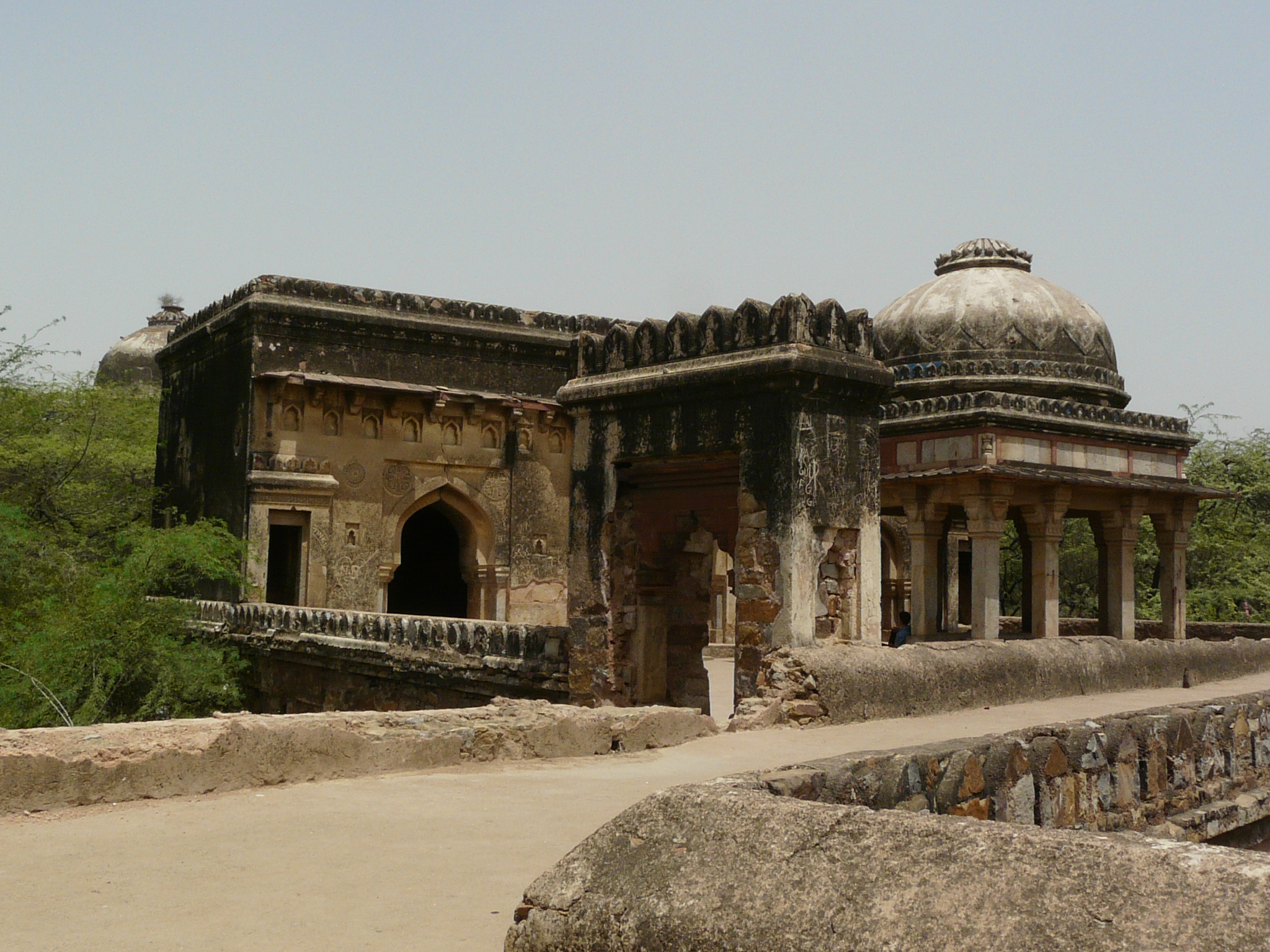
Facing the mosque and entrance, Rajon Ki Baoli

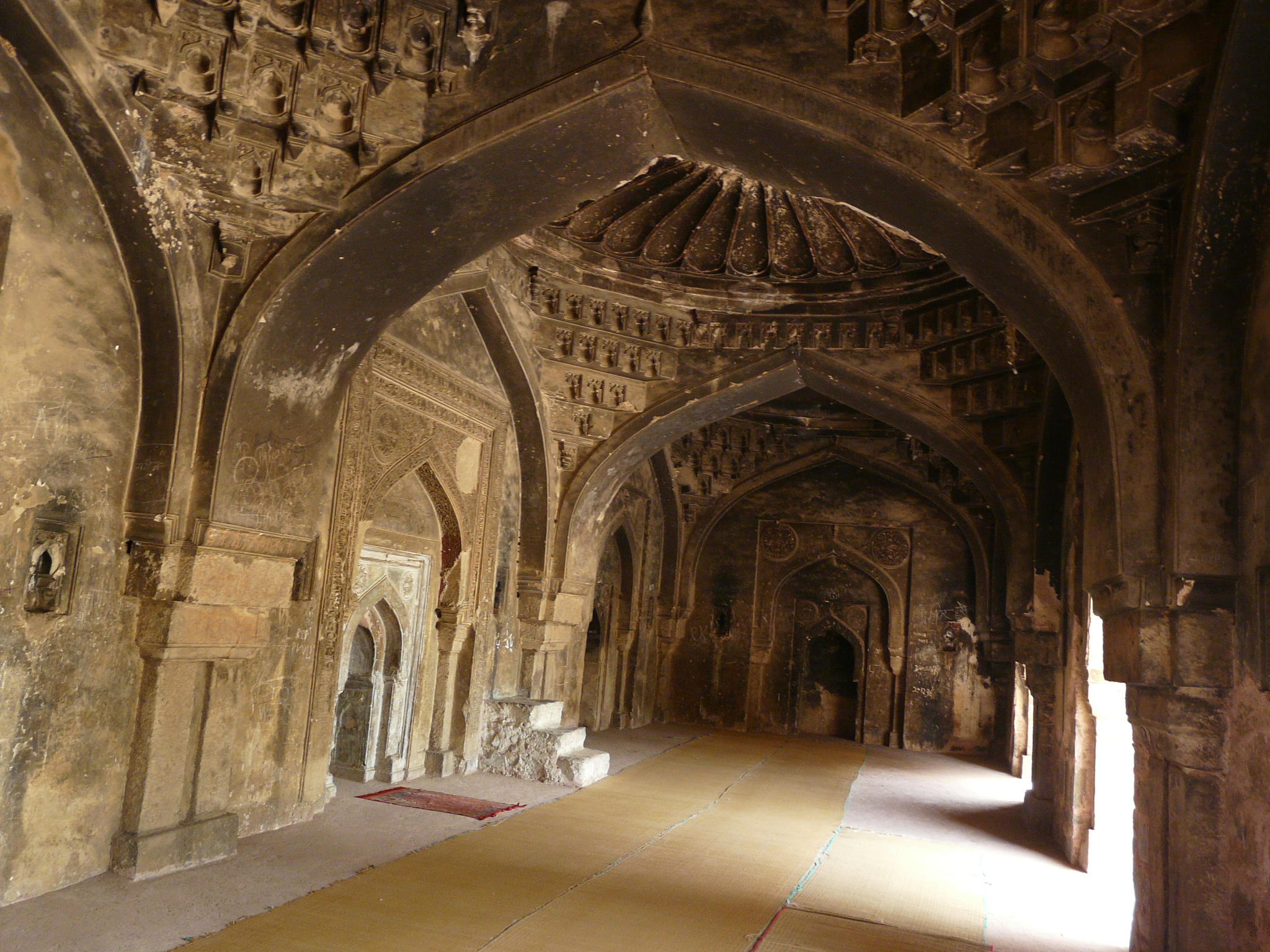
Facing the mihrab at Rajon Ki Baoli

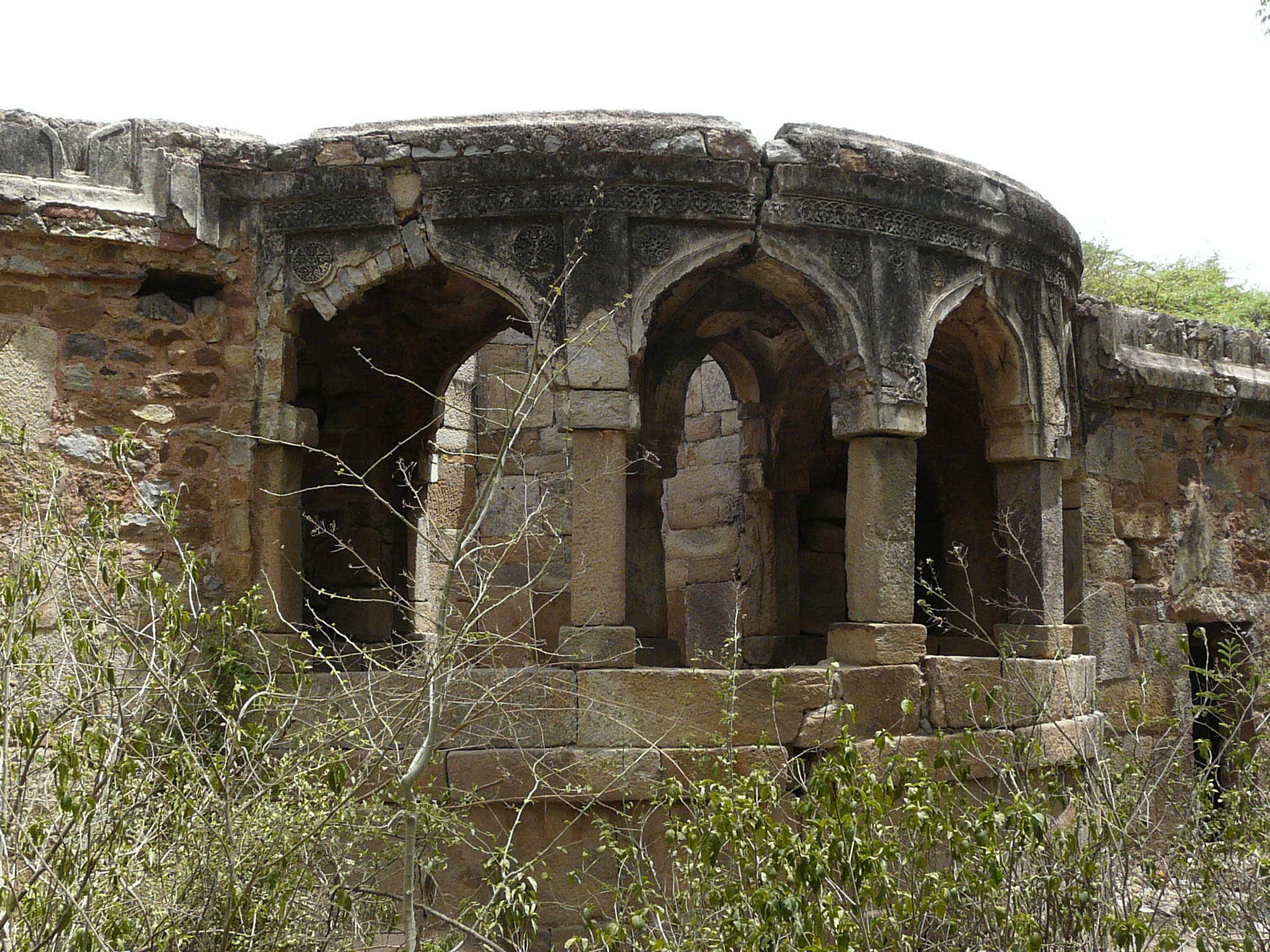
Rajon ki Baoli arcade around the well

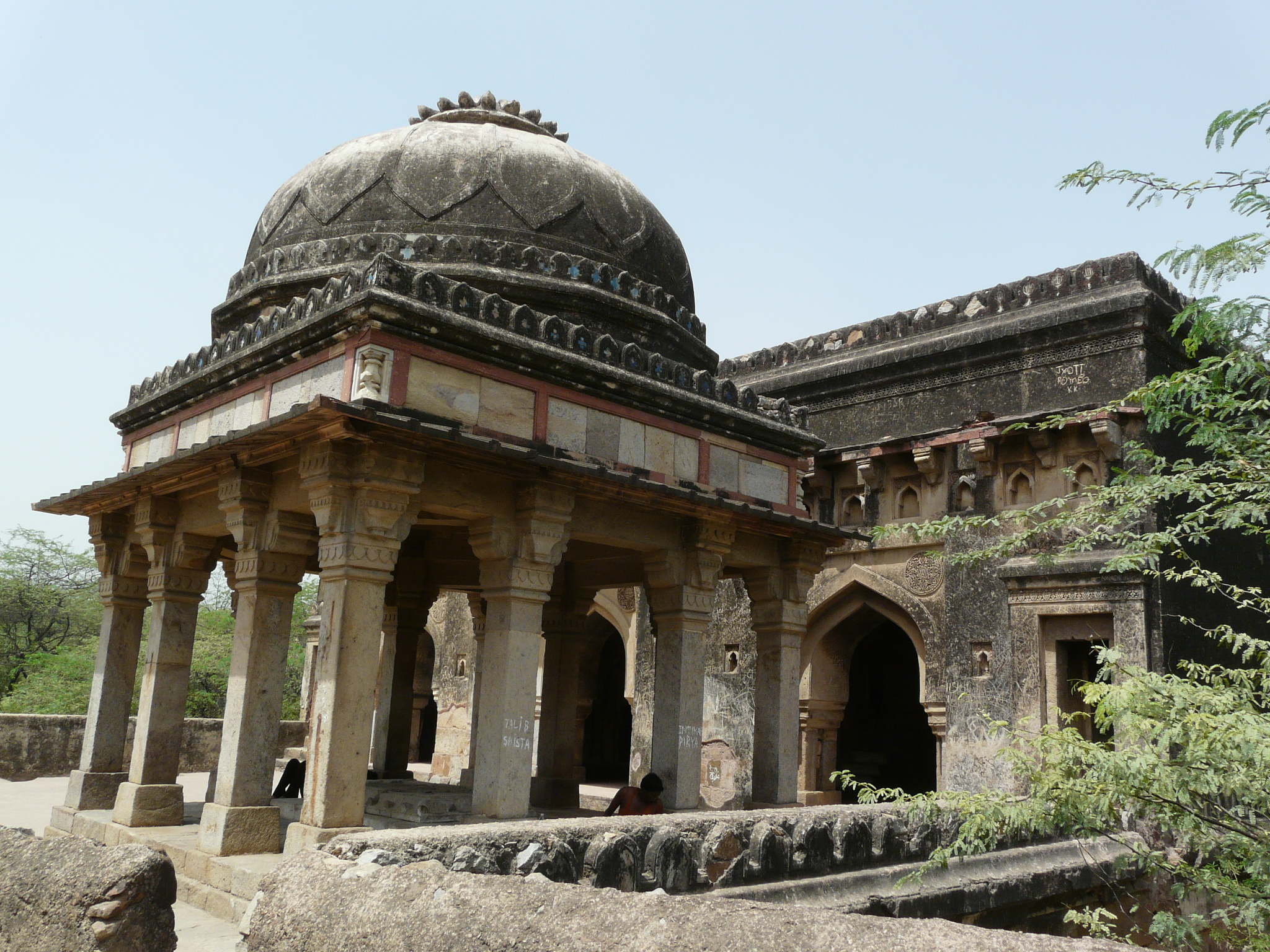
Tomb and Mosque at the baoli

== Nearby ancient monuments ==
- Jamali Kamali Mosque and Tomb, located in the Archaeological Village complex in Mehrauli, Delhi, India.
- The Tomb of Ghiyas ud din Balban is located in Mehrauli, New Delhi, India.
- Adham Khan's Tomb (Hindi: आधम खान का मकबरा, Urdu: ادھم خان کا مزار, Bangla: আধম খানের সমাধি) is the 16th-century tomb of Adham Khan, a general of the Mughal Emperor Akbar.

== See also ==
- History of Delhi
  - Paleolithic sites in & around Delhi
  - Forts and palaces of Delhi used as the capital
  - Stepwells of Delhi
- Stepwells of India
  - Rani ki vav, UNESCO heritage listed
  - List of stepwells in India by states
- History of water supply and sanitation
  - Water supply and sanitation in the Indus-Saraswati Valley Civilisation
  - Ancient water conservation techniques
