= Dhulsiras =

Urbanised village in Delhi, India

Dhool Siras or Dhul Siras is a village which is located in South-West Delhi district of National Capital Territory of Delhi, India. Dhool Siras is an urbanised village as per Delhi government's notification u/s 507. It is bounded by Dwarka Sector 25 in the East, Village Chawla in the west, Dwarka sector 19 in the North and Bamnoli Village in South.

It has a total area of 72 acres (290,000 m^{2}) and is surrounded by Lal Dora road. The settlement of Dhool Siras dates back to around 1100 AD, after it has separated from village Bharthal. It is one of the most peaceful villages in Delhi with high literacy rate and very low crime rate with about 2250 registered voters. The main source of income for the people of Dhool Siras is agriculture, Grocery Stores, Services and rent from warehouses of retail stores.

The Delhi Development Authority has various plans around the village including a golf course on the northern side of the village. A new diplomatic enclave is also planned near the village with a greater number of embassies than Chanakyapuri. The recently inaugurated Yasho Bhumi India International Convention & Expo Center for hosting exhibitions, trade fairs, and national and international summits, planned on an area of 221.37 acres, in Sector 25 will commence near the village in the near future. Phase one of the IICC will be completed in December 2023. The Airport Express (Orange Line) of Delhi Metro will extend its services to the IICC, also to benefit the village in the near future.

Apart from Metro Station (Sector 21, 4 km from Dhool Siras), International Airport (15 minutes via road or 10 minutes via road and Airport Express Metro), an inter-state bus terminal is also planned in Sector 26, Dwarka (approx. 3 km). The Dwarka Expressway will also directly benefit the residents near of Dhool Siras, which will connect Dwarka to Gurugram.
