= Arup (name) =

Arup is an Indian given name and a Dano-Norwegian surname. Notable people with the name include:

== Given name ==
- Arup Kumar Baidya (born 1987), Bangladeshi former footballer
- Arup Basak (born 1973), Indian table tennis coach and former player
- Arup Bose (born 1959), Indian statistician
- Arup Chakraborty, 21st century American engineer and MIT professor
- Arup Chakraborty (politician) (born 1956), Indian politician
- Arup Chandra (born 1951), Indian writer, poet, essayist, art critic and educator
- Arup Chatterjee, Indian politician elected in 2009
- Arup Chattopadhyay, Indian tabla player
- Arup Ratan Choudhury (born 1952), Bangladeshi dentist and media personality
- Arup Kumar Das, 21st century Indian politician
- Arup Debnath (born 1987), Indian footballer
- Arup Dhara, Indian politician elected in 2021
- Arup Kumar Goswami (born 1961), Indian retired judge, former chief justice of three high courts of India and former judge of the Gauhati High Court
- Arup Mitra, Indian economist and professor
- Arup Patnaik (born 1955), retired Indian Police Service officer and former Police Commissioner of Mumbai
- Arup Raha (born 1954), Indian Air Force air marshal, former Chief of the Air Staff of the Indian Air Force and Chairman of the Chiefs of Staff Committee
- Arup Roy (born 1956), Indian politician and Minister for Agricultural Marketing in the Government of West Bengal
- Arup SenGupta, 20th-21st century Indian environmental engineer and scientist

== Surname ==
- Erik Arup (1876–1951), Danish historian and educator
- Jens Lauritz Arup (1793–1874), Norwegian bishop and politician
- Katie Arup (born 1963), British fencer
- Ove Arup (1895–1988), Anglo-Danish engineer, founder of Arup Group
