= Education in Delhi =

Education is based on three-tier model which includes primary schools, followed by secondary and higher-secondary schools and tertiary education at universities or other higher education institutions. The Education Department of the Government of Delhi in Delhi in the National Capital Region is a premier body which looks into educational affairs. The RTE Act right to education states that children from the age of 6 to 14 have to compulsorily be educated. 25% of the seats in all private schools are also reserved for the under-privileged children. Tertiary education is administrated by the Directorate of Higher Education.

Delhi has to its credit like the Indian Institute of Technology, the All India Institute of Medical Sciences, the Indian Statistical Institute, National Institute of Technology, the School of Planning and Architecture, the Indian Agricultural Research Institute, the Indraprastha Institute of Information Technology, the Netaji Subhas University of Technology, the Delhi Technological University, for accountancy education The Institute of Chartered Accountants of India set up by an Act of Parliament in 1949, University of Delhi, Jawaharlal Nehru University, the National Law University, AJK Mass Communication Research Centre under Jamia Millia Islamia and the Indian Institute of Mass Communication.

As per the 2011 census, Delhi has a literacy rate of 86.3% with 91.0% of males and 80.9% of females.

== History ==
New Delhi has a rich history of education that dates back to ancient times. The region of Delhi has been a center of learning since the time of the Mauryan Empire, which ruled over a large part of India from 322 BCE to 185 BCE. During the Mauryan Empire, which ruled over a large part of India from 322 BCE to 185 BCE, New Delhi did not exist as a city. However, the region that now comprises Delhi and its surrounding areas was known as the Kuru kingdom, which was an important center of learning during the Mauryan period.

The Mauryan Empire was known for its emphasis on education, and the famous Mauryan Emperor Ashoka was a patron of education and supported the establishment of several universities and centers of learning throughout his empire.

During the Mughal period, the region continued to be an important center of learning, with several madrasas and other educational institutions being established. The famous Mughal Emperor Akbar was known for his support of education and established several schools and libraries. During the Mughal period, which lasted from the early 16th century to the mid-19th century, Delhi was an important center of learning and culture in India. The Mughal emperors were known for their patronage of the arts and education, and they established several schools and madrasas in Delhi and other parts of the empire.

One of the most famous educational institutions established during the Mughal period was the Madrasa-e-Azam, which was founded by Emperor Akbar in 1562. The Madrasa-e-Azam was a school for Islamic studies and was known for its high standards of education. It was located in the city of Delhi and attracted students from all over the Mughal Empire.

In addition to the Madrasa-e-Azam, several other madrasas and educational institutions were established in Delhi during the Mughal period. These institutions focused on a wide range of subjects, including theology, philosophy, mathematics, and medicine.

One of the most famous scholars of the Mughal period was Sheikh Nizamuddin Auliya, who lived in Delhi during the 14th century. Sheikh Nizamuddin Auliya was a Sufi saint and a scholar of Islamic law and theology. He founded a school for Islamic studies in Delhi, which became known as the Nizamuddin Dargah. The Nizamuddin Dargah is still an important center of learning and spiritualism in Delhi today.

Overall, the Mughal period was a time of great cultural and educational flourishing in Delhi, with the city becoming a hub of scholarship and intellectual exchange.

== Colonial period (19th-20th centuries CE) ==
In 1860-61, the North-Western Provinces education system was abolished in Delhi, and Punjab education system was introduced with opening of schools at Narela, Najafgarh, Mehrauli and their suburbs.

In the colonial era, New Delhi became a center of education for the British in India. The University of Delhi was founded in 1922 and became one of the largest universities in India. The university offered courses in a wide range of subjects and played a crucial role in the development of higher education in the country.

== Higher education ==
There are about 500,000 university students in Delhi NCR attending around more than 165 universities and colleges.

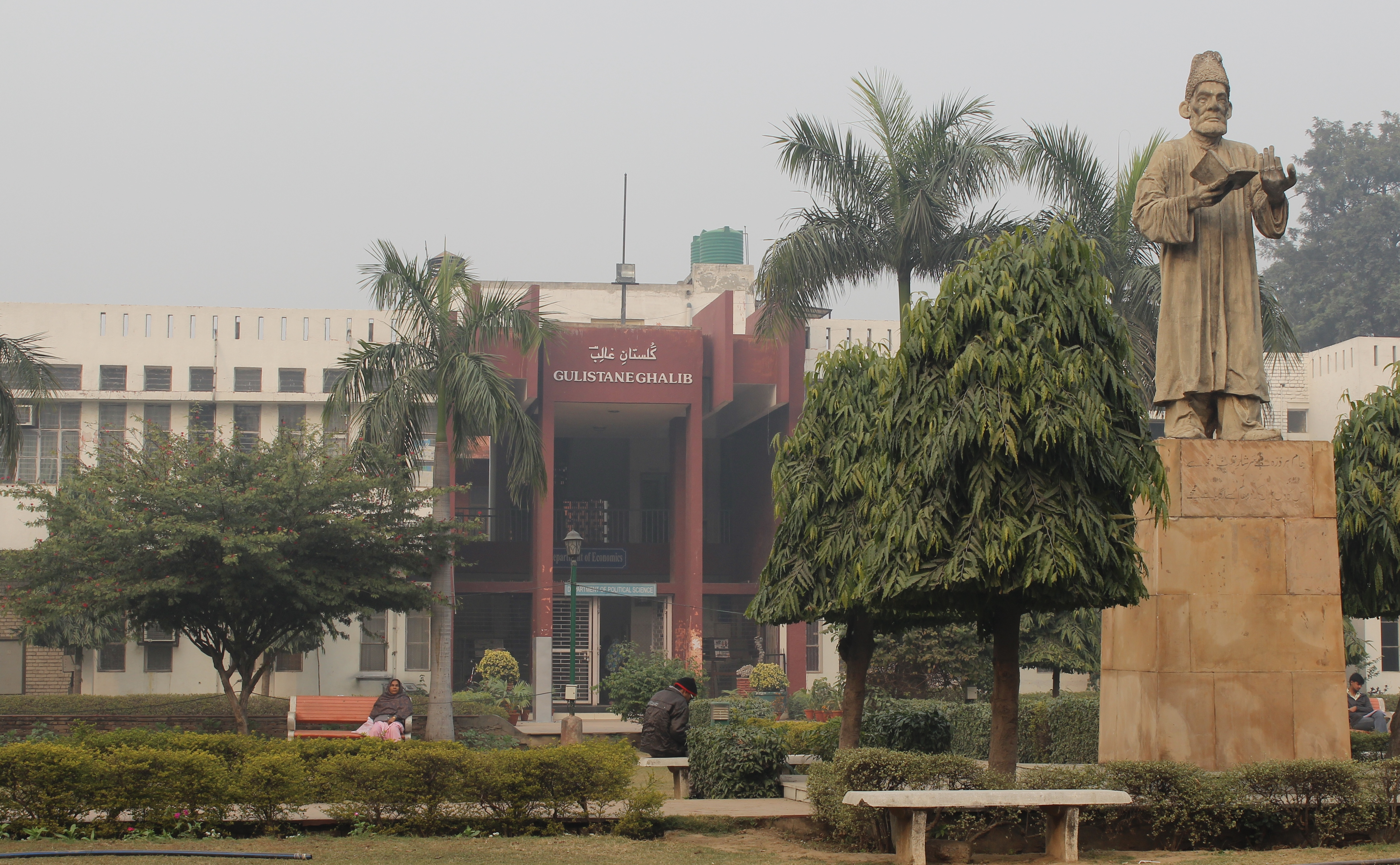
Jamia Millia Islamia, a Central University in Delhi

Delhi has fourteen major universities:

- University of Delhi: Central university
- Indian Institute of Technology, Delhi
- All India Institute of Medical Sciences, Delhi
- Indian Statistical Institute, Delhi
- National Institute of Technology, Delhi
- Indian Institute of Foreign Trade: One of the leading Business schools of India which is established by Ministry of Commerce and Industry (India).
- Indian Agricultural Research Institute
- Jamia Millia Islamia: Central university
- Delhi Technological University: State university
- Netaji Subhas University of Technology: State University
- Indira Gandhi Delhi Technical University for Women: State university
- Jawaharlal Nehru University: Central university
- Dr. B.R. Ambedkar University Delhi: State university
- Guru Gobind Singh Indraprastha University: State university
- Delhi Skill and Entrepreneurship University: State university
- National Law University: State law university
- Indira Gandhi National Open University: World's largest national university.
- Jamia Hamdard: Deemed university

=== Technical education ===
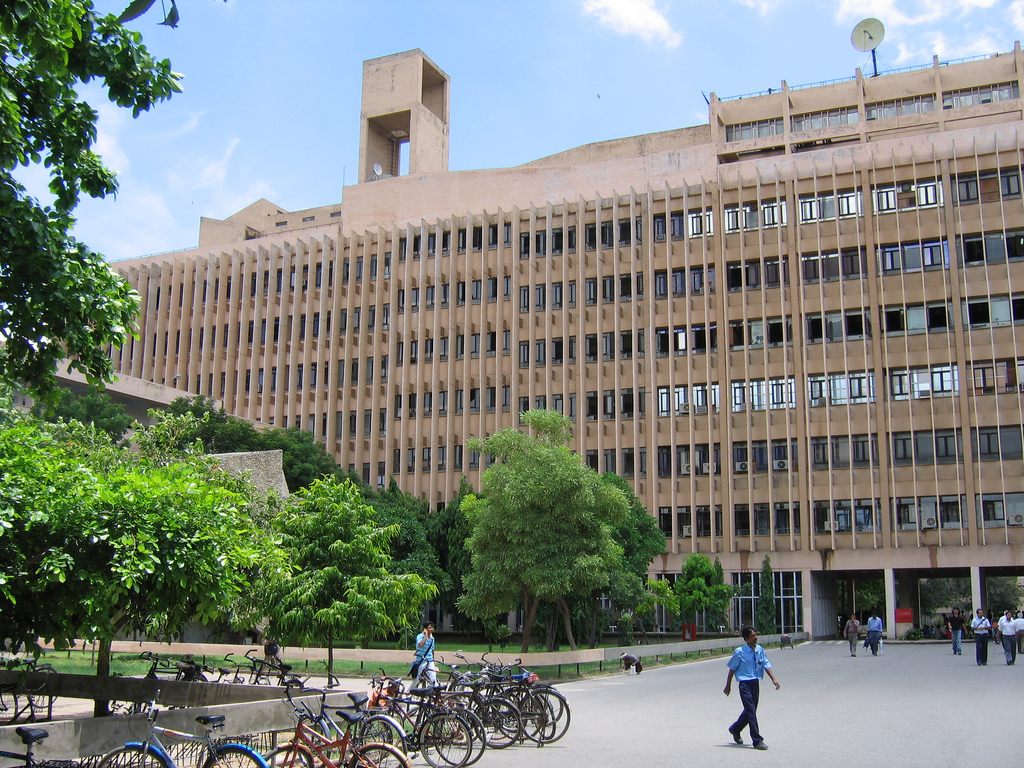
Indian Institute of Technology, Delhi was ranked as Asia's fourth-best institute in science and technology in 1999.

Delhi boasts of being home to some of the top engineering colleges in India — IIT Delhi, NIT Delhi, Indraprastha Institute of Information Technology, Netaji Subhas University of Technology, Delhi Technological University (formerly DCE), Delhi Institute of Tool Engineering (formerly TRTC) and Jamia Millia Islamia. Delhi also boasts several private and few government engineering institutions like Ambedkar Institute of Advanced Communication Technologies and Research and G. B. Pant Engineering College, New Delhi, which are usually affiliated to the Guru Gobind Singh Indraprastha University. Aiipphs University Self-Government Autonomous University, Delhi

== Industrial training institutes and centres ==
Directorate of Training and Technical Education, Govt. of NCT, has set up Industrial training institute (ITI) and industrial training centres, constituted under the Ministry of Labour and Employment, provide diploma in technical fields. There are several ITIs in Delhi NCR. Normally a person who has passed 10 standard (SSLC) is eligible for admission to an ITI. The objective of opening of ITI is provide "technical manpower to industries".

=== Polytechnic institutes and centres ===
	Name	Intake	Full Time\Part Time
1. Ambedkar Polytechnic			
2. Aryabhat Polytechnic			
3. Gobind Ballabh Pant Polytechnic			
4. Guru Nanak Dev Co-Ed Polytechnic			
5. Integrated Institute of Technology			
6. Kasturba Polytechnic for Women			
7. Meerabai Institute of Technology			
8. Pusa Polytechnic			
9. Bhai Parmanand Institute of Business Studies			
10. Delhi Institute of Tool Engineering			
11. Vardhman Mahavir Medical college and Safdarjang Hospital			

=== Architectural and Planning education ===
- School of Planning and Architecture, Delhi
- Faculty of Architecture and Ekistics, Jamia Millia Islamia

=== Medical education ===
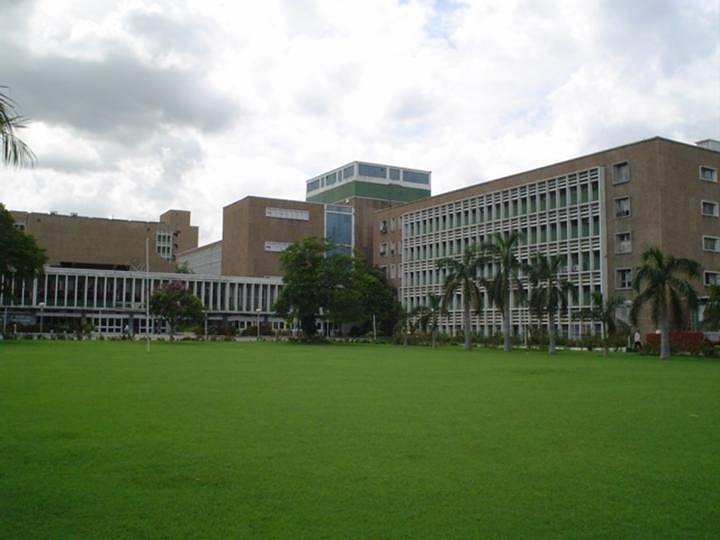
All India Institute of Medical Sciences is consistently ranked as India's top medical college

All India Institute of Medical Sciences (AIIMS) is considered amongst the best medical research and treatment centres in India. Delhi has Ten medical institutes, out of which six provide both undergraduate and postgraduate education in medicine while other two are researched based. These medical institutes are either affiliated to the University of Delhi or GGSIPU, only AIIMS is central based. Faculty of Dentistry (Jamia Millia Islamia University) and Maulana Azad Dental College (Delhi University) are some of the dental schools.

== Primary and secondary education ==
Schools in Delhi are run either by government or private sector. They are affiliated to one of three education boards: the Council for the Indian School Certificate Examinations (CISCE), the Central Board for Secondary Education (CBSE) and the National Institute of Open Schooling (NIOS).

As per a survey conducted in 2001, Delhi had some 2416 primary, 715 middle and 1576 secondary schools. In 2004–05, approximately 1.5 million students were enrolled in primary schools, 822,000 in middle schools and 669,000 in secondary schools across Delhi. Female students represented 49% of the total enrolment. The same year, the Delhi government spent between 1.58% and 1.95% of its gross state domestic product on education. Students can opt for two compulsory languages and an optional third language from the list of Scheduled languages or Foreign languages. There is a school under a metro bridge in Delhi which receives no funding or help from the government or any NGO and is run by eight volunteer teachers.

=== Happiness Curriculum ===
Happiness Curriculum is an educational program for students of grades from one to eight in the schools run by the Government of Delhi. The objective of this program is to improve mental wellbeing of students, and is based on the science of emotions. The curriculum deals with processes such as mindfulness, Social-Emotional Learning, critical thinking, problem solving and relationship building. It was launched on 2 July 2018 and about eight lakh students in over thousand schools run by the Government of Delhi have been engaged through the program as of May 2020.

=== Patriotism Curriculum ===
A Patriotism Curriculum was introduced for students of grades nursery to twelve on 28 September 2021.

== Libraries ==
There are several libraries in Delhi, which are either maintained by the government bodies or private organisations. Some of the major libraries in Delhi region are:

- American Centre Library
- British Council Library
- Delhi Public Library
- Delhi University Library
- DayalSingh Public Library
- Ramakrishna Mission Library
- IARI Library (Pusa)
- Indian Council of Historical Research
- Indian Council of Social Science Research
- Maharaja Fatehsinhrao Gaekwad Library and Documentation Centre
- Max Mueller Bhavan
- National Archives of India
- National Science Library
- Russian Centre
- Shastri Indo-Canadian Institute
- Zakir Husain Central Library, Jamia Millia Islamia University

== See also ==
- Industrial training institute
- List of educational institutions in Delhi
- List of colleges under Delhi University
- New Era Public School, Delhi
