= Arup =

Arup or ARUP may refer to:

- Arup (name), a list of people with the Indian masculine given name or Dano-Norwegian surname
- Arup Group, a multinational professional services firm
- Arup Manufacturing Corporation, an aircraft manufacturer
- ARUP Laboratories, a national reference laboratory at the University of Utah
- Angle-resolved photoemission spectroscopy

== See also ==
- Aarup, Denmark, a town
- Arupajhana, formless meditation in Buddhism
