= Universal Primary Education =

United Nations development goal

The second of the United Nations Millennium Development Goals focuses on achieving Universal Primary Education. This goal aimed to ensure global access to complete primary education for all children, regardless of gender, by 2015. Education plays a crucial role in achieving all Millennium Development Goals, as it equips future generations with the necessary tools to combat poverty and prevent diseases such as malaria and HIV/AIDS.

Despite recognizing the importance of educational investment, a joint report by the UNESCO Institute for Statistics and UNICEF titled "Fixing the Broken Promise of Education for All: Findings from the Global Initiative on Out-of-School Children" revealed that the 2015 target for universal primary education was not met. The report indicated that as of 2015, approximately 58 million children of primary school age worldwide were not receiving formal education.

== Achieving universal primary education ==
Since 1999, there has been great progress towards achieving universal primary enrollment due in large part to a pursuit of the Millennium Development Goals (MDGs) and the Education for All (EFA). The number of primary school-age children who are out of school has dropped by 42% between 2000 and 2012, despite rapid population growth. Greater than half of countries and regions worldwide have a net enrolment rate of more than 95% and either already have or are close to achieving universal primary education. However, despite an increase in enrollment over the past decade, global progress has stalled since 2007, and net enrolment or attendance is less than 80 percent in about 20 countries. Of the 58 million children out of school:

- 23% attended school in the past but left
- 43% are likely to never enter school
- 34% are likely to enter school in the future

Roughly half of all out-of-school children come from just a few countries, many of them characterized by conflict, instability, and extreme poverty. West and Central Africa is home to one-third of all primary school-age out-of-school children, making it the region with the lowest rates of school participation. Challenges to achieving universal primary education are exacerbated in unstable regions, as they have greater difficulty in accessing financial support.

The barriers which prevent children around the world from obtaining primary-level education are diverse and require tailored responses. Children living in conflict-affected areas account for "Just 20% of the world's children of primary school age but 50% of the world's out-of-school children." Additionally, inequalities in wealth significantly impact out-of-school rates. In many countries, children from the poorest 20 per cent of the population are less likely to attend school than those who are better off. Despite overall improvements, girls continue to be at a disadvantage as 53%—more than half—of the estimated 58 million primary age out-of-school-children, are girls. A research paper published in December 2019 found that in 2017, 1 in 6 women aged 20–24 had not completed primary school.

== Factors contributing to lack of access and poor attendance ==
=== Location (climate) ===
Location contributes to children's lack of access to primary education. In certain areas of the world, it is more difficult for children to get to school. For example, in high-altitude areas of India, poor weather conditions for more than 7 months of the year make school attendance erratic and force children to remain at home.

In these remote areas, lack of funds contributes to low attendance rates by creating undesirable and unsafe learning environments. In 1996, the General Accounting Office (GAO) reported that poor weather conditions existed in many rural areas; one out of every two rural schools had at least one inadequate structural or mechanical feature. In these situations where regular school attendance is rare, a low population contributes to the problem. In other locations, large numbers are often the cause of low attendance rates.

Due to population growth, many urban schools have expanded their boundaries making school transportation more complicated. "For over 50 years, the U.S. has been shifting away from small neighborhood schools to larger schools in lower density areas. Rates of children walking and biking to school have become low significantly over this period". There is evidence to prove that the distance to and from school contributes to a child's attendance or lack of attendance. In a study done while investigating the relationship between location (distance) and school attendance in Mali, about half of the villages reported that the school was too far away for students to enroll.

There is still a supposition as to whether primary schools are more accessible in rural areas or urban areas because situations differ depending on geographic location. In a study examining the correlation between location and school attendance in Argentina and Panama, researchers found that urban residence was positively correlated with school attendance, but another study in a Louisiana school district found that schools with the lowest attendance rates were in metropolitan areas.

=== Gender ===
Gender contributes to a child's lack of access and attendance to education. Although it may not be an obvious problem today. Gender equality in education has been an issue for a long time. Many investments in girls' education in the twentieth century addressed the widespread lack of access to primary education in developing countries.

Out-of-school rates and numbers, 2014: Data from UNESCO Institute for Statistics database
Region	Out-of-school rate (%)			Out-of-school number (millions)		
	Both sexes	Male	Female	Both sexes	Male	Female
Caucasus and Central Asia	5.7	5.4	6.1	0.3	0.3	0.2
Developed regions	3.1	3.4	2.9	2.3	1.3	1.1
Eastern Asia	3.0	3.0	3.0	2.9	1.6	1.4
Latin America and the Caribbean	6.0	6.2	5.8	3.6	1.9	1.7
Northern Africa	0.9	1.0	0.7	0.2	0.1	0.1
Oceania (2013)	11.5	8.9	14.3	0.2	0.1	0.1
South-Eastern Asia	5.2	5.3	5.1	3.3	1.7	1.6
Southern Asia	6.2	5.8	6.8	11.4	5.5	5.9
Sub-Saharan Africa	21.2	19.2	23.3	34.2	15.6	18.6
Western Asia	10.7	7.8	13.7	2.6	1.0	1.6
World	8.9	8.1	9.7	60.9	28.9	32.1

Boys not in education outnumber girls in the majority of regions. In 2014, girls outnumber boys in regions with the worst attendance, especially in Sub-Saharan Africa, resulting in the total number of girls out of education being approximately 11% higher than the number of boys out of education world-wide.

In 25 countries, the proportion of boys enrolling in secondary school is higher than girls by 10% or more and in five countries (India, Nepal, Togo, Turkey and Yemen), the gap exceeds 20%. Enrollment is low for both boys and girls in sub-Saharan Africa, with rates of just 27% and 22% respectively. It is generally believed that girls are often discouraged from attending primary schooling (especially in less developed countries) for religious and cultural reasons, but there is little evidence available to support this assumption. However, there is evidence to prove that the disparity of gender in education is real. Today, some 78% of girls drop out of school compared with 48% of boys.

== Cost ==
Cost is a significant factor affecting access to and attendance in primary education, particularly in developing countries. It encompasses various expenses such as tuition, room and board, and other fees associated with schooling.

=== Opportunity costs ===
High opportunity costs often influence the decision of children to attend school. For example, UNICEF estimates that 121 million children of primary school age are kept out of school to work in fields or at home. For many families in developing countries, the economic benefits of not attending primary school can outweigh the perceived benefits of education.

=== Direct costs ===
Besides opportunity costs, school fees can be prohibitively expensive, especially for poor households. In rural China, for instance, families may dedicate as much as a third of their income to school fees.

The relationship between school fees and attendance is complex. While official statistics in China report a low dropout rate, some experts question these figures, noting that dropout rates in rural areas appear to be much higher.

=== Other factors ===
Unemployment among parents can also contribute to children's inability to attend school. When jobs are scarce and parents struggle to meet basic needs like food, education often becomes a lower priority. The cost of education varies significantly depending on whether the school is public or private.;./... Public schools are generally less expensive because their needs are mostly covered by government funding, unlike private schools which rely on tuition from families. Even when schooling is relatively inexpensive, some families still struggle to afford associated costs such as:

- Food
- Transportation
- Uniforms
- Tuition fees
- School supplies

While the exact relationship between cost and attendance rates is not fully understood, there is substantial evidence that cost is a significant factor affecting children's access to and attendance in primary education.

=== Language ===
In developing countries throughout the world, the educational context is characterized not by monolingual settings but rather multilingual settings. Often, children are asked to enroll in a primary school where the Medium of Instruction (MI) is not their home language but rather the language of the government or another dominant society. Children who are taught their mother tongue at an early age tend to have the ability to communicate with outsiders who understand it too. In most cases, the mother tongue is commonly spoken by people living in the same community or region. The language introduced to a child at a tender age makes it easier for the child to learn faster if taught in that language. Learning another language of a dominant society as a child can make it difficult for the child to understand, thereby causing lack of attendance in school.

Studies throughout the world demonstrate the importance of the Medium of Instruction in determining a child's educational attainment. According to Mehrotra (1988):

In a situation where the parents are illiterate, if the medium of instruction in school is a language that is not spoken at home then the problems of learning in an environment characterized by poverty are compounded and the chances of drop-out increase correspondingly. In this context, the experience of the high-achievers has been unequivocal: Firstly, the mother tongue was used as the medium of instruction at the primary level in all cases and there are many researches which show that students learn to read more quickly when taught in their mother tongue. Secondly, students who have learned to read in their mother tongue tend to learn to read in a second language more quickly than those who are first taught to read in the second language. Thirdly, in terms of academic learning skills, students taught to read in their mother tongue acquire such skills more quickly.

(See also Multilingual Education)

== Education and global health ==
Education is a crucial factor in ending global poverty. With education, employment opportunities are broadened, income levels are increased and child health is improved.

In areas where access, attendance and quality of education have seen improvements, there has been an increase in the healthiness of the community in general. In fact, children of educated mothers are 50% more likely to live past the age of five. Not only does education improve individual and family health but it also improves the health of the community. In countries with solid education system in place, there are lower crime rates, greater economic growth and improved social services.

== School feeding programs ==
The World Bank defines school feeding programs as a targeted social safety net that provides educational and health benefits to vulnerable children, aims to increase attendance rates, decreases absenteeism, and improves nutrition at the household level.

"There are approximately 300 million chronically hungry children in the world. One hundred million of them do not attend school and two third of those not attending leads to low rates of attendance. World Food Programme's school feeding formula is simple: food attract hungry children to school and education broadens their options helping to lift them out of poverty."

— World Food Programme

One successful method to ensuring that children attend school on a regular basis is through school feeding programs. Many different organizations fund school feeding programs, among them the World Food Programme and the World Bank. The idea of a school feeding program is that children are provided with meals at school with the expectation that they will attend school regularly. School feeding programs have succeeded because the food that children receive at school can be a critical source of nutrition. School meals have helped to improve concentration and performance of children in school.

Another aspect of school feeding programs is take home rations. When, for economic reasons, there is a need to care for the elderly or a family member suffering from HIV, or cultural beliefs keep a parent from sending their child (especially a female child) to school, these take home rations provide incentives to send children to school rather than to work.

== Current efforts ==
=== Global Campaign for Education ===
This organization promotes education as a basic human right. It motivates people and groups to put public pressure on governments and the international community in order to assure that all children are provided with free compulsory public education. It brings together major NGOs and Teachers Unions in over 120 countries to work in solidarity towards their vision of universal primary education.

=== Right to Education Project ===
The Right to Education Project aims to promote social mobilization and legal accountability, looking to focus on the legal challenges to the right to education. To ensure continued relevance and engagement with activists and the academic community, the Project also undertakes comparative research to advance an understanding of the right to education.

=== UNICEF ===
In working with local, national and international partners, UNICEF's work supports the attainment of universal primary education.

=== Oxfam International ===
This organization is a confederation of 12 organizations that are dedicated to reducing poverty and eliminating injustices in the world. Oxfam works on a grassroots level in countries around the world to ensure that all people have access to basic human rights, including the right to education.

=== Save the Children ===
This organization advocates education as a way for individuals to escape poverty. They are running a campaign entitled "Rewrite the Future" to encourage American citizens in position of power and wealth to take action against the injustices in education system around the world. Save the Children also operates educational programs in 30 countries all over the world.

=== Peace Corps ===
This United States government organization has volunteers on the ground in 75 countries. Many of the volunteers are working as teachers in rural areas or working to promote and improve access to education in the areas in which they are stationed.

=== United Nations Educational Scientific and Cultural Organization ===
UNESCO works to improve education through projects, advice, capacity-building and networking. UNESCO's Education for All Campaign by 2015 is the driving force in UNESCO's work in the field of education at the moment.

=== World Bank ===
This organization provides financial and technical assistance to developing countries. Loans and grants from the World Bank provide much of the funding for educational projects around the world including but not limited to school feeding programs.

=== Child Aid ===
Child Aid conducts school and library based reading programs in over 50 indigenous villages in Guatemala, where literacy rates are lower than anywhere in Latin America. Through its literacy development programing, it helps teachers and librarians create and improve community libraries and deliver 10,000 children's books annually.

=== World Food Programme ===
The World Food Programme provides food assistance to people in need and supports school meal programmes around the world.

=== Food and Agriculture Organization of the United Nations ===
This organization runs a campaign titled '"Education for Rural People" in which they work to ensure education for rural people as the key to reduce poverty, encourage food security and promote sustainable development.

=== Global Partnership for Education ===
The Global Partnership for Education was launched in 2002 as the Fast Track Initiative. It was designed as a major initiative to help countries achieve the Millennium Development Goals (MDGs) of Universal Primary Education (UPE) by 2015. It was endorsed by the Development Committee of the World Bank as a process that would provide quick and incremental technical and financial support to countries that have policies but are not on track to attain Universal Primary Education by 2015.

In 2011, the organization re-committed to achieve education for all children through their transformation into the Global Partnership for Education.

== See also ==
- Education
- Education For All
- Human Rights
- Millennium Development Goals
- Right to Education
- Learning crisis
