= Arup Mitra =

Indian academician

- Education: MA Economics , M. Phil., Ph. D , Delhi School of Economics; Post Doctorate (1995), Northwestern University, USA

Arup Mitra is an Indian economist and academician, currently serving as the Professor of Economics, South Asian University, New Delhi and previously served as Director General of National Institute of Labour Economics Research and Development (IAMR), an autonomous Institute under NITI Aayog).

His research interests include development economics, labour and welfare, industrial productivity growth and employment, urban development, and gender inequality. He authored in Encyclopaedia of Life Support Systems (EOLSS) Mathematical Models in Economics, developed under UNESCO, Encyclopaedia of Sustainability. and the Handbook of Labour, Human Resources and Population Economy. Arup Mitra received the Mahalanobis Memorial Gold Medal from the Indian Econometric Society for his outstanding contributions to quantitative economics. In 2019, he was awarded the Professor S. R. Sen Best Book Award for his book, Insights into Inclusive Growth, Employment and Wellbeing in India, recognizing the analysis of employment dynamics and poverty reduction strategies.

== Early life and career ==
Arup Mitra completed his MA in Economics , M. Phil. and Ph.D from Delhi School of Economics. His title for the PhD thesis was Urbanisation, Slums and Informal Sector: Interconnections and Interregional Variations. Thereafter he also obtained a Post Doctorate Degree from Northwestern University Evanston, USA (1995). His supervisor was Professor Edwin S. Mills and the title of the work was "Urban Development and Urban Ills."

He previously worked as a Professor of Economics at the Institute of Economic Growth (IEG), Delhi. He also served as the Director General of NILERD, Government of India. He held the Indian Economy Chair at Sciences Po. Paris, worked as a senior researcher at ILO (Geneva) and served as visiting fellow/professor in many organizations including Nagoya University and Institute of Developing Economies, Japan.

Arup served as a member of various committees such as the Chairman of the Technical Advisory Committee for City GDP Estimation, Ministry of Housing and Urban Affairs, Government of India, member of Expert Group Annual Employment-Unemployment Survey by Labour Bureau, Ministry of Labour and Employment, Government of India and pursued research projects sponsored by WHO and many other organisations including World Bank, ILO and ADB.

He has authored a large number of research papers in various reputed journals, both international and national, and edited volumes. Besides, he has several books to his credit. He is also on editorial board of various journals such as Indian Journal of Labour Economics, editorial board member of International Journal of Sustainable Development Research and other journals.

== Books ==
Some of the books, he has authored and coauthored, include the following:

- Barriers to Employment: Impact of Macro, Individual and Enterprise-level Variables, Springer Brief, 2023, ISBN 978-9819945696
- Urban Headway and Upward Mobility in India, Cambridge University Press, 2020. ISBN 9781108496360
- Climate change, Livelihood Diversification and well-being: The case of rural Odisha" Springer Brief, 2021. (jointly with Saudamini Das and others) ISBN 978-981-16-7048-0
- Labour Force Participation in India, Springer Brief in Economics, Springer, 2018 (jointly with Aya Okada), ISBN 978-9811071430.
- Corruption and Development in Indian Economy, Cambridge University Press, 2016. (jointly with Chandan Sharma) ISBN 9781107152670
- Industry-led Growth: Issues and Facts, Springer Brief in Economics, Springer, 2016. ISBN 978-9811000072
- Insight into Inclusive Growth, Employment and Wellbeing in India, Springer, 2013. ISBN 978-81-322-0655-2
- Occupational Choices, Networks and Transfers: An Exegesis Based on Micro Data from Delhi Slums, Manohar Publishers, New Delhi, 2003. ISBN 81-7304-483-X
- Urban Development and Urban Ills, Commonwealth Publishers, New Delhi, 1997, (Jointly with Edwin S. Mills). ISBN 9788171693993
- Urbanisation, Slums, Informal Sector Employment and Poverty: An Exploratory Study B.R. Pub. Corp. (D.K. Pub. and Dist.), Delhi, 1994. ISBN 817018830X

Some of the books he has edited include:

- Youth in Indian Labour Market: Issues, Challenges and Policies, Springer, 2024. ISBN 978-9819703784.
- Economic Growth in India and Its Many Dimensions, Orient BlackSwan, 2018. ISBN 9789352870875
- Studies in Macro Economics and Welfare, Academic Foundation, Delhi, 2005 (jointly with B. B. Bhattacharya). ISBN 817188461X

He has also authored books published in English Literature such as Awakening, (ISBN 8171695078), In Search of the Lotus-feet (ISBN 978-8126901753), Light on the Lotus ( ISBN 978-8189973018), Poverty Profile (ISBN 978-9380009612), A Letter to Mother: From Destruction to Construction (ISBN 978-8126901463), Spread the Wings: Globalising India (ISBN 978-9386487728), and Convergence of Diversity (ISBN 978-9349315099)other books.
