= National Institute of Technology Delhi =

Indian premier public technical university

Coordinates: 28.8161°N 77.1336°E

National Institute of Technology, Delhi
- Type: Public technical university
- Established: 2010; 16 years ago
- Academic affiliations: Ministry of Education, Government of India
- Chairperson: C. K. Birla
- Director: Dr. Ajay K. Sharma
- Location: Plot No. FA7, Zone P1, GT Karnal Road, Delhi, India
- Campus: 51 acres (21 ha); Urban
- Language: English
- Website: nitdelhi.ac.in

The National Institute of Technology Delhi (NIT Delhi) is an Institute of National Importance, established in 2010 by the Ministry of Education, Government of India. As one of the 31 NITs across the country, NIT Delhi is mandated to provide education and research in engineering and technology. The institute offers undergraduate, postgraduate, and doctoral programs, interdisciplinary collaboration, and entrepreneurial spirit among students.

== History ==
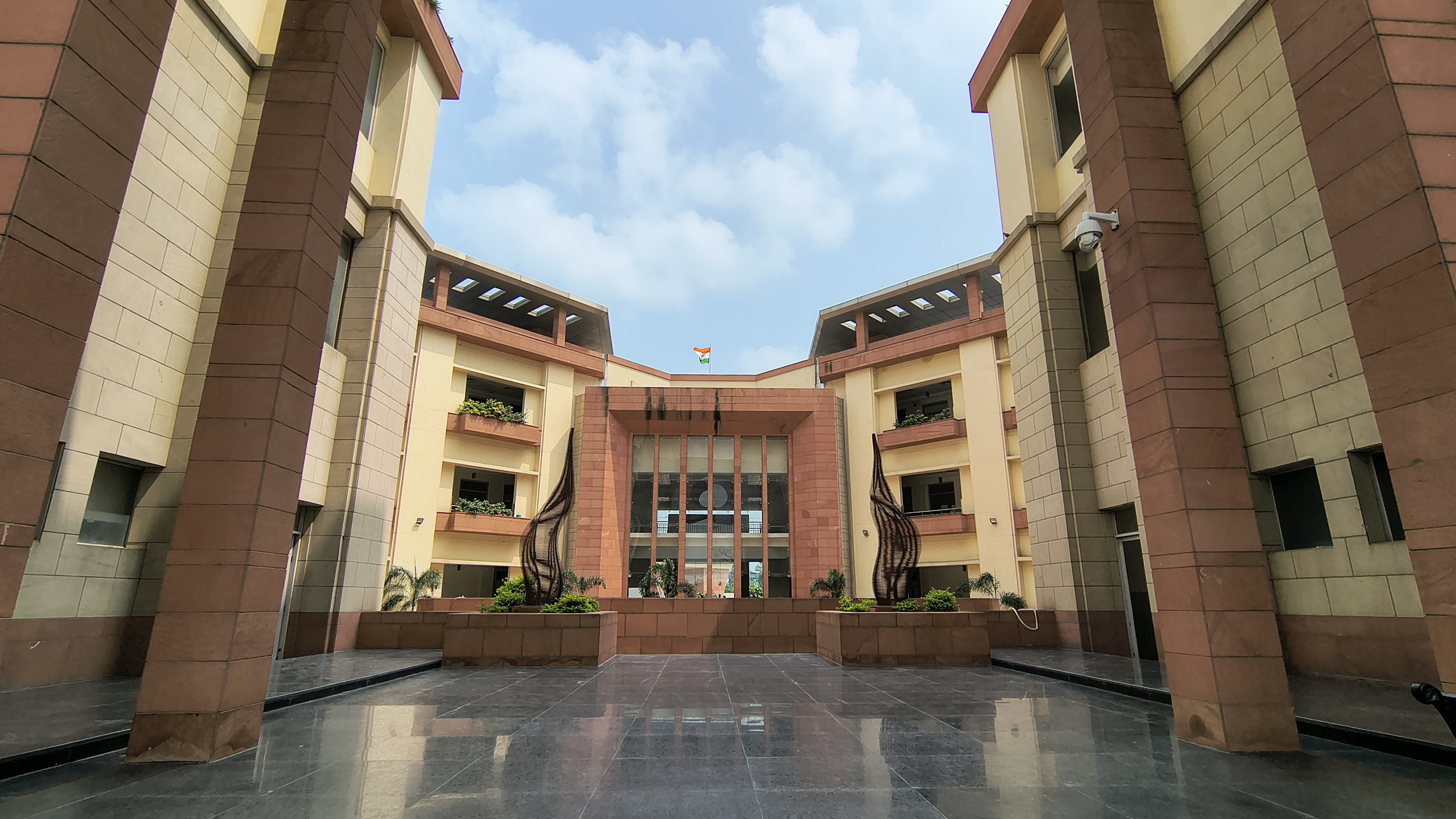
Main Campus

National Institute of Technology Delhi (NIT Delhi) was established as one of the ten National Institutes of Technology (NITs) during India's 11th Five-Year Plan by the Ministry of Education in the year 2010 through an Act of Parliament as one of India's 31 National Institute of Technology. granting its the status of an Institute of National Importance. The inaugural B.Tech cohort (CSE, ECE, EEE) was admitted for the 2010-11 session while the institute operated under the mentorship of NIT Warangal. Academic activities began on that campus and then shifted to a temporary site in Dwarka, Delhi (June 2012). A second interim move took place in February 2014 to the IAMR campus, Narela. Full operations started from the purpose-built permanent campus on GT Karnal Road, Narela, in February 2022.

For the 2013–2014 academic year, the intake for each undergraduate programme was increased to 60 students. During the same academic year, a Master of Technology programme in Electronics and Communication Engineering was introduced, with an initial intake of 15 students. A PhD programme commenced in January 2014, admitting seven research scholars in its first cohort. A Master of Technology programme in Power Electronics and Drives with an intake of 15 students was started during the academic session of 2017-2018.

== Campus ==
=== Permanent campus ===
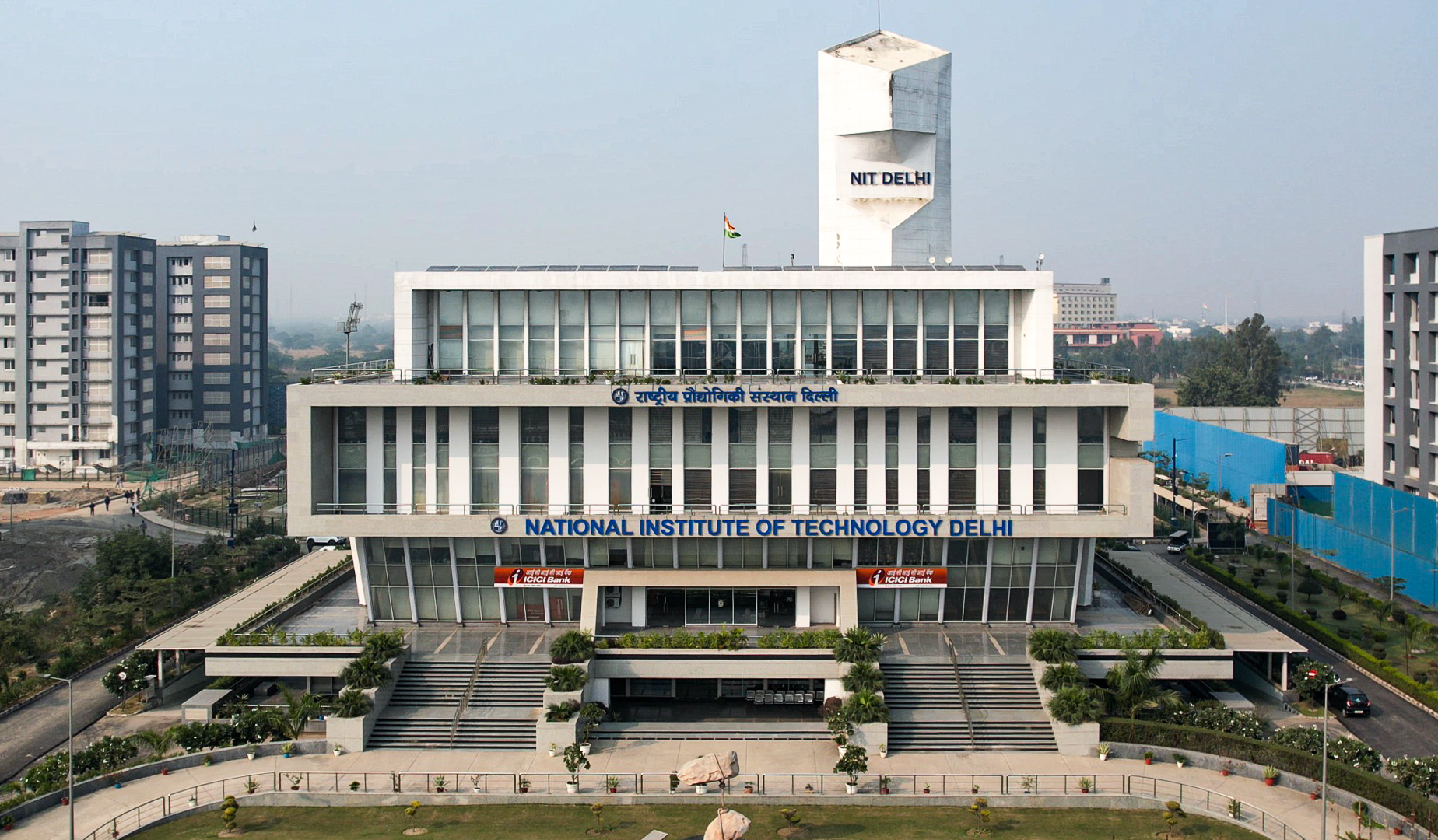
The admin block

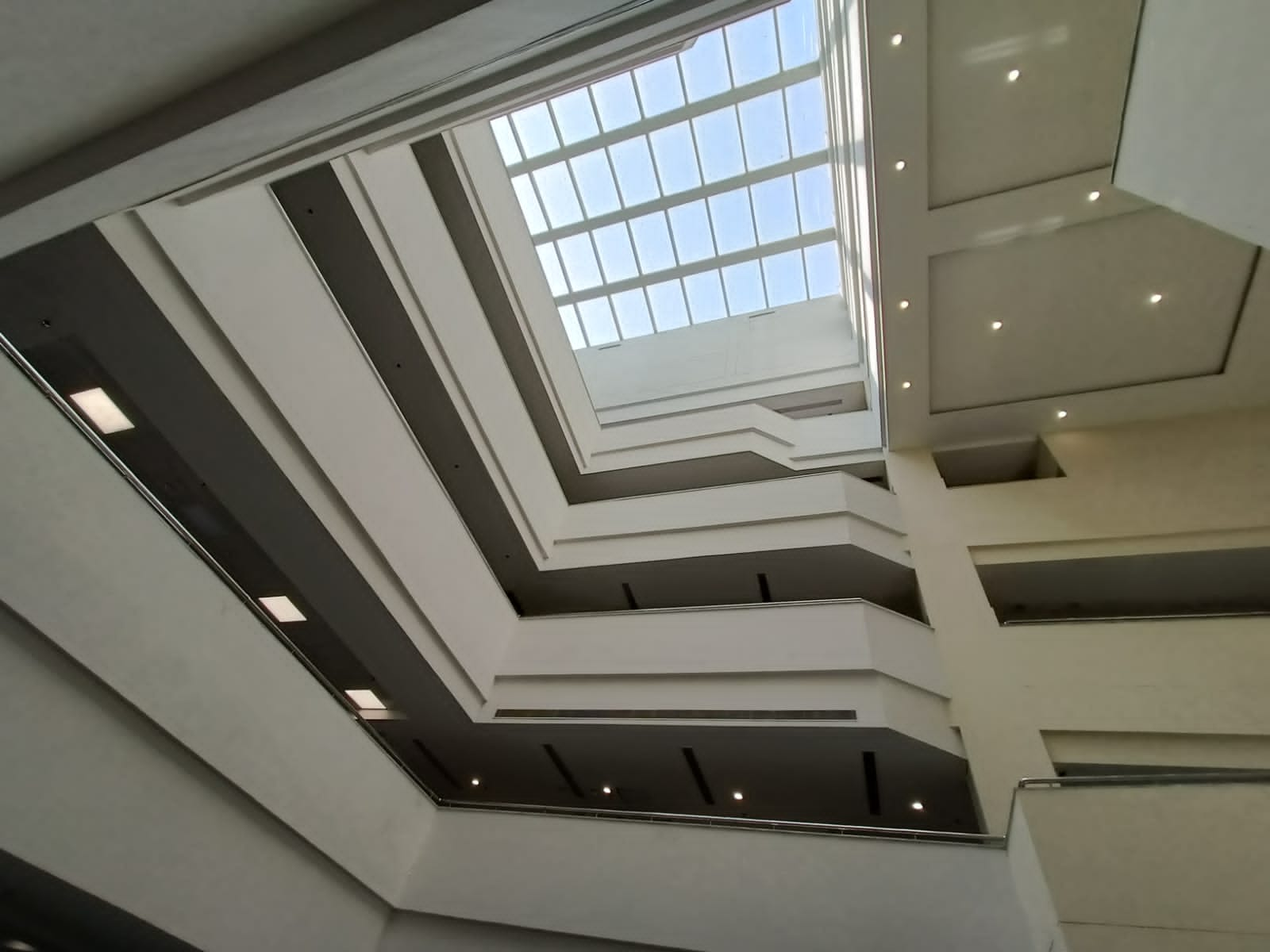
NIT Delhi new campus

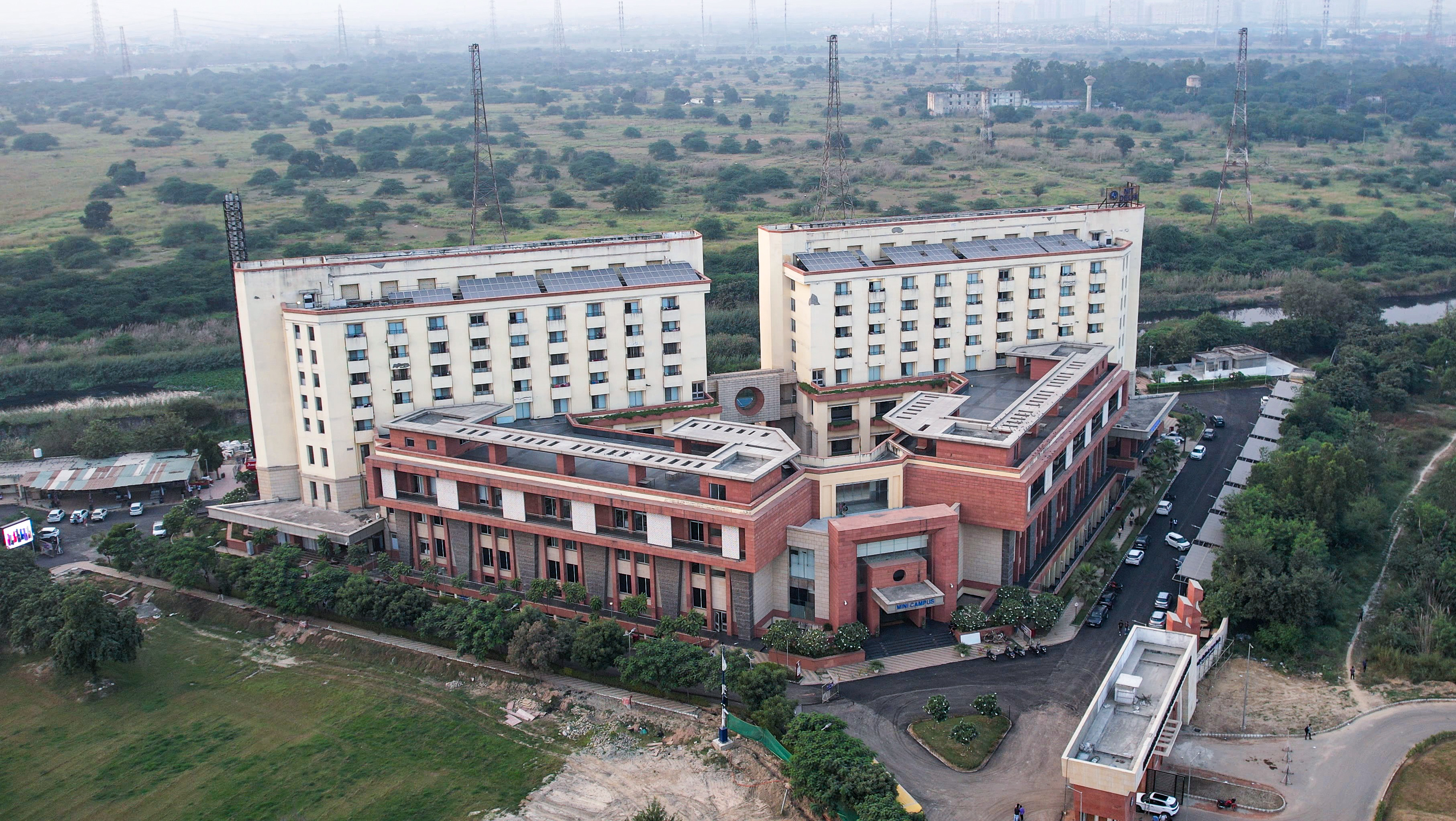
Mini Campus Aerial View

Campus development is being executed in stages. Phase-1A comprising a Mini-Campus, a dedicated Start-up Centre and the Administrative Block, has been completed and now houses classrooms, laboratories and incubation suites . Phase 1B is under way and will deliver a central academic building, an 800-seat hostel, staff quarters and the Director's residence, consolidating all departments and expanding residential capacity. Beyond the bricks and mortar, the campus already supports a fully automated RFID-enabled central library (relocated to the permanent site in 2022), a high-bandwidth computer centre, Wi-Fi-enabled hostels, health and guest-house facilities, and extensive sports infrastructure for cricket, football, basketball, volleyball, badminton and indoor games. Regular technical, cultural and sports festivals, such as the annual sports meet ZEAL, add vibrancy to student life and complement the institute's growing research and innovation ecosystem.

=== Transit campus ===
NIT Delhi previously conducted its activities at NILERD Campus in Narela. It has now shifted to a permanent campus.

=== Library ===
The Central Library at NIT Delhi was founded in June 2012 in Dwarka and relocated to the IAMR Campus in the Narela Institutional Area in February 2014. The Central Library, located on the 3rd floor of the Administrative Block of the Institute, acts as the primary information resource centre and the repository of various printed as well as electronic resources that support teaching, research, and all the academic activities of the Institute. All the students, faculty members, and staff of the Institute are entitled to access all the library facilities and services. The Library has a rich collection of books on Science and Technology, including Chemistry, Mathematics, Physics, Chemical Engineering. Civil Engineering, Computer Science, Electrical and Electronics Engineering. Humanities, Management, and Social Sciences. Besides this, the library also has a good collection of Rajbhasha Hindi Books, Dictionaries, Handbooks, Encyclopedias, and research-related books.

Information Technology- Automated Library System

- The library is connected to the campus LAN and Wi-Fi facility.
- The library has an RFID (Radio Frequency Identification) based Automation system and a Circulation system (self check-in/Check-out).
- The library has a WebOPAC facility under which all the bibliographic details of the library collection can be accessed from the Internet 24/7 on all weekdays by the users.
- The EAS/RFID Security Gates are installed at the library entrance to prevent Library resources from theft activities.
- The RFID smart cards (i.e. Institute ID cum Library Card) along with a cardholder and lanyard are provided to all the students & faculty/staff members of the Institute.
- The library has an RFID Portable Handheld reader for easy and quick physical verification of Library Books, for locating missing books, and security checks of checked-out items, etc.
- The library has initiated a QR code facility for Overdue payments in the Library to provide convenience to patrons, and it streamlines the payment process.

=== Computer Center ===
The Computer Centre, NITD, was established on 18/02/2014 to cater for the computational requirements of the Institute and is equipped with the latest state-of-the-art Technological Resources. The Institute visualises a centralized computing facility, campus-wide networking and information technology as a means to enrich the educational experience and invigorate emerging areas of scholarly research and development. The Computer Centre maintains and manages the Wi-Fi facility, Blade Servers and Hardware and Software on campus, which have a Single Mode Fiber backbone and managed by L3 and L2 Switches/Wireless Controller (WLC), providing 2 Gbps Uplink (1:1), Primary bandwidth from Reliance Communication and also PRI Line, 1 Gbps (Shared) Uplink from NKN and P2P 500 Mbps from main Campus to SRHCH. These networking facilities are also extended to Admin Building, Academic Building, Hostels and Residential areas.

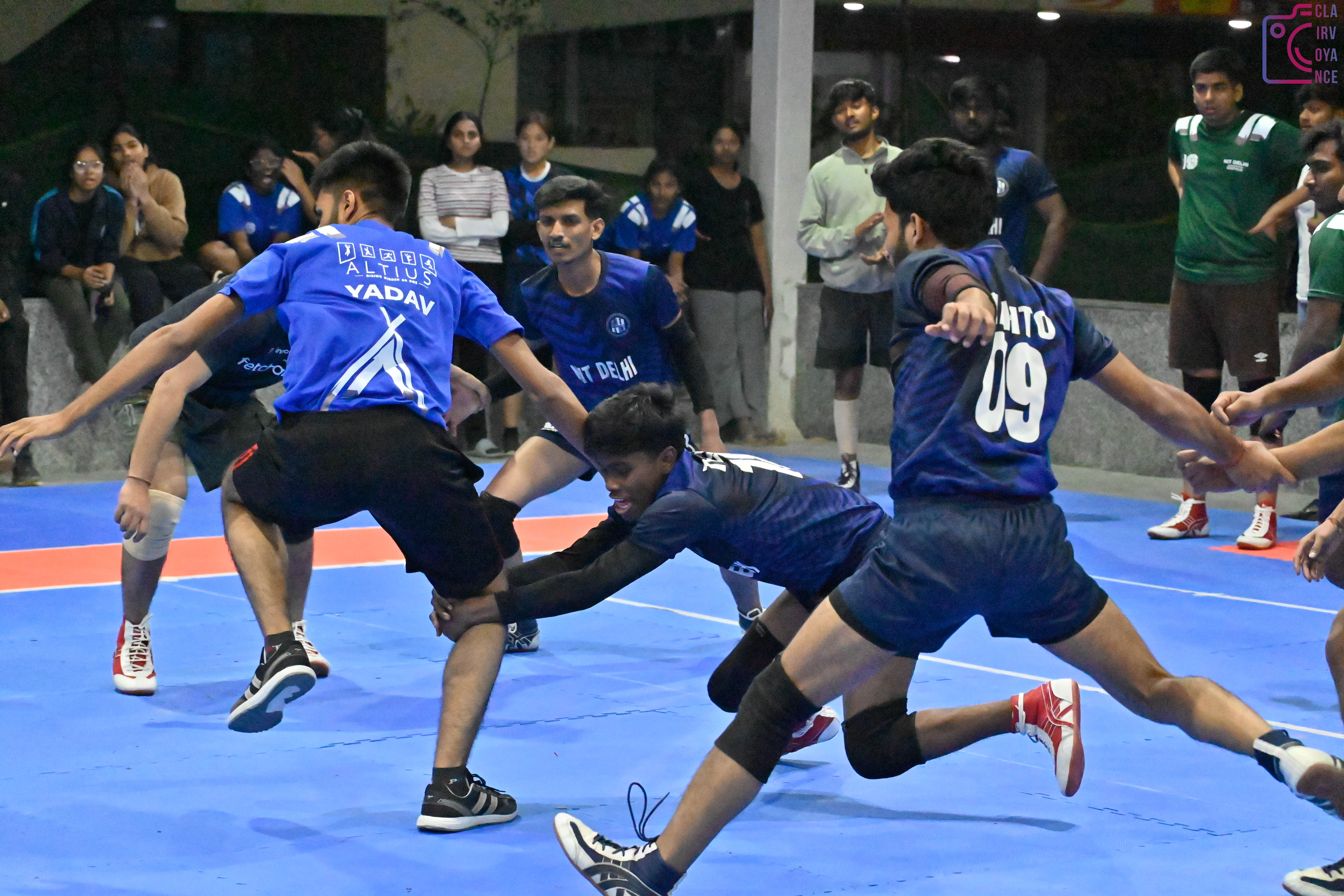
Sports at NIT Delhi

=== Sports facilities ===
The institute has a sports department for several indoor and outdoor games. Indoor games include badminton, table tennis, carrom, and chess. Outdoor games include cricket, 400m athletics track, football, kabaddi, lawn tennis and basketball. There are football and volleyball courts, as well as a cricket pitch, kabaddi courts, a lawn tennis court, and basketball courts. Altius, the sports club, organises an annual sports festival in February or March every year named ZEAL.

=== Health Center ===
The medical needs of the Campus population consisting of students, staff members and their families are met by the Institute Health Center. The Health Center has medical officer, nursing staff members and office attendant. It has facilities for OPD treatment and day care management. Health Center has Doctor's room, Pharmacy, nursing station, observation room containing semi-fowler beds for patient care and visiting specialist's room where services of Gynaecologist and Physiotherapist may be availed. There is a facility of ambulance 24X7 available for students, faculty and staff. The Ambulance is fully equipped with an oxygen cylinder, first aid kit bag, emergency medicines and other necessary equipment.

== Organisation and administration ==
=== Governance ===
The rules, regulations, and recommendations for the functioning of all NITs in India are decided by the NIT Council. The council members are representatives of all NITs and the MHRD. The institute is governed by a Board of Governors, and the director of the institute is an ex officio member of the board.

=== Departments ===
Currently, the following six departments are functioning in the institute:

- Applied Sciences, Humanities & Management
- Computer Science & Engineering
- Electronics and Communication Engineering
- Electrical Engineering
- Mechanical and Aerospace Engineering
- Civil Engineering

== Academics ==
=== Academic programmes ===
NIT Delhi offers only engineering programmes at the graduate, undergraduate, and doctoral levels, offering four-year bachelor's degree programmes in Computer Science and Engineering, Electronics and Communication Engineering,Electrical and Electronics Engineering, Mechanical Engineering, Civil Engineering, and Artificial Intelligence & Data Science Engineering, which was introduced in 2023.

The intake of students for the Bachelor of Technology courses is 60 in each branch, offering two-year master's degree programmes in Electronics and Communication Engineering and Computer Science and Engineering (Analytics). The intake of students to these postgraduate programmes is 15 students each. Furthermore, it offers Doctor of Philosophy (PhD) degree programmes in Electrical and electronics engineering, electronics and communication engineering and computer science.

=== Admissions ===
Undergraduate admission to the institute is through the Joint Entrance Examination (Main) organised by the Ministry of Education's National Testing Agency. Additionally, the seats are allotted by the Joint Seat Allocation Authority, with half of the seats being reserved under the Home State category for students from Delhi and Chandigarh. The remaining half of the seats are filled by students from other states.

Admission of foreign nationals is managed by the Direct Admission of Students Abroad (DASA) programme, administered by India's Ministry of Education (MoE). The number of seats available for foreign nationals in each branch at NIT Delhi is 4, and these are over and above the intake of each branch.

Admissions to the Master of Technology programmes are based on candidates' performance in the Graduate Aptitude Test in Engineering (GATE).

== Ranking ==
In 2025, NIT Delhi was ranked by the National Institutional Ranking Framework (NIRF) as being the 65th best out of 100 other participant universities in terms of engineering.

University rankings

Engineering – India
- NIRF (2023): 51
- NIRF (2024): 45

== Research ==
The institute research focus, includes very-large-scale integration and embedded systems, power electronics and drives, magnetohydrodynamics, and mathematical modelling of fluid dynamics.

== Student life ==
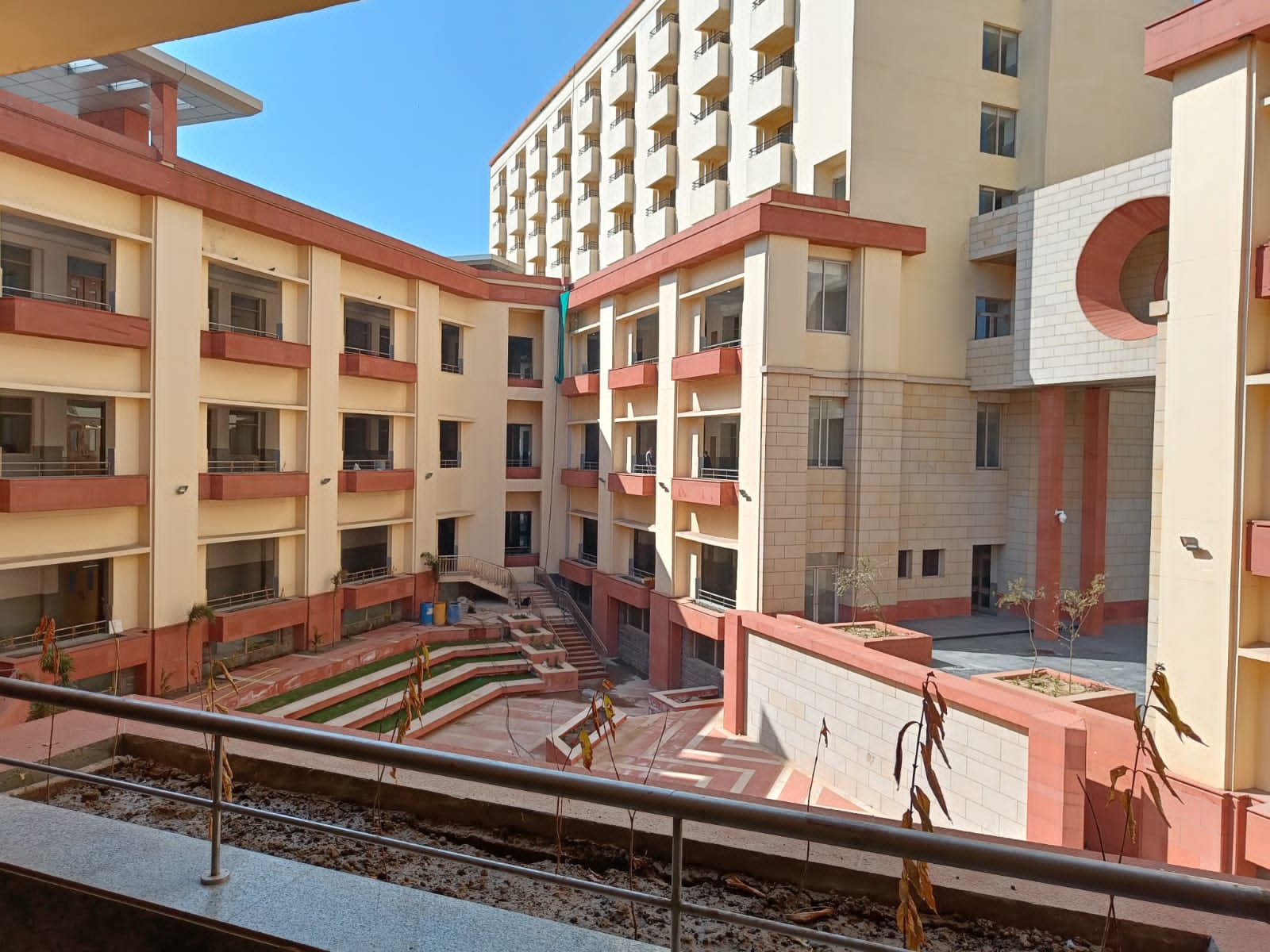
NIT Delhi Open Air Theatre

NIT Delhi has various clubs and student organisations, with the Dean of Student Welfare being at the helm of all these programmes. Additionally, the institution hosts different clubs, including the Cultural Club, Fashion Society Rivaaz, Technical Club UPVISION, AlphaZ, Literature Society, Alt - The Sports Club, Clairvoyance - The Photography Club, Arts Club, Social Reformation Cell (SRC), and the Google Developers Student Club (GDSC).

NIT Delhi hosts two major annual events:

- Sentience: A Techno-Cultural Festival, which is the union of two major and average milestones, TerraTechnica and Saptrang.
- Zeal: A Sports festival
