= Santosh Mehrotra =

Indian economist

Santosh K. Mehrotra
- Born: 30 July 1955; Lucknow, UP, India)

Academic background
- Education: Cambridge University; The New School (New York City); Jawaharlal Nehru University; Allahabad University; La Martiniere College

Academic work
- Discipline: Human development, economist
- Institutions: Jawaharlal Nehru University, Delhi, India
- Notable ideas: human development economist
- Website: https://santoshmehrotraeco0.wixsite.com/my-site-1/bio

Santosh Mehrotra (Lucknow, U.P. India, 30 July 1955) is a development economist, whose research and writings have had most influence in the areas of labour, employment, skill development, on the relationship between human development and economic growth, child poverty, and the economics of education. He was an economic adviser in the United Nations system in New York City, Italy, and Thailand (1991–2006), and technocrat in the government of India (2006–2014), apart from making contributions to academic research since the mid-1980s. He has also in recent years established a reputation as an institution-builder in the field of research in India, despite facing difficult odds. He brings a combination of professional experience: with the Indian government as a policy maker and adviser, with international organisations as a technical expert, having lived on three continents and travelled to 63 countries providing technical advice to governments; and as an academic whose research work has been translated into French, Spanish, Portuguese, Italian and German.

He is married to Sushma Kapoor, who was the Deputy Regional Director, UNWOMEN, South Asia, and has a daughter, Pia Sukanya, who is a singer, music-maker, actress and film director.

== Early life and education ==
Mehrotra was the son of an officer of the Indian Administrative Service. He had most of his early education in schools in Lucknow, including the historic La Martiniere College. He finished his schooling in Allahabad, the university town. His mother, herself a poet in Hindi, from Allahabad, had grown up surrounded by stories of the nationalist movement against the British, and both parents imbued him with a deep sense of nationalism. She was the daughter of a distinguished lawyer, who was Mayor of Allahabad. Her father, KP Kakkar had defeated Motilal Nehru, the father of India's first Prime Minister, Jawaharlal Nehru, in the city elections to the Mayor-ship in 1922.

After Mehrotra graduated from Allahabad University, his father expected him to join the Indian Administrative Service. However, he wanted to become an academic and won two fellowships to study abroad, first to obtain a master's degree in Economics at The New School for Social Research, New York city. Here he was taught by well-known economists, like Edward J. Nell, Robert Heilbroner, Ross Thomson, and Gita Sen. Mehrotra then moved to Cambridge University to do a PhD in Economics.

== Professional life ==
Finishing the PhD in 1985 he returned to India to a life in academia. In 1988 he became associate professor, School of International Studies, Jawaharlal Nehru University, New Delhi.

In 1991, Mehrotra was called away to the United Nations system in New York. From 1991 to 2006, he spent 15 years with two UN agencies – UNICEF and UNDP. In the latter, he was the chief economist of the global Human Development Report (2002–05), New York. Before that he led the research programme on developing countries at UNICEF's global research institute, the Innocenti Research Center, Florence, Italy (1999–2002).

After an international career, he left the UN to return to India in September 2006 to head the Rural Development Division of Planning Commission (India), where he was also the Economic Adviser for the Social Sectors. He then headed Development Policy Division, Planning Commission (till August 2009).

He was Director-General, National Institute of Labour Economics Research (earlier called Institute of Applied Manpower Research), Planning Commission (in the rank of Secretary, Government of India) until August 2014.

He also held a three-year appointment as Parkin Visiting Professor at the Centre for International Development in the Faculty of Social Sciences, at the University of Bath, UK (2010–13).

Mehrotra was till mid 2020 Professor of Economics, Centre for Informal Sector and Labour Studies, Jawaharlal Nehru University,

Santosh Mehrotra is currently visiting professor, at the Centre for Development studies, University of Bath, UK.

== Contributions ==
He was a lead author of several chapters in India's 11th Five Year Plan (Five-Year Plans of India) (2007–2012). For the 11th Plan, he led the team that authored several chapters related to watershed development; land reforms; and food security and nutrition. Later, for the 12th Five Year Plan (2012–17) he led the team that wrote the chapters on Employment and on Skill Development. He was also the Team Leader of the second-ever national Human Development Report of India.

In early 2011 he led the drafting of a National Vocational Education Qualification Framework for India, which is the basis of skill development now being implemented by the Government of India generally, and especially the Ministry of Human Resource Development. The NVEQF (now called the National Skills Qualification Framework) is the basis of vocational education being introduced in class 9 in India, enabling 15-year-old children in schools in India to access vocational education. This was a change for India's school children, as millions of them drop out after completing 8 years of compulsory schooling. Currently he is a member of the National Steering Committee of National Skills Qualification Framework, MHRD

As Member-Secretary of the Expert Group on 'Development Challenges in Extremist-Affected Areas', he steered a landmark report to the Planning Commission, which became the basis of several policy initiatives by the Planning Commission for rural areas that are Maoist-affected districts.

He was a member of the NC Saxena Committee on 'Criteria to Identify the Poor', and a member of its Drafting Committee. He co-authored the research paper that became the basis of the methodology now adopted by the government of India in the Socio-Economic Census over 2011–2013 to identify the poor conducted.

He was also a member of the Expert Group of government of India to revamp the self-help groups based programme, SGSY (Swarnajayanti Gram Swarozgar Yojana), and convert it into the National Rural Livelihood Mission. NRLM has been taken to scale all over India, as a much improved programme to promote women's self-help groups.

He was a member of the inter-ministerial Expert Group that designed the first major Conditional Cash Transfer for the Govt of India (Ministry of Women and Child Development), giving cash transfers to pregnant and lactating mothers, 2009.

He was the only Indian economist on the international review panel of the International Initiative for Impact Evaluation 2009–10. He was a member of the World Bank's High Level Advisory Panel, Washington, DC, in 2011 to advise IDA/World Bank on criteria for selecting projects for conducting Impact Evaluations. For the World Bank he was invited by its Independent Evaluation Group prepare a paper on the state of evaluation in India.

Mehrotra writes regularly for a number of English and Hindi language newspapers on these issues. He also appears regularly on Indian and international TV channels as a poverty specialist and human development economist.

== Controversies ==
When in 2013 the data suggested that despite the fastest economic growth in the history of independent India, the growth was 'jobless', with manufacturing employment actually falling in absolute terms, he had no hesitation in so averring, despite heading a Planning Commission-funded research institute. Mehrotra was repeatedly interviewed by TV channels, and demonstrated that there had been jobless growth.

Mehrotra has also shown through his research that the government commitment to skilling 500 million people between 2012 and 2022 is based on an incorrect estimate, and the government's instruction to its ministries to plan skill development capacity accordingly risks wasting resources. He showed that the numbers to be skilled over 10 years was only about 200 million, a daunting enough task.

== Awards and fellowships ==
- Member, International Scientific Committee, Council on Research on Poverty (CROP), International Social Science Research Council, Paris, 2004–10.
- Fellow, Council for Research on Poverty (CROP), Norway, 2011 to present.
- Parkin Visiting Professor, Centre for Development Studies, University of Bath 2010–13
- Visiting Fellow, Centre for Development Studies, University of Bath.
- Rockefeller Foundation, Bellagio Centre, Italy: Author Fellowship, June 2013
- Visiting Research Professor, University of Bergen, Norway (2014–15)
- Professorial fellow, Nehru Memorial Museum and library, New Delhi;
- Research fellow, IZA institute of labour economics, Bonn, Germany;

== National advisory boards ==
He has been on a large number of advisory boards in India since 2006:

- Member, National Steering Committee for the National Skils Qualification Framework, Ministry of HRD, Government of India
- Member of six working groups or steering committees for 12th Five Year Plan, Planning Commission: two in education (one for elem edu, one for higher edu); one in rural development; two in labour and employment; one in industry, 2011–12
- Member, National Governing Council, National Rural Employment Guarantee Programme, Ministry of Rural Development, 2006–2008
- Member, ExpertGroup of Feminist Economists (created to make recommendations on the 11th and 12th Five Year Plan)

== International advisory boards ==
- Member, International Advisory Board, Chronic Poverty Research Centre, UK, since 2008
- Member, Editorial Board, Compare, a journal of International Comparative Education (UK), 2005–11
- Member, Editorial advisory board of Journal of Global Social Policy (Sage), Sheffield University and Globalism and Social Policy Programme, Helsinki, 2002–11
- Member, International Advisory Board, Younglives Research Project, Queen Elizabeth House, Oxford University, UK (in India, Vietnam, Ethiopia, Peru), 2001–2012
- International Expert Advisory panel of UNDP's global Human Development Report, New York (Consumption for Human Development 1997; Human Development to Eradicate Poverty 1998)
- Member, International Advisory Board, Research programme on macro-economic policy analysis for growth and employment (PEP), IDRC (International Development Research Centre), Canada
- Chair, global Expert Group on Technical and Vocational Education and Training, UNESCO, Paris, 2014–15

== Books and publications ==
He has written or edited eleven books, which are taught in universities around the world:

- Social and Economic Policies to Reduce Poverty in Latin America: Is there something that can be learned from the experience in Asia, (National University of Maxico, 2021)
- Reviving Jobs: an Agenda for Growth,penguinrandomhouse, 2020
- Planning in the 20th Century and Beyond: India's Planning Commission and NITI Aayog, Cambridge University Press.
- Seizing the Demographic Dividend. Policies to Achieve Inclusive Growth in India (Cambridge University Press 2015);
- Countering Naxalism with Development: The Challenge of State Security with Social Justice (Sage 2014).
- Land Policies for Growth with Equity:Transforming the Agrarian Structure in Uttar Pradesh (Sage 2014);
- India's Skills Challenge: Reforming Vocational Education and Training to Harness the Demographic Dividend, ed. (Oxford University Press 2014)
- Eliminating Human Poverty: Macro-economic and Social Policies for Equitable Growth (Zed, London, 2007).
- Asian Informal Workers. Global Risks, Local Protection (Routledge, London, 2007),
- The Economics of Elementary Education in India, SAGE Publications, 2006;
- Universalizing Elementary Education in India. Unchanging the Tiger Economy (Oxford, 2005);
- Le Developpement a Visage Humain, Economica, Paris, 2001;
- Development with a Human Face. Experiences in Social Achievement and Economic Growth (Clarendon Press, 1997 and Oxford, 2000);
- India and the Soviet Union: Trade and Technology Transfer, Cambridge University Press, 1990)

== Research articles ==
- "Explaining Employment Trends in India, 1993/4 to 2011/12, Economic and Political Weekly, vol 49, no. 32.
- "International Experience with National Training Funds: Lessons for India", Economic and Political Weekly, vol 49, no 26-7.
- Mehrotra, Santosh; Gandhi, Ankita; Sahoo, Bimal K (2013). "Estimating India's Skill Gap: on a Realistic Basis for 2022". Economic and Political Weekly. 48 (13): 102–111. JSTOR 23391471.
- Mehrotra, Santosh; Gandhi, Ankita; Saha, Partha; Sahoo, Bimal Kishore (December 2012). "Joblessness and Informalization: Challenges to Inclusive Growth in India" (PDF). Institute of Applied Manpower Research. Archived from the original (PDF) on 13 October 2017.
- "A Proposed National Qualifications Framework for Vocational Education for India", IAMR Occasional Paper no 4, 2012.
- Mehrotra, Santosh (22 October 2010). "India and the global economic crisis". Journal of Asian Public Policy. 3 (2): 122–134. doi:10.1080/17516234.2010.504326. S2CID 153663875.
- Mehrotra, Santosh (1 January 2013). "Monitoring, evaluation and performance management in South Asia: The challenge of building capacity". Evaluation. 19 (1): 74–84. doi:10.1177/1356389012471257. S2CID 143775418.
- Mehrotra, Santosh (January 2012). "The cost and financing of the right to education in India: Can we fill the financing gap?". International Journal of Educational Development. 32 (1): 65–71. doi:10.1016/j.ijedudev.2011.02.001.
- Mehrotra, Santosh; Kapoor, Sushma (28 October 2009). "Capability deprivation of women: are women holding up half the sky in Asia?". Journal of Asian Public Policy. 2 (3): 243–265. doi:10.1080/17516230903204729. S2CID 153645420.
- "The 'reformed' Planning Commission: The Way Forward, Economic and Political Weekly, 2014, vol 49, no 37.
- Mehrotra, Santosh (May 2006). "Reforming elementary education in India: A menu of options". International Journal of Educational Development. 26 (3): 261–277. doi:10.1016/j.ijedudev.2005.08.001.
- Social Protection in the Informal Economy: Home-based Women Workers and Outsourced Manufacturing in South Asian, World Development (Boston United States), Oct 2005, vol 33, no 10, 1735–1757, ISSN 0305-750X
- Mehrotra, Santosh (1 September 1998). "Education for All: Policy Lessons from High-Achieving Countries". International Review of Education. 44 (5): 461–484. Bibcode:1998IREdu..44..461M. doi:10.1023/A:1003433029696. JSTOR 3444849. S2CID 142665983.
- Finance for Development, Journal of Global Social Policy (based UK), April 2002, ISSN 1468-0181.
- Mehrotra, Santosh (1 September 1998). "Improving cost-effectiveness and mobilizing resources for primary education in Sub-Saharan Africa". Prospects. 28 (3): 469–489. doi:10.1007/BF02736819. S2CID 144201854.

Many other research articles can be found on this web page.
