= Paul Courant =

American economist

Paul N. Courant
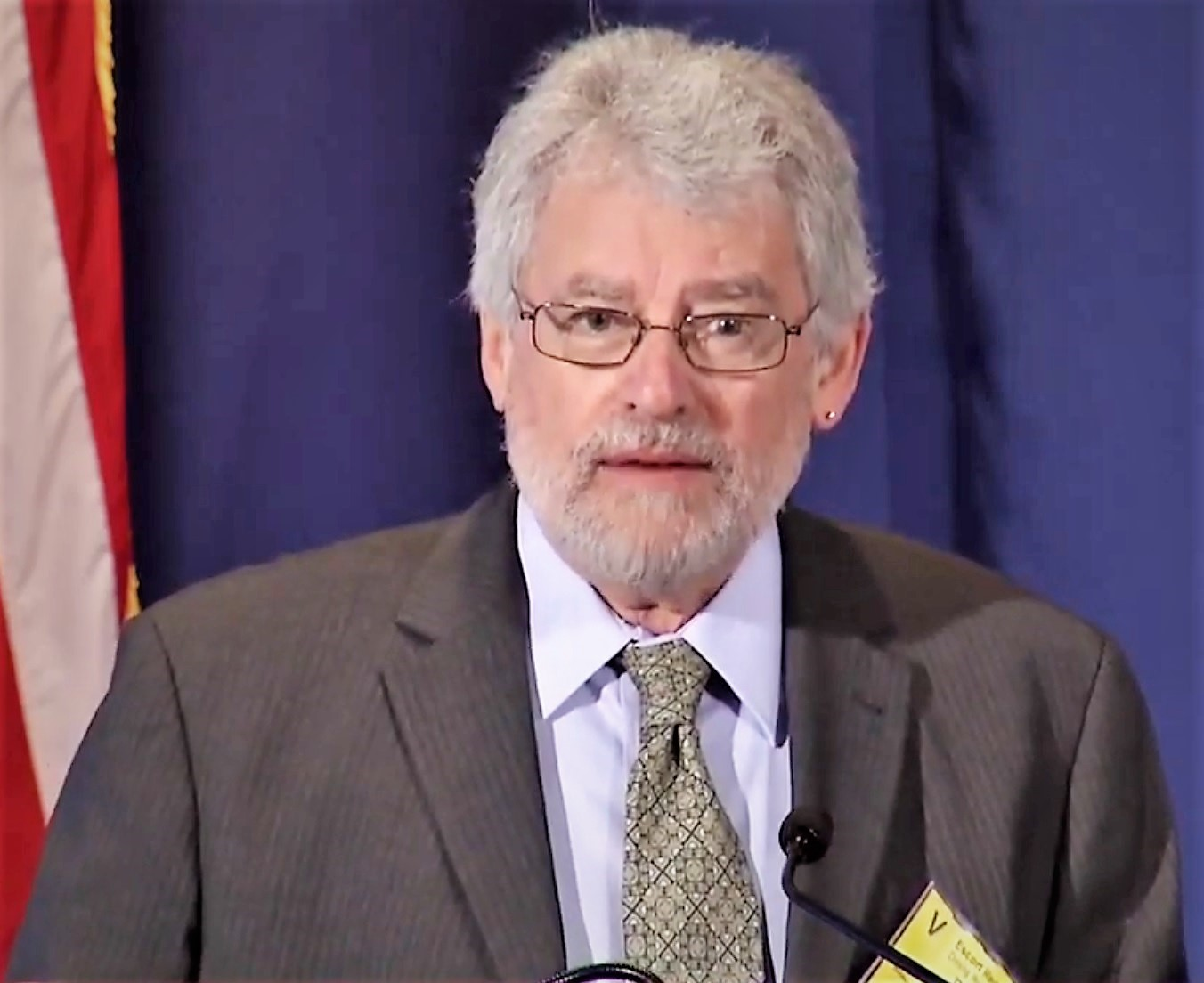
- Courant speaks at the Gerald R. Ford School of Public Policy in 2014
- Born: January 5, 1948 (age 78)

Academic background
- Education: Princeton University; Swarthmore College
- Doctoral advisor: Edwin Mills

Paul N. Courant (born January 5, 1948) is an American economist who is an expert in public goods. His recent research focuses on the economics of universities, the economics of libraries and archives, and the impact of new information technologies on the scholarly publishing system.

== Education ==
Courant received his BA in history from Swarthmore College in 1968; an MA in economics from Princeton University in 1973; and a PhD in economics from Princeton University in 1974.

== Career ==
Before attending graduate school, Courant served as a research assistant at the Brookings Institution. After receiving his PhD, he joined the faculty at the University of Michigan, where he has remained. In 1979 and 1980 he was a Senior Staff Economist at the Council of Economic Advisers. From 2002 to 2005 he served as Provost and Executive Vice-president for Academic Affairs, the chief academic officer and the chief budget officer of the university. While Provost, he negotiated a contract with Google to allow them to digitize the entire contents of Michigan's library for their Google Books Library Project now known as Google Books. He has also served as the Associate Provost for Academic and Budgetary Affairs, Chair of the Department of Economics and Director of the Institute of Public Policy Studies (which is now the Gerald R. Ford School of Public Policy). He served as the University Librarian and Dean of Libraries from 2007 to 2013.

Courant is Arthur F. Thurnau Professor, Harold T. Shapiro Collegiate Professor of Public Policy, Professor of Economics, Professor of Information, and Faculty Associate in the Institute for Social Research at the University of Michigan.

Courant has authored half a dozen books and over seventy papers covering a broad range of topics in economics and public policy, including tax policy, local economic development, gender differences in pay, housing, radon and public health, relationships between economic growth and environmental policy, and university budgeting systems.

== Boards ==
- ARTstor Board of Trustees
- Center for Research Libraries Board of Directors
- Council on Library and Information Resources Board of Directors
- Digital Public Library of America (DPLA) Board of Directors

== Comments on the Google Library Project ==
In November 2007, Courant started a blog in which he defended the University of Michigan's participation in the Google Books Library Project. His remarks joined an ongoing debate about the project, specifically with regard to the role of libraries in large scale digitization efforts.

== Selected bibliography ==
Book chapters

- Courant, Paul N.; Corcoran, Mary E. (1995), "Sex-role socialization and occupational segregation: an exploratory investigation", in Humphries, Jane (ed.), Gender and economics, Aldershot, England Brookfield, Vermont, USA: Edward Elgar, pp. 495–511, ISBN 9781852788438.

Journal articles

- Courant, Paul N.; Corcoran, Mary E. (March 1987). "Sex-role socialization and occupational segregation: an exploratory investigation". Journal of Post Keynesian Economics. 9 (3): 330–346. CiteSeerX 10.1.1.431.6259. doi:10.1080/01603477.1987.11489627.
