= Edwin Mills (economist) =

American economist (born 1928)

Edwin S. Mills
- Born: June 25, 1928; Collingswood, New Jersey
- Died: October 29, 2021 (aged 93); Chicago, Illinois

Academic background
- Education: University of Birmingham; Brown University
- Doctoral advisor: Frank Hahn; W. M. Gorman

Academic work
- Discipline: Urban economics
- Institutions: Johns Hopkins University, Princeton University, Northwestern University
- Doctoral students: Ryuzo Sato; Robert Higgs; Herschel Grossman; Paul Courant [Rakesh Mohan]

Edwin Smith Mills III (June 25, 1928 – October 29, 2021) was an American economist known for his contributions to urban economics. Mills was a long-time faculty member at Johns Hopkins University (1957–1970), Princeton University (1970–1987), and Northwestern University (1987–1996). He was the founding editor of the Journal of Urban Economics. He was also the Editor of the Studies in Urban Economics, Academic Press, 1977-1985; Member, Editorial Board, Journal of the American Real Estate and Urban Economics Association, 1987-1996; Member, Editorial Board, Journal of Real Estate Finance and Economics, 1987-1990 Co-editor, 1991-1996; Member, Editorial Board, Review of Urban and Regional Development Studies, 1987- 1996. Member, Board of Editors, Center for Urban Policy Research, Rutgers University, 1990- 1996. Member, Editorial Board, Journal of Housing Economics, 1990-1996, Member, Illinois Real Estate Journal Editorial Advisory Board, 1999-2001.

A native of Collingswood, New Jersey, Mills graduated from Collingswood High School in 1946 and then served for two years as an officer with the United States Army Corps of Engineers.

He received an A.B. in Economics from Brown University in 1951 and a PhD in Economics from the University of Birmingham in 1956. His contribution in the field of urban economics is enormously rich. The concept of agglomeration economies, particularly the urbanisation economies, and its manifestation in terms of firm level technical efficiency and productivity growth are some of the pioneering elements of his research. He edited the second volume (titled Urban Economics, 1987) and co-edited with Paul Cheshire the third volume (titled Applied Urban Economics, 1999) of the Handbook of Regional and Urban Economics. His special interest in Indian urbanization is reflected in his co-authored work with Charles M. Becker (Studies in Indian urban development, Oxford University Press, Oxford, for the World Bank, 1986), with Charles M. Becker and Jeffrey G. Williamson (Indian Urbanization and Economic Growth since 1960, The Johns Hopkins University Press, 1992) and with Arup Mitra (Urban Development and Urban Ills, Commonwealth Publishers, 1997). He contributed to policy making and advised the policy makers in several countries in the world. He was the Principal Resource Person of the collaborative study of urban poverty in seven southeast Asian countries, Asian Development Bank, 1992-1993.

He served a large number of committees related to city development, waste management, communication network, transport, vehicle and air quality, energy issues, rural studies, population growth and land use change, etc. He was a visiting scholar/professor at a large number of universities and other organisations including the World Bank and the Urban Land Institute.

The Regional Science Association International Conference (Chicago, November 1992) dedicated three sessions in his honor. He was also honored for 20 years of service by the Economics Institute, August 1995. A conference was organised in his honor at Allen Center, Kellogg School of Management, April 11, 12, 1992, on his retirement as Editor, Journal of Urban Economics (papers published in the Journal of Urban Economics, Vol. 34, No. 2, September 1993). He was named “Real Estate Person of the Year,” by Chicago Real Estate Securities and Syndication Institute, 1989. He was the recipient of Life Achievement Award conferred by Real Estate Investment Association, October 1995 and was made a life member of the Association. He also received the George Bloom Award for 1996 by American Real Estate and Urban Economics Association, January 1997.
