= Encyclopedia of Life Support Systems =

The Encyclopedia of Life Support Systems (EOLSS) is an integrated compendium of twenty one encyclopedias.

The EOLSS is one of the largest database repositories on the web, dedicated to the health, maintenance and future of the web of life on planet Earth, focusing on the connections among all the myriad aspects from natural and social sciences through water, energy, land, food, agriculture, environment, biodiversity, health, education, culture, engineering and technology, management, development and environmental security. It has been developed under the auspices of the United Nations Educational, Scientific and Cultural Organization (UNESCO).

The EOLSS body of knowledge is a virtual compendium of twenty-one component encyclopedias (Subject Categories). It is regarded as the world’s largest comprehensive professional publication carrying peer-reviewed, thematically organized archival content in many traditional disciplines and interdisciplinary subjects including the coverage of transdisciplinary pathways. The contributions are from thousands of scholars from over 100 countries and edited by more than 395 subject experts. It also includes up-to-date coverage of various aspects of sustainable development that are relevant to the current state of the world. The objectives are Education for Sustainable Development and Promotion of Life Support Systems Culture of Peace and Social Justice.

It can be regarded as an 'encyclopedia of encyclopedias', presenting a wide range of major foundation subjects in a process of gradual development, from a broad overview to great detail under the following categories:

- - Earth and Atmospheric Sciences
- - Mathematical Sciences
- - Biological, Physiological and Health Sciences
- - Biotechnology
- - Tropical Biology and Conservation Management
- - Social Sciences and Humanities
- - Physical Sciences, Engineering and Technology Resources
- - Control Systems, Robotics and Automation
- - Chemical Sciences Engineering and Technology Resources
- - Water sciences, Engineering and Technology Resources
- - Desalination and Water Resources (DESWARE)
- - Energy sciences and Engineering and Technology Resources
- - Environmental and Ecological sciences, Engineering and Technology Resources
- - Food and Agricultural Sciences, Engineering and Technology Resources
- - Human Resources Policy, Development and Management
- - Natural Resources Policy and Management
- - Development and Economic Sciences
- - Institutional and Infrastructural Resources
- - Technology, Information and System Management Resources
- - Land Use, Land Cover and Soil Sciences
- - Area Studies (Africa, Brazil, Canada And USA, China, Europe, Japan, Russia)

Within these twenty one on-line encyclopedias, there are hundreds of Themes, each of which has been compiled under the editorial supervision of a recognized world expert or a team of experts such as an International Commission specially appointed for the purpose. Each of these 'Honorary Theme Editors' was responsible for selection and appointment of authors to produce the material specified by EOLSS. On average each Theme contains about thirty chapters. It deals in detail with interdisciplinary subjects, but it is also disciplinary, as each major core subject is covered in great depth by world experts. The EOLSS is different from traditional encyclopedias. It is the result of an unprecedented global effort that has attempted to forge pathways between disciplines in order to address contemporary problems" said UNESCO Director General Koïchiro Matsuura. "A source-book of knowledge that links together our concern for peace, progress, and sustainable development, the EOLSS draws sustenance from the ethics, science and culture of peace. At the same time, it is a forward-looking publication, designed as a global guide to professional practice, education, and heightened social awareness of critical life support issues. In particular, the EOLSS presents perspectives from regions and cultures around the world, and seeks to avoid geographic, racial, cultural, political, gender, age, or religious bias."

It is a professional publication carrying thematically organized subject matter for an audience at the university level with contributions from thousands of experts from over 101 countries. It serves as a resource for education, research, and policy making.

== See also ==
- List of online encyclopedias
