= Arup Chattopadhyay =

Pt. Arup Chattopadhyay is one of the finest and most sought after tabla artists of this generation. He has established himself as a top-notch accompanist as well as a formidable soloist. Arup’s performances are admired for their exceptional tonal quality, clarity, and deep compositional repertoire, all presented with an innate sense of rhythm and melody.

Arup began learning tabla at the age of six from his father, the eminent tabla artist, Pt. Pankaj Chattopadhyay. He then came under the tutelage of the world-renowned tabla maestro Pt. Shankar Ghosh, and is one of his premier disciples. Arup was awarded Top-Grade by All India Radio and Television.

Arup has been honored to accompany the legendary Bharat Ratna Pt. Ravi Shankar in tours throughout the US, Canada, Europe and India, including performances in Carnegie Hall, Kennedy Center, and Lincoln Center in US, and Barbican Hall in London. Arup has accompanied many of the leading musicians such as Ustad Rais Khan, Ustad Ashish Khan, Pt. V.G. Jog, Ustad Shahid Parvez, Pt. Vishwa Mohan Bhatt, Ustad Shujaat Khan, Pt. Nayan Ghosh, Pt. Ajay Chakravarti, Vidushi Lakshmi Shankar, Pt. Rajan and Sajan Mushra, Pt. Manas Chakrabarty, Pt. Samaresh Chowdhury, Ustad Rashid Khan, Pt. Tarun Bhattacharya, Pt. Tejendra Narayan Majumdar, and Pt. Kushal Das. Arup toured the UK with the Late Pt. Deepak Choudhury several times since 1998, and toured the USA, Canada, Mexico, and Australia with Pt. Kartik Seshadri since 1997.

Arup is also a highly sought after teacher. Over the last eighteen years, he has been a visiting lecturer with University of California, San Diego. He was a Professor of Tabla at Bharatiya Vidya Bhavan (Institute of Indian Culture) in London.
