= Patriotism Curriculum =

A Patriotism Curriculum or Desh/Rashtra Bhakti Curriculum is an Indian educational program for children studying in nursery to grade twelve in schools run by the Government of Delhi since 28 September 2021.

== Thought exercises ==
Questions the students will face include:

- Do we still need patriotic soldiers on the border?
- Do we need Deshbhakti to maintain our independence?
- Who in your opinion engages in corruption?
- Do we need patriotic policemen, doctors, safai karamcharis, politicians?
- Why do we respect the parents of a soldier?

== See also ==
- Happiness Curriculum
