= Happiness Curriculum =

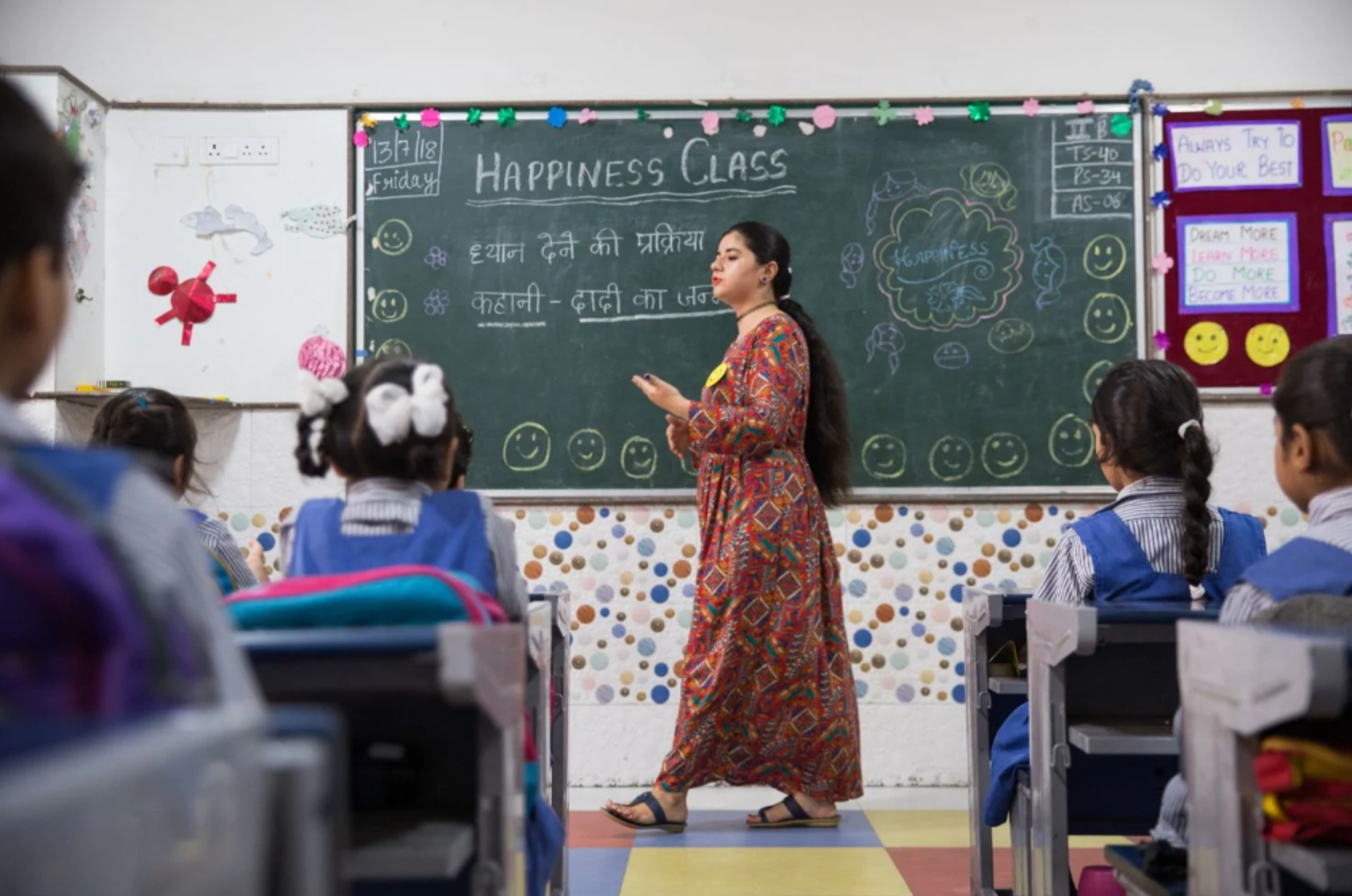
- Ongoing Happiness Class in a primary school in Delhi
- Type of project: Curriculum
- Location: Delhi
- Owner: Government of Delhi
- Country: India
- Established: 2 July 2018
- Status: Active

Happiness Curriculum is an educational program for children studying in nursery to grade eight in schools run by the Government of Delhi since July 2018. The objective is to improve the mental well-being of pupils, and it teaches mindfulness, social-emotional learning, critical thinking, problem solving, and relationship building. Its purpose is to build emotional awareness, to support decision making with that emotional awareness, to equip pupils with the necessary skills and environment to become purpose-driven, and explore a nuanced idea of happiness. The introduction of the curriculum into government schools of Delhi has been called a reformative step towards school education in India.

The idea for the curriculum was laid out by Deputy Chief Minister of Delhi Manish Sisodia, who is also the education minister of the state. It was developed with the help of government experts and the State Council of Educational Research and Training. The curriculum is mostly based on the "Happiness Triad" concept of philosopher Agrahar Nagraj Sharma.

Taking inspiration from the curriculum, Indian states Andhra Pradesh and Uttarakhand, and Afghanistan, Nepal, and the United Arab Emirates are preparing to implement similar programs. In response to the COVID-19 pandemic and a subsequent nationwide lockdown in India, the curriculum is being delivered to pupils and their parents via interactive voice response calls and live YouTube classes.

== Background and inception ==
The idea of introducing a curriculum that addresses challenges of modern society was developed by the Deputy Chief Minister of Delhi Manish Sisodia in 2017. This curriculum was later named the Happiness Curriculum. A team of 40 professionals includes teachers from Government of Delhi schools, psychologists, education consultants, volunteers and the State Council of Educational Research and Training. This team also included senior officials from the Directorate of Education, Government of Delhi and people from various NGOs.

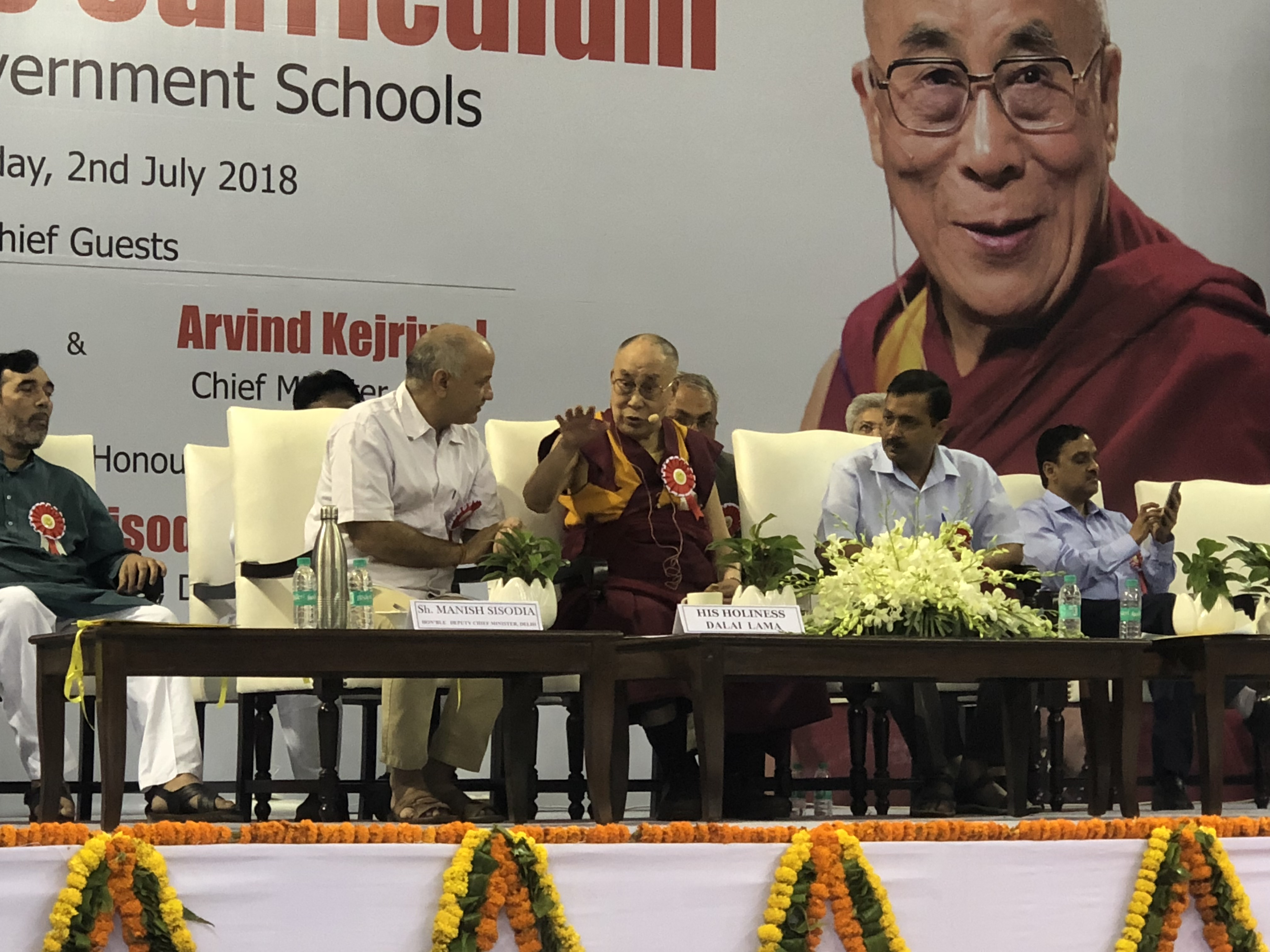
The launching ceremony of the curriculum.

The curriculum was launched on 2 July 2018. The launch ceremony was attended by the 14th Dalai Lama, and the Chief Minister of Delhi Arvind Kejriwal. School officials and teachers from more than 1,000 public schools across Delhi were present at the launch.

Dream a Dream a non-governmental organization anchored the curriculum in collaboration with other NGOs like Abhibhavak Vidyalaya, Circle of Life, Blue Orb Foundation and Labhya Foundation. As an anchor, Dream a Dream, supported in content development of the curriculum, engaged and provided capacity building sessions for Mentor Teachers and helped in developing an assessment tool to measure the implementation and impact of the curriculum on students and teachers.

== Framework ==
The curriculum is based on philosophies of thinkers and educationists such as Mahatma Gandhi, Rabindranath Tagore and Jiddu Krishnamurthy. It is primarily based on the concept of the "Happiness Triad" proposed by philosopher Agrahar Nagraj Sharma, according to which there are three components of happiness – momentary happiness, long term happiness and sustainable happiness. It is also based on Nagraj's concept of "coexistential thought" (Madhyasth Darshan), which is about simplicity, generosity, kindness and benevolence in the pursuit of happiness. The curriculum also includes concepts about self and relationships with family, society and nature.

The curriculum is laid out according to the guidelines of the National Curriculum Framework 2005. It is a grade-specific curriculum for all pupils from nursery to grade eight in schools run by the Government of Delhi.

=== Guiding questions ===
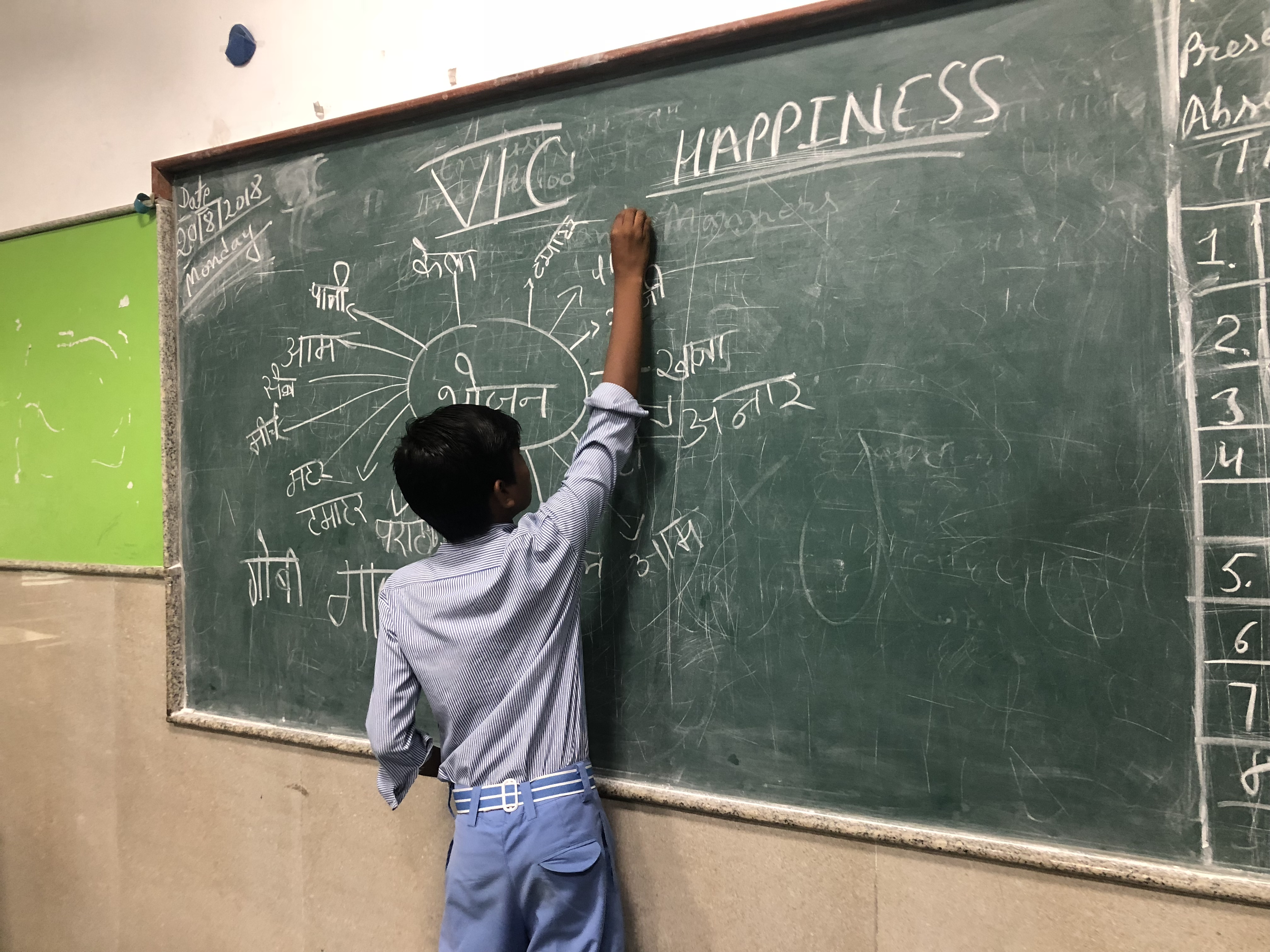
A student defining "Happiness" during a Happiness Class

The curriculum employs techniques such as mindfulness, reflective stories, interactive activities, and expression to equip pupils with the necessary skills and mindsets to answer the following questions: What makes me happy? How can I be an instrument in other people's happiness? Teachers use a manual to help pupils explore these questions, whose aim is to enable them to understand the relationship between their thoughts, emotions and themselves, their families, their environment and the society at large. The learning outcomes of the curriculum are awareness and focus, critical thinking and reflection, social-emotional skills, and a confident and pleasant personality

== Syllabus and classroom approach ==
Framework document of Happiness Curriculum, published by the State Council of Educational Research and Training, Delhi

The Government of Delhi has established a committee with 200 mentors to manage the curriculum's classes in its schools. The curriculum for all the grades is activity-based with no formal examination or textual reading material. No grades are given; assessments are predominantly qualitative.

The curriculum's modules are progressive: pupils explore themes more in depth as they move to higher grades. There are separate activities, stories, expressions, reflective questions and mindfulness activities for each grade from nursery to eight. Lessons include learning to be aware of one's emotions in nursery and understanding the purpose of one's body and one's self in grade eight.

== Impact ==
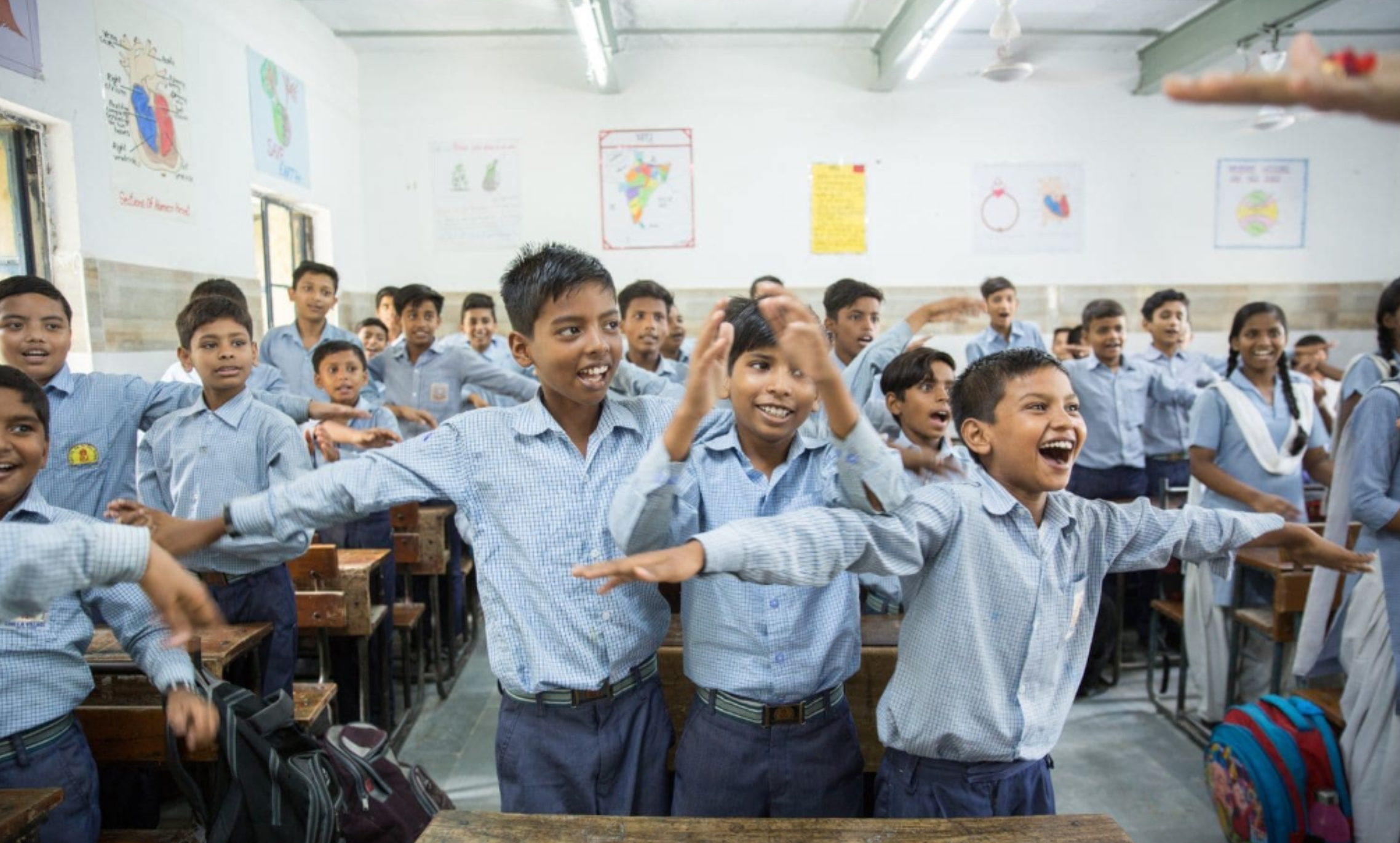
Pupils taking part in an activity in during a Happiness Class

The program is run in over a thousand Government of Delhi schools; according to Sisodia, "Mindfulness is practised by all 16 lakh [1.6 million] pupils everyday". Many teachers and parents have reported the pupils' interest in academics and their behaviour has improved because of the curriculum.

Dream a Dream in partnership with Brookings Institution conducted a pilot study in the year 2019 to design an assessment tool for Happiness Curriculum (HC) and published a report. The study was designed to complete the first step toward an evaluation of the program that would provide information to schools, nongovernment organization implementers, and government agencies concerning student and teacher adoption of the desired outcomes of the HC. To understand and assess the impact of the Happiness program, The two surveys were developed—one for students and one for teachers—reflecting factors aligned to the Happiness Curriculum objectives and learning outcomes. For future anticipated use in evaluation studies, the two surveys provided a basis to capture student and teacher functioning on various factors.

The report developed in collaboration with Dream a Dream reflects:

1. Impact on Students: Better relationship with teachers, increased participation inside the classroom and increased focus and mindfulness among students.
2. Impact on Teachers: Priorities values over academic success, changing teaching orientation and increased collaboration among teachers.

== Reception ==
The curriculum was praised by several media outlets, including Le Monde, World Economic Forum, and NPR, and was called a reformative step towards school education in India. Happiness classes have been visited by several institutional heads, academicians, officials from education departments of other state governments in India and abroad. Versions of the curriculum have been adopted by Indian states Andhra Pradesh and Uttarakhand. Afghanistan, Nepal, and the United Arab Emirates are also preparing to implement similar programs.

At the first anniversary celebration of the curriculum in July 2019, the Chief Justice of India Ranjan Gogoi praised it. During her visit to India, on 25 February 2020, the First Lady of the United States Melania Trump visited a happiness class at a school run by the Government of Delhi.

One of the many designers of the curriculum, working under the name Labhya Foundation, won the Harvard Social Impact Fund Competition of 2020.

== Response to COVID-19 pandemic ==
On 5 March 2020, the Government of Delhi issued orders to shut all of its primary schools to tackle the spread of COVID-19. This order was later extended to all educational institutions in the state. On 25 March, the Government of India announced a nationwide lockdown, and with increased stress and anxiety during the lockdown, delivery and execution of the Happiness Curriculum was taken to homes. Each parent received interactive voice response calls to guide them with "Happiness" activities, stories, and mindfulness practices.

== See also ==
- 21st century skills
- Outcome-based education
- Social emotional development
- Student-centred learning
- Patriotism Curriculum

== Bibliography ==
- Yadav, Mukesh (2019), Happiness Curriculum (PDF), State Council of Educational Research and Training, Delhi, ISBN 978-93-85943-72-0
