= Katie Arup =

British fencer

Personal information
- Born: 29 April 1963 (age 63) London, England

Sport
- Sport: Fencing

Katie Arup (born 29 April 1963) is a British fencer. She competed in the women's team foil event at the 1984 Summer Olympics.
