= Arup Bose =

Indian statistician

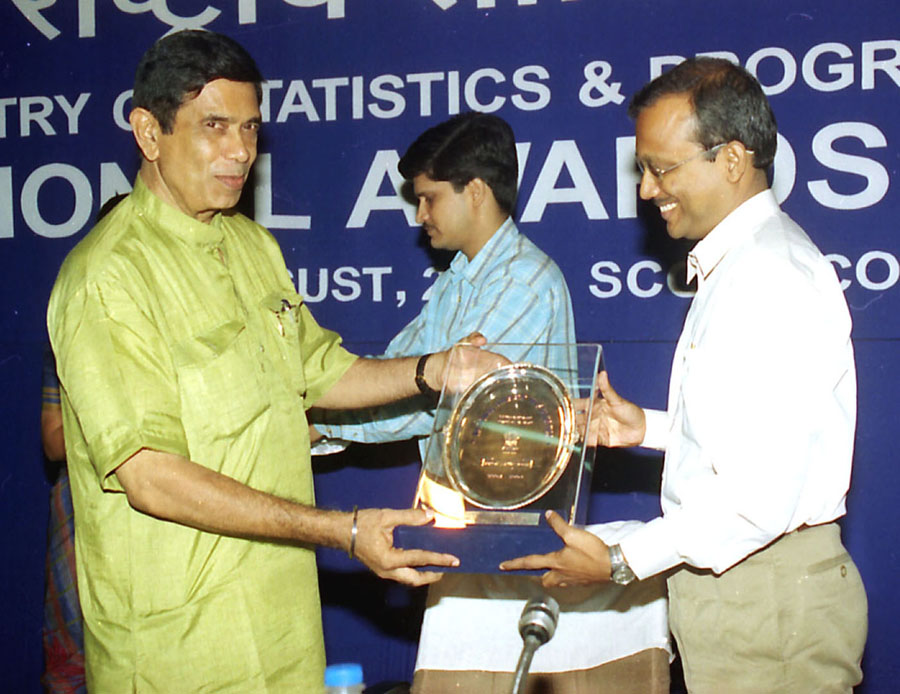
- Oscar Fernandes (left) presenting the National Award to Arup Bose (right, in white shirt) for 2002-2003 for his outstanding contribution in the field of statistics
- Born: 1 April 1959 (age 67)
- Education: Indian Statistical Institute
- Awards: Shanti Swarup Bhatnagar Prize for Science and Technology & International Statistical Institute Mahalanobish International award 2023
- Scientific career
- Fields: Statistics and probability
- Workplaces: Indian Statistical Institute, Kolkata

Arup Bose (born 1 April 1959) is an Indian statistician. He is a professor of theoretical statistics and mathematics, in Indian Statistical Institute, Kolkata.

Arup Bose obtained his B.Stat, M.Stat and Ph.D. (statistics) degrees from the Indian Statistical Institute, Kolkata where G. Jogesh Babu was his PhD supervisor. He then joined Purdue University, US, as an assistant professor. After four years at Purdue, he returned to India in 1991 and joined the Indian Statistical Institute, Kolkata as an associate professor and was promoted to full professorship in 1995. Most notable areas of his research include, sequential analysis, statistical estimation in diffusion processes, the law of large numbers and central limit theorems, resampling methods, censored data problems, M-estimation, U-statistics, time series, asymptotic properties of estimators and so on.

He is a member of Bernoulli Society for Mathematical Statistics and Probability, Netherlands, life member of Calcutta Statistical Association and a life member of Indian Mathematical Society.

He was awarded the Shanti Swarup Bhatnagar Prize for Science and Technology in 2004, the highest science award in India, in the mathematical sciences category.

He was an invited speaker in International Congress of Mathematicians 2010, Hyderabad on the topic of "Probability and Statistics."

== Other awards/honours ==
- Elected Fellow of Institute of Mathematical Statistics, USA, 2002
- National Award in Statistics in honour of Prof C. R. Rao for the year 2002–03
- Young Researcher Award, International Indian Statistical Association USA 2004
- Fellow of the Indian Academy of Sciences, Bangalore (2006)
- Fellow of the Indian National Science Academy, New Delhi (2007)
- Fellow of the National Academy of Sciences, Allahabad (2009)
- J. C. Bose Fellow, DST Govt. of India 2009–2013, 2013–2018
- Bernoulli Society Council Member, 2015–2019
