= Arup SenGupta =

Environmental engineer and scientist

Arup K. SenGupta
- Occupation: Environmental engineer/scientist

Academic background
- Education: B.S., Chemical Engineering; M.S., Environmental Engineering; Ph.D., Environmental Engineering
- Alma mater: Jadavpur University, India; University of Houston, TX, USA

Arup K. SenGupta is an environmental engineer/scientist. He is the P.C. Rossin Professor Emeritus at Lehigh University.

SenGupta's research interests have included evaluating and applying novel adsorption materials, reactive polymer compounds, and ion exchange mechanisms in hybrid separation and environmental control methods. He has received the Grainger Silver Prize Award from the National Academy of Engineering (NAE), the Lawrence K. Cecil Award from the American Institute of Chemical Engineers (AIChE), and the Simon W. Freese Environmental Engineering Award & Lecture from the American Society of Civil Engineers (ASCE).

== Education ==
SenGupta completed his B.S. in Chemical Engineering from Jadavpur University in 1973. He later received his MS in Environmental Engineering in 1982, followed by his PhD in Environmental Engineering in 1984 from the University of Houston.

== Career ==
SenGupta began his career as a process development engineer at the Kuljian Corporation from 1973 to 1980. At Lehigh University, he held multiple positions, including assistant professor from 1985 to 1990, and associate professor from 1990 to 1994. Between 1998 and 2005, he chaired the Department of Civil & Environmental Engineering at the same institution. He also worked there as a professor and holds the title of P.C. Rossin Professor Emeritus.

== Research ==
During his early research studies, SenGupta underscored that dissolved phosphates in wastewater induce eutrophication in reservoirs, coastal water regions, lakes, and confined water structures. In a group study, he eliminated phosphate as well as additional anions from water by employing a hybrid anion-exchange medium called HAIX, which contains a combination of HFO (hydrated ferric oxide) and anion-exchange resin beads. Together with Cumbal, he demonstrated that HFO nanoparticles within an anion exchanger had greater arsenic removal than a cation exchanger.

SenGupta also highlighted the potential of incorporating magnetic nanoparticles into polymer matrices to recover harmful metals such as arsenic, emphasizing that it is a highly toxic naturally occurring groundwater contaminant. In a collaborative study, he demonstrated the potential of combining polymers and metal oxide nanoparticles in limiting dispersibility, aggregation, a lack of reaction specificity in complex mediums, and lower mechanical strength. He also highlighted that these shortcomings can be addressed by dispersing nanoparticles into polymeric and biopolymeric matrices. As per Scopus, his research work has been cited 6,337 times.

== Awards and honors ==
- 1994 – Rudolph Hering Medal, ASCE
- 2001 – Frontier in Research Award, Association of Environmental Engineering and Science Professors (AEESP)
- 2005 – Mondialogo Engineering Award, Daimler-Chrysler and UNESCO
- 2007 – Grainger Silver Prize Award, NAE
- 2009 – Lawrence K. Cecil Award, AIChE
- 2009 – Astellas Foundation Award, American Chemical Society (ACS)
- 2012 – Intel Environmental Award, TechAwards
- 2014 – Fellow, NAI
- 2025 – Simon W. Freese Environmental Engineering Award & Lecture, ASCE

== Bibliography ==
=== Books ===
- SenGupta, Arup K.; Marcus, Yitzhak (2004). Ion Exchange and Solvent Extraction: A Series of Advances, Volume 17. CRC Press. ISBN 9780203027301.
- SenGupta, Arup K. (2017). Ion Exchange in Environmental Processes: Fundamentals, Applications and Sustainable Technology. Wiley. ISBN 9781119157397.
- SenGupta, Arup K. (2019). Environmental Separation of Heavy Metals: Engineering Processes. Taylor & Francis Group. ISBN 9780367396954.

=== Selected articles ===
- Zhao, D.; Sengupta, A. K. (1998). "Ultimate removal of phosphate from wastewater using a new class of polymeric ion exchangers". Water Research. 32 (5): 1613–1625. Bibcode:1998WatRe..32.1613Z. doi:10.1016/S0043-1354(97)00371-0.
- DeMarco, M. J.; SenGupta, A. K.; Greenleaf, J. E. (2003). "Arsenic removal using a polymeric/inorganic hybrid sorbent". Water Research. 37 (1): 164–176. Bibcode:2003WatRe..37..164D. doi:10.1016/S0043-1354(02)00238-5. PMID 12465798.
- Cumbal, L.; SenGupta, A. K. (2005). "Arsenic removal using polymer-supported hydrated iron (III) oxide nanoparticles: role of Donnan membrane effect". Environmental Science & Technology. 39 (17): 6508–6515. doi:10.1021/es050175e. PMID 16190206.
- Blaney, L. M.; Cinar, S.; SenGupta, A. K. (2007). "Hybrid anion exchanger for trace phosphate removal from water and wastewater". Water Research. 41 (7): 1603–1613. Bibcode:2007WatRe..41.1603B. doi:10.1016/j.watres.2007.01.008. PMID 17306856.
- Sarkar, S.; Guibal, E.; Quignard, F.; SenGupta, A. K. (2012). "Polymer-supported metals and metal oxide nanoparticles: synthesis, characterization, and applications". Journal of Nanoparticle Research. 14 (2): 715. Bibcode:2012JNR....14..715S. doi:10.1007/s11051-011-0715-2.
