= National Institute of Labour Economics Research and Development =

Indian think tank and research institute

National Institute of Labour Economics Research and Development (NILERD)
- Established: 1962; 64 years ago
- President: Suman Bery
- Chair: B. V. R. Subrahmanyam
- Director: Jayant Singh
- Owner: NITI Aayog, Government of India
- Formerly called: Institute of Applied Manpower Research (1962-2014)
- Address: Sector A-7, Narela Institutional Area, Delhi, Delhi-110040
- Location: Delhi, India
- Coordinates: 28.843901942891023°N 77.105267°E
- Interactive map of National Institute of Labour Economics Research and Development (NILERD)
- Website: https://nilerd.ac.in

The National Institute of Labour Economics Research and Development (NILERD) is an Indian autonomous institute under NITI Aayog and the Government of India.

It was established in 1962 as the Institute of Applied Manpower Research (IAMR) under the Societies Registration Act of 1860, to serve as a center for ideas and policy research on human capital development. Renamed in 2014, NILERD primarily receives funding from the NITI Aayog and the Government of India, supplemented by revenue from research projects and educational activities. It currently contributes to addressing national priorities and advancing research, education, and training in human resource planning and development.

Situated in Narela, Delhi, NILERD's campus provides facilities for academic pursuits, including residential accommodations and modern infrastructure.

== See also ==
- Labour in India
- Economy of India
- NITI Aayog
