= Gajendra Pal Singh Raghava =

Indian bio-informatician

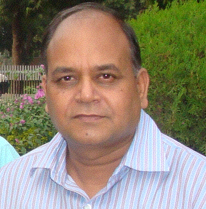
- G. P. S. Raghava
- Born: 25 May 1963 (age 63); Bulandshahr, Uttar Pradesh, India
- Occupation: bioinformatics
- Awards: Shanti Swarup Bhatnagar Prize (2008), National Bioscience Award for Career Development (2006)
- Scientific career
- Fields: Bioinformatics
- Workplaces: Indraprastha Institute of Information Technology
- Website: webs.iiitd.edu.in/raghava/

Gajendra Pal Singh Raghava is an Indian bio-informatician and Professor at Indraprastha Institute of Information Technology.

== Personal ==
=== Early years and education ===
Raghava was born in village Nagla Karan, Bulandshahr district (UP), India in 1963. He completed his primary education from his native place Bulandshahr and post graduation from Meerut, UP in 1984. After completing his MTech from Indian Institute of Technology, New Delhi, he joined Institute of Microbial Technology as a computer scientist. There he continued to work on various projects and became the head of Bioinformatics Centre in 1994. In 1996 he received a doctorate in bioinformatics from Institute of Microbial Technology and Panjab University, Chandigarh.

=== Career and higher studies ===
Raghava joined the Institute of Microbial Technology, Chandigarh in 1986 as a computer scientist and developer. He is also coordinator of the distributed information centre supported by DBT under the BTISNET programme, where his primary duty is to build and maintain infrastructure required for protein modelling and engineering.

He worked as a postdoctoral fellow at Oxford university as well as at the European Bioinformatics Institute (EBI) at Cambridge for two years (1996–98). During this period he learned and developed a number of web servers for application in computational biology, particularly in protein modelling.

=== Achievements and awards ===
G P S Raghava receiving National Bioscience Award from Science and Technology minister Shri Kapil Sibal

Raghava received the Young Leader Award in Science & Technology, Lakshmipat Singhania – Indian Institute of Management Lucknow National Leadership awards 2011 He was listed as one of eight highly cited Indians scientists by Thomson Reuters in 2014. He was awarded NASI-Reliance Industries Platinum Jubilee Awards, 2009 in Biological Sciences Thomson Reuters presented him Research Excellence ~ India Research Front Awards 2009. He received the Shanti Swarup Bhatnagar Prize for Science and Technology for 2008

=== Scientific recognitions ===
- He was elected as Fellow of National Academy of Sciences by for his excellent contribution in the field of Bioinformatics.
- He was elected Fellow of the Indian Academy of Sciences, Banglore for his excellent contribution in the field of Bioinformatics.
- Raghava has H-index 100 and I10-index more than 296 in as per his Google scholar profile.
- He is member of editorial board of number of scientific journals.

== Research interests ==
Raghava developed a method for calculating concentration of antibodies and antigens from ELISA data, and he a prediction method for protein secondary structure prediction. In 1999 he established his research group at IMTECH with emphasis on protein structure prediction and genome annotation. In 2001, his group also focused on "Computer aided vaccine design" with emphasis on subunit vaccine design. Since 2006, his group is trying to integrate bioinformatics, chemoinformatics, pharmaco-informatics and clinical informatics in order to develop a single platform for designing drugs in silico.

== Web services and software ==
Raghava is an adherent of public domain software or open source software, and his group both uses and develops free software for academic use. Recently his group have initiated a web portal Computational Resource for Drug Discovery (CRDD) under Open Source Drug Discovery.

== Works ==
- OSDDlinux A customized linux operating system for drug discovery
- GlycoEP : In silico Platform for Prediction of N-, O- and C-Glycosites in Eukaryotic Protein Sequences. PLoS ONE 8(6): e67008
- Lbtope: Improved Method for Linear B-Cell Epitope Prediction Using Antigen's Primary Sequence. PLoS ONE 8(5): e62216
- Open Source Software and Web Services for Designing Therapeutic Molecule
- Freeware in Science A google plus community on Freeware in the field of Science.
- HIVcoPred: A server for prediction of HIV coreceptor usage (CCR5).
- TumorHPD: Computational approach for designing tumor homing peptides. Scientific Reports 3: 1607
- CellPPD: In silico approaches for designing highly effective cell penetrating peptides. Journal of Translational Medicine 2013, 11:74 .
- MDRIpred : A web server for predicting inhibitors against drug tolerant M. Tuberculosis, published in Chemistry Central Journal
- CancerDR: Cancer Drug Resistance Database. Scientific Reports 3, 1445
- CSIR-Informatics Portal: Web Servers and software developed by CSIR, INDIA
- ToxinPred: In Silico Approach for Predicting Toxicity of Peptides and Proteins.
