= Comparative rating index of sovereigns =

Comparative rating index of sovereigns (CRIS) is a method for credit rating sovereign countries as a relative measure to other countries. This is an alternative method to the more common absolute grade issued by major credit rating agencies as shown in the list of countries by credit rating.

The CRIS method was introduced by India in 2012 as an attempt to solve the perceived limits of the existing rating system where a particular nation's rating score is independent of the performance of other nations. Performance of one nation is compared with all other nations. A nation might have travelled down the rating ladder in absolute terms. But it may be, in relative terms, better off because others have done even worse. This relative performance cannot be measured in the present system but can be by using the CRIS rating.

An example of comparative rating is the percentile score—the way GATE results are at times given. If a student is described as belonging to the 99th percentile, it clearly says something about this student’s performance vis-à-vis other students.

== History ==
In 2012, the Ministry of Finance, India calculated this new index and ranked 101 economies for the years 2007 to 2011.

The CRIS scores for India were 66.47 (2007) and 69.83 (2011). In other words, in relative terms India has become a better investment destination by 5.06%. In addition, India’s rank in terms of CRIS has moved up from 61st to 55th. If we view the rankings in terms of quintiles (blocks of one-fifth of the distribution) India moves from the fourth quintile to the third, that is, the middle quintile.

As expected the CRIS score for Greece has dropped sharply from 74.24 in 2007 to 13.97 in 2011—a decline of 81%; and that of Ireland and Portugal have dropped by more than 14%. In terms of CRIS, the U.S. has seen its score rise from 78.20 to 81.81. This is accompanied by a loss of rank from the top of the chart to the 16th position. This shows that CRIS is distinct from a percentile score which is also a relative measure of status. In 2007 the 1st rank was shared between 20 economies but by 2011 this cohort had shrunk to 15.

Between 2007 and 2011, all the BRICS countries had improvements in rank as well as index value. The improvement in CRIS scores of nations such as India, China and Indonesia are partly due to the dramatic falls of scores of some European nations leading to a deterioration of the world average by over 4.8%.

The ten highest increases in the CRIS from 2007 to 2011 were achieved by (1) Paraguay (31.26%), (2) Lebanon (22.71%), (3) Bolivia (21.2%), (4) Uruguay (18.09%), (5) Belize and Nicaragua (both 15.63%), (7) Philippines (14.26%), (8) Indonesia (12.83%), (9) Peru (12.75%) and (10) Ecuador (12.27%). In interpreting these results, it needs to be borne in mind that for countries which began with low CRIS values, the scope for improvement is more. Seventeen economies had negative growth in the CRIS across this period. The ten highest decreases were (1) Greece (−81.19%), (2) Portugal (−14.82%), (3) Ireland (−14.14%), (4) Iceland (−11.52%), (5) Belarus (−10.05%), (6) Jamaica (−7.45%), (7) Egypt (−7.16%), (8) Cyprus (−5.94%), (9) Pakistan (−5.83%) and (10) Hungary (−4.66%).

== Calculation ==
The computation of CRIS is calculated by the Indian government based on Moody's ratings and data on the GDPs (not adjusted for purchasing power parity (PPP)) of different nations as given by the International Monetary Fund. It is a pure mathematical and statistical methods without interventions or interpretations. The full paper is, as of July 2015, classified.

== Advantages ==
When an investor searches across nations for a place to invest their money, the relative rating of nations is important. If nation x’s rating remaining the same, other nations’ ratings improve over time, there may well be a case to invest less in nation x.
