= Anil Koul =

Indian scientist (born 1972)

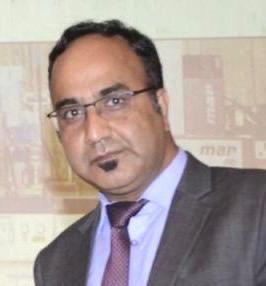
- Born: 1 June 1972 (age 54); India
- Education: Max-Planck Institute for Biochemistry (MPI), Munich Germany & CSIR-IGIB Delhi and Delhi University, India
- Awards: American Chemical Society (ACS) - Heroes of Chemistry Award (2020); Sun Pharma Research Award (2017); Johnson Medal (2013); Swiss-TB prize (2005)
- Scientific career
- Workplaces: Institute of Microbial Technology, Chandigarh 160036, India. LSHTM, London, UK.

Anil Koul (born 1 June 1972) is a scientist and former Director of India's CSIR-Institute of Microbial Technology (IMTECH). He is also the vice president and Head of Global Public Health discovery at Johnson & Johnson. He is member of Board of Directors of Janssen Pharmaceutica NV, the European subsidiary of J&J. He is also a professor of Translational Discovery at London School of Hygiene and Tropical Medicine (LSHTM).

His major scientific career achievement is his key role in the discovery and development of a new tuberculosis drug, bedaquiline, the first drug approved in 45 years for treatment of drug-resistant tuberculosis. Koul has been awarded a number of awards for his contribution to discovery of Bedaquiline.

== Early life and education ==
Koul was born in Srinagar, Kashmir and completed his secondary school education in Srinagar till 1990 and further bachelor's and master's degrees from Delhi University. Koul obtained his PhD at Delhi University and at Max-Planck Institute (MPI) of Biochemistry in Germany in 2001.

== Career ==
Koul's initial research focused on kinase and phosphatase in the laboratory of Axel Ullrich at MPI and subsequently in Axxima Pharmaceuticals, a biotech company in Munich. In 2004, Koul joined the US multinational Johnson & Johnson, He worked as senior director and headed its respiratory infections discovery unit based in Europe and US. In late 2016, Anil moved to India to run the CSIR-IMTECH in Chandigarh.

== Scientific contributions ==
Koul's key achievement has been as one of the core scientist at J&J involved in discovery of multi drug-resistant tuberculosis drug Bedaquiline. Bedaquiline has been conditionally approved in US, Europe and several high TB burden countries like India, China and South Africa. In 2013, the World Health Organization (WHO) put bedaquiline on list of its essential medicines. Bedaquiline received a prestigious Prix Galien Award for most innovative Orphan Drug (UK) in 2016. In 2019, India's Health Ministry made bedaquiline available across more than 500 drug-resistant TB centers in India to help India's End TB program. To date, bedaquiline has been approved for use in more than 60 countries and is part of national TB eradication plans across the world. In 2020, US FDA approved new pediatric formulation of Bedaquiline (>=5 years).

Koul has extensive scientific contributions to drug discovery and translational research. Koul and his team have discovered more than 3 other drug candidates, two of which are into late stage human testing including one for serious respiratory viral infections (RSV). Koul has several publications in leading journals like Nature and Science and more than 25 international patents to his credit.

As Director IMTECH, he oversaw R&D and non R&D staff of more than 350 people and was responsible for scientific strategy, finance, general administration, business development, procurement, communication & public relations. At IMTECH, Koul played a pivotal role in establishing new research divisions like medicinal chemistry, and virology centers. He established several industry-academia partnerships like Zydus Cadila and a high end skill development centre in partnership with MERCK. In 2018, IMTECH's Bioinformatics Unit was among top institutions in world in number of biological databases. Koul made policy changes including 'ease of doing science' and a new centralized admin block.

Koul has played key roles in several high level government committees.

== Awards and honors ==
In 2020, American Chemical Society awarded Koul along with two of his colleagues the Heroes of Chemistry Award for the discovery of bedaquiline.

In 2017, Koul was conferred with 'Sun Pharma Science Foundation Award' by India's Health Minister for his contribution to discovery of bedaquiline. He was also awarded with the 'Swiss-TB Award' (2005) by the Swiss Foundation for Pneumology Research and Johnson Medal (2013).

He has featured in Voice of America's (VOI) radio news analysis and India's electronic news channels (NDTV) 'Every Life Counts Program'.

== Board membership ==
Koul has served on a number of corporate boards, including.

- Scientific Advisory Board Member, CSIR.
- Research Council Member of CSIR-Central Drug Research Institute, Lucknow.
- Board of Directors, Technology Business Incubator, Kalinga Institute of Industrial Technology, Bhubaneswar.
- Member of Board of Directors, Janssen Pharmaceuticals NV, Belgium.
