= IIIT =

IIIT is an initialism that may refer to:

- Indian Institutes of Information Technology, a group of institutes of higher education in India
- Indraprastha Institute of Information Technology, Delhi, an autonomous university in Delhi, India
- International Institutes of Information Technology (disambiguation), one of several higher-education institutes in India
- International Institute of Islamic Thought, an American non-profit organization
