= IIIT Pune =

IIIT Pune may refer to:

- Indian Institute of Information Technology, Pune
- International Institute of Information Technology, Pune
