= Institute of Microbial Technology =

CSIR establishments in Chandigarh, India

Coordinates: 30.7471°N 76.7342°E

- Established: 1984; 42 years ago
- Director: Dr. Alka Rao
- Address: www.imtech.res.in
- Location: Sector 39A, Chandigarh, India, Chandigarh, India

The Institute of Microbial Technology (IMTECH), based in Chandigarh, India, is one of the constituent establishments of the Council of Scientific & Industrial Research (CSIR). It was established in 1984.

The institute is engaged in research in many areas of modern biological sciences and microbe-related biotechnology, with special emphasis on research that is interdisciplinary and of a collaborative nature, such as immunity and infectious diseases, protein design and engineering, fermentation science, microbial physiology and genetics, yeast biology, bioinformatics, microbial systematics, exploitation of microbial diversity for bioactives and enzymes for biotransformations. Present Director is Dr Alka Rao, and former directors were Dr Sanjeev Khosla, Dr Anil Koul, and Dr Girish Sahni.

== Facilities ==
The institute is equipped with facilities for modern biology research. They include lab-to-pilot-scale fermenter of many capacities, tissue and cell culture facility, facility for maintenance, preservation and identification of micro-organisms, an animal house, workstations for bioinformatics and biocomputing, equipment for protein and DNA analysis, a library with around 64,000 references books, microscopy equipment, and databases for intellectual property management. The institute is equipped with biosafety level 3 (BSL3) laboratory facility for research work on pathogenic microorganisms.

== Achievements ==
Patented natural, recombinant and clot specific Streptokinase as a vital lifesaving drug.

== Academics ==
The institute offers Ph.D. jointly with the Academy of Scientific and Innovative Research (AcSIR), Ghaziabad, Uttar Pradesh, India.

== Computational Resources for Drug Discovery ==
CRDD (Computational Resource for Drug Discovery) is a module of the in silico module of Open Source Drug Discovery (OSDD). The CRDD web portal provides computer resources related to drug discovery on a single platform. This module is developed and maintained under the guidance of Gajendra Pal Singh Raghava at CSIR-Institute of Microbial Technology.

== Controversy of fake data ==
On 17 July 2014, mainstream media in India published reports about retraction of a total seven papers published by scientists at IMTECH in various journals. This was done after establishing that the data used in these papers were fake/fabricated.

Three papers published in PLoS ONE were retracted, and four papers in other journals are in the process of being retracted. All the three PLoS ONE papers have Dr. Fazlurrahman Khan, Research Associate, as the first author and Dr. Swaranjit Singh Cameotra from the Environmental Biotechnology and Microbial Biochemistry Laboratory as the corresponding author. They were published online on April 17, October 1 and October 8 respectively. Unfortunately, these papers have been cited by five other papers.

This came as a huge shock to the scientific community in India since CSIR and its constituent bodies are considered to be among the top research organizations in the country.

== Bioinformatics services ==
More than 150 free and open source software, databases and web-servers has been developed at the Institute of Microbial Technology, Chandigarh. These servers are heavily used by scientific community worldwide.
