= Mohit Gupta =

Indian cardiologist

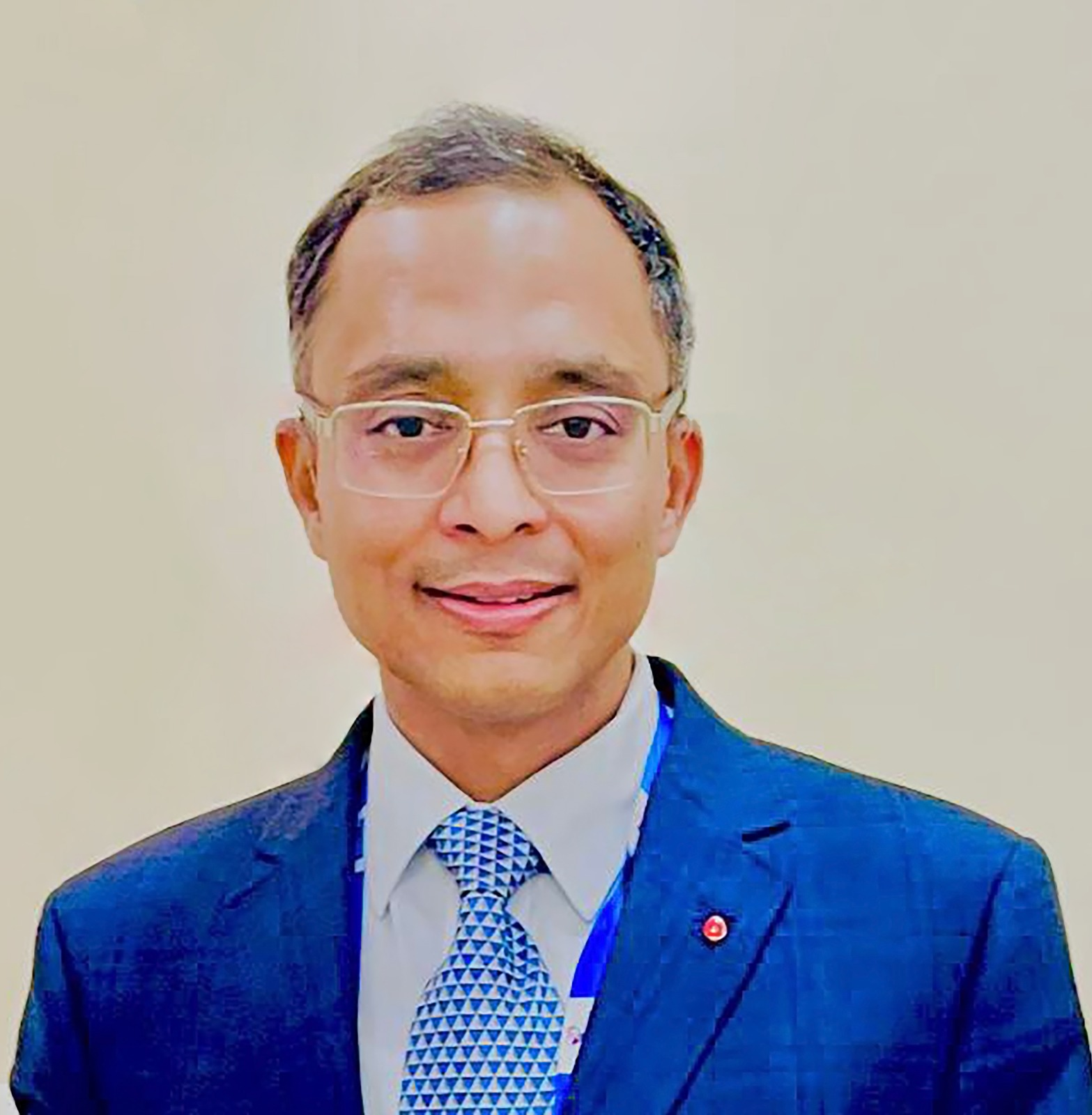
- Born: 1-09-1974
- Occupations: Doctor and professor

Mohit Gupta is a professor of cardiology at GB Hospital and Maulana Azad Medical College in New Delhi. Gupta is associated with the Brahma Kumaris.

An artificial intelligence model developed by Indraprastha Institute of Information Technology (IIIT)-Delhi in collaboration with cardiologists from G B Pant Hospital and Harvard Medical School. Gupta was the principal investigator of the project. Delhi Doctors develop a system to prevent post-heart attack failure. This model has been specially designed for predicting the chances of a patient dying within 30 days of suffering a heart attack or surviving. In 2018, he was conferred with the Excellence in Cardiology by the Government of India for his work in the field of medicine. He resides in New Delhi, India.

== Awards and honours ==
- 2021, Received Best Cardiology Innovation award for the year 2021, By Cardiology Society of India: For pioneering work on Artificial Intelligence in Heart attack patients
- 2021, Received DMA Excellence award: for outstanding contribution for the year 2021 in the Covid 19
- 2019, Honored by Association of Physicians of India Delhi branch with Prof KL Wig Oration in December 2019. - Talk on Genes, Emotions and Mind power

== Publications ==
Prevalence and patterns of coronary artery anomalies in 28,800 adult patients undergoing angiography in a large tertiary care centre in India.
