= IIT =

IIT may refer to:

== Educational institutions ==
=== Americas ===
- Illinois Institute of Technology, a research university in Chicago, Illinois, United States
- Indiana Institute of Technology, Fort Wayne, Indiana, United States
- Institute for Information Technology, a research institute of the National Research Council Canada
- Islamic Institute of Toronto, Toronto, Canada

=== Asia ===
- Mindanao State University – Iligan Institute of Technology, a research university in the Philippines
- Indian Institutes of Technology, a group of higher education institutes in India
- Informatics Institute of Technology, Wellawatta, Sri Lanka
- Inha Institute of Technology, the parent institution of Inha University, Incheon, South Korea
- Institute of Information Technology, University of Dhaka, Dhaka, Bangladesh
- Institute of Information Technology, Noakhali Science and Technology University, Noakhali, Bangladesh
- International Institute of Technology, the previous name of Sirindhorn International Institute of Technology, Pathum Thani, Thailand
- Technion – Israel Institute of Technology, a research university in Haifa, Israel
- İzmir Institute of Technology, İzmir, Turkey

=== Others ===
- Institute for Industrial Technology, a technical vocational school in Lagos, Nigeria
- IIT Madrid (Instituto de Investigación Tecnológica), a research institute in Madrid, Spain
- Istituto Italiano di Tecnologia, Genoa, Italy

== Other uses ==
- Infantry Immersion Trainer, a mixed reality training facility prototype
- Integrated Information Technology, a semiconductor company, now 8x8, Inc.
- Integrated information theory, a theoretical framework for consciousness
- Intra-industry trade, the exchange of products belonging to the same industry
- Indosat's NYSE ticker symbol
- I-It relationship, from I and Thou, a book by Martin Buber

== See also ==
- IIIT (disambiguation)
- ITT (disambiguation)
