= Girish Sahni =

Indian biotechnologist (1956–2024)

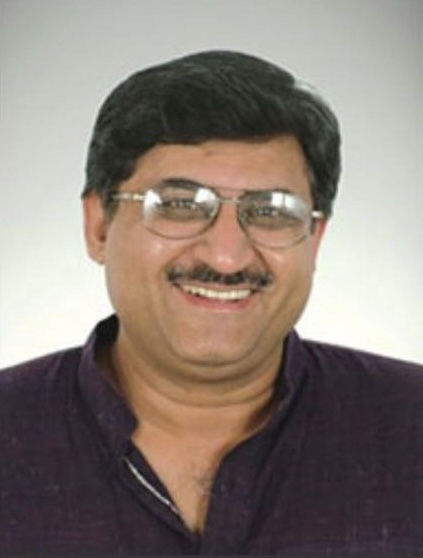
- Official portrait
- Born: 2 March 1956; India
- Died: 19 August 2024 (aged 68); Chandigarh, India
- Education: Indian Institute of Science
- Known for: Development of indigenous recombinant streptokinase (clot-buster drug)
- Scientific career
- Fields: Biotechnology
- Workplaces: Council of Scientific and Industrial Research; Institute of Microbial Technology

Girish Sahni (2 March 1956 – 19 August 2024) was an Indian biotechnologist and science administrator. He served as the Director-General of the Council of Scientific and Industrial Research (CSIR) and Secretary to the Department of Scientific and Industrial Research (DSIR), Government of India, from 2015 to 2018. Prior to this, he was Director of the CSIR-Institute of Microbial Technology (IMTECH), Chandigarh, from 2005 to 2015. In 2014, he received the Vigyan Ratna Award, India's highest national recognition for scientists, awarded under the Rashtriya Vigyan Puraskar (RVP) for lifetime achievements and profound contributions to any field of science and technology by the Government of India

== Early life and education ==
Girish Sahni was born on 2 March 1956 in India. He obtained his PhD from the Indian Institute of Science, Bengaluru. He later pursued post-doctoral research at the University of California, Santa Barbara, Rockefeller University, New York, and the Albert Einstein College of Medicine, New York.

== Career ==
Sahni joined the CSIR-Institute of Microbial Technology (IMTECH) in 1991. Over the years, he rose through the ranks and became Director of the institute in 2005.

In 2015, Sahni was appointed Director-General of the Council of Scientific and Industrial Research (CSIR), one of the largest publicly funded research and development organizations in the world. Concurrently, he served as Secretary to the Department of Scientific and Industrial Research (DSIR).

After completing his tenure in 2018, he continued to mentor young scientists and remained engaged with the scientific community.

== Research and contributions ==
Sahni's research focused primarily on cardiovascular biology and biotechnology. He is best known for his role in the development of recombinant streptokinase, India's first indigenous clot-dissolving drug used in the treatment of heart attacks.

== Awards ==
- National Bioscience Award for Career Development – Department of Biotechnology, Government of India
- Vigyan Ratna Award (2014)
- Om Prakash Bhasin Award (2013)
- Vasvik Industrial Award (2000)

== Death ==
Girish Sahni died on 19 August 2024 at the age of 68. His death was widely mourned by the scientific and academic communities in India.
