= Pankaj Jalote =

Indian engineer

- Website: http://www.iiitd.edu.in/~jalote/

Pankaj Jalote was the founding Director of Indraprastha Institute of Information Technology. Jalote is a Fellow of the IEEE and INAE.

Before joining IIIT Delhi, he worked as the Microsoft Chair Professor at the Department of Computer Science and Engineering at IIT Delhi. Jalote has also taught at the Department of Computer Science at IIT Kanpur and University of Maryland.

== Education ==
Prof Jalote completed his BTech from IIT Kanpur in 1980, M.S. from Pennsylvania State University in 1982 and PhD from University of Illinois at Urbana-Champaign in 1985.

== Articles and books published ==
Prof Jalote has published numerous papers and articles in leading journals and newspapers.

He has authored following books:

- Building Research Universities in India, SAGE Publishing
- Software Project Management in Practice, Addison Wesley
- CMM in Practice: Processes for executing software projects at Infosys, Addison Wesley
- An Integrated Approach to Software Engineering, Springer, New York
- Fault Tolerance in Distributed Systems, Prentice Hall
- Software Engineering: A Precise Approach, Wesley
