= International Institute of Information Technology =

International Institute of Information Technology may refer to one of several unrelated higher education institutes in India:

- International Institute of Information Technology, Bangalore, in Karnataka, India
- International Institute of Information Technology, Bhubaneswar, in Odisha, India
- International Institute of Information Technology, Hyderabad, in Telangana, India
- International Institute of Information Technology, Naya Raipur, in Chhattisgarh, India
- International Institute of Information Technology, Pune, in Maharashtra, India

== See also ==
- Indian Institutes of Information Technology
- Indraprastha Institute of Information Technology, Delhi
