= Graduate Aptitude Test in Engineering =

Aptitude test for sciences undergraduates

- Official logo of GATE 2027
- Acronym: GATE
- Type: Computer-based standardized test
- Administrator: IIT Madras (2027); Conducted jointly by IISc and 7 IITs on behalf of the National Co-ordination Board – GATE, Department of Higher Education, Ministry of Education, Government of India.
- Skills tested: Bachelor's degree level knowledge of the chosen engineering or science discipline.
- Purpose: Post-graduate engineering admissions, screening for entry-level engineering jobs in Public Sector Undertakings (PSUs) and central Civil Services in Central Government Organisations
- Year started: 1983 (43 years ago)
- Duration: 3 hours
- Score range: Marks (unscaled) out of 100, in 0.33 point increments. Score (scaled) out of 1000, in 1 point increments.
- Score validity: 3 years
- Offered: One time every year (usually in February).
- Regions: Over 1000+ centres in India, Nepal, Singapore, Sri Lanka, Bangladesh, Ethiopia and United Arab Emirates.
- Languages: English
- Annual number of test takers: ▲797,434 (2026)
- Prerequisites: Third year student or graduate of Bachelor's degree (or equivalent) in engineering/ architecture or Master's degree (or equivalent) in science, computer applications can apply for GATE
- Fee: INR ₹1000 for Indian Female, SC, ST and Physically challenged candidates. INR ₹ 2000 for all other Indian candidates.
- Used by: Various Indian engineering colleges offering post-graduate education, several public sector entities, central government organisations for recruiting engineers, scientists, officers etc.
- Qualification rate: ▲19.60% (2026)
- Website: gate2027.iitm.ac.in (for GATE 2027)

The Graduate Aptitude Test in Engineering (GATE) exam is an entrance examination conducted in India for admission to technical postgraduate programs that tests the undergraduate subjects of engineering and sciences. GATE is conducted jointly by the Indian Institute of Science and seven Indian Institutes of Technology at Roorkee, Delhi, Guwahati, Kanpur, Kharagpur, Chennai and Mumbai on behalf of the National Coordination Board – GATE, Department of Higher Education, Ministry of Education (MoE), Government of India. It is considered to be one of the toughest examinations in the world.

The GATE score of a candidate reflects the relative performance level of a candidate. The score is used for admissions to various post-graduate education programs (e.g. Master of Engineering, Master of Technology, Master of Architecture, Doctor of Philosophy) in Indian higher education institutes, with financial assistance provided by MoE and other government agencies. GATE scores are also used by several Indian public sector undertakings for recruiting graduate engineers in entry-level positions. It is one of the most competitive examinations in India. GATE is also recognized by various institutes outside India, such as Nanyang Technological University in Singapore.

== Eligibility ==
The following students are eligible to take the GATE exam:

- Bachelor's degree holders in Engineering / Technology / Architecture (3 years after 10+2/ 10+2+3(ongoing)/ 10+2+4(ongoing)/ Post-B.Sc./ Post-Diploma) and those who are in the final year of such programs ( Also prefinal year of B.tech).
- Master's degree holders in any branch of Science/Mathematics/Statistics/Computer Applications or equivalent and those who are in the final year of such programs.
- Candidates in the second or final-year integrated master's degree programs (Post-B.Sc.) in Engineering / Technology.
- Candidates in the fourth or higher year of five-year integrated master's degree programs or Dual Degree programs in Engineering / Technology.
- Candidates with qualifications obtained through examinations conducted by professional societies recognized by UGC/AICTE (e.g. AMIE by IE(India), AMICE by the Institute of Civil Engineers (India)-ICE(I), AMIETE By IETE(India)) as equivalent to B.E./B.Tech.
- A candidate who is currently studying in the 3rd or higher years of any undergraduate degree program OR has already completed any government approved degree program in
- Engineering / Technology / Architecture / Science / Commerce / Arts is eligible to appear for GATE 2022 examination. Those who have completed section A or equivalent of such professional courses are also eligible.

There is no age limit criterion defined by the exam conducting authority to appear in the GATE exam.

== Disciplines, structure, syllabus, and marking scheme ==
=== Disciplines ===
At present (GATE 2027), the GATE exam is conducted in the following 30 disciplines. A candidate can select any one or two of these subjects relevant to their discipline.

GATE Paper	Code
Aerospace Engineering	AE
Agricultural Engineering	AG
Architecture and Planning	AR
Biomedical	BM
Biotechnology	BT
Civil Engineering	CE
Chemical Engineering	CH
Computer Science and Information Technology	CS
Chemistry	CY
Data Science and Artificial Intelligence	DA
Electronics and Communication Engineering	EC
Electrical Engineering	EE
Environmental Science and Engineering	ES
Ecology and Evolution	EY
Geomatics Engineering	GE
Geology and Geophysics	GG
Instrumentation Engineering	IN
Mathematics	MA
Mechanical Engineering	ME
Mining Engineering	MN
Metallurgical Engineering	MT
Naval Architecture and Marine Engineering	NM
Petroleum Engineering	PE
Physics	PH
Production and Industrial Engineering	PI
Robotics and Automation	RA
Statistics	ST
Engineering Sciences	XE^{*}
Humanities and Social Sciences	XH**
Life Sciences	XL^{***}

The paper sections under XE*, XH** and XL*** are broader "catch all" type with specific sub-subjects defined by some dedicated codes as listed in the following table. The first section XE0 / XL0 / XH0 is compulsory and carries weightage as indicated; balance weightage is for the chosen specific sub-subject(s).

Engineering Sciences (XE^{*}) Paper Sections (XE0 and any 2 of XE1 to XE9)	Code	Life Sciences (XL^{***}) Paper Sections (XL0 and any 2 of XL1 to XL5)	Code	Humanities and Social Sciences (XH^{**}) Paper Sections (XH0 and any 1 of XH1 to XH6)	Code
Engineering Mathematics (Compulsory 15%)	XE0	Chemistry (Compulsory 25%)	XL0	Reasoning and Comprehension (Compulsory 25%)	XH0
Fluid mechanics	XE1	Biochemistry	XL1	Economics	XH1
Materials Science	XE2	Botany	XL2	English	XH2
Solid Mechanics	XE3	Microbiology	XL3	Linguistics	XH3
Thermodynamics	XE4	Zoology	XL4	Philosophy	XH4
Polymer Science and Engineering	XE5	Food technology	XL5	Psychology	XH5
Food technology	XE6			Sociology	XH6
Atmospheric and Oceanic Sciences	XE7				
Energy Science	XE8				
Textile Engineering & Fiber Science	XE9				

=== Duration and examination type ===
The examination is 3 hours long, and contains a total of 65 questions worth a maximum of 100 marks. The examination for all the papers is carried out in an online Computer Based Test (CBT) mode where the candidates are shown questions in a random sequence on a computer screen.

The questions consist of some Multiple Choice Questions or MCQs (four answer options out of which only ONE is correct, which has to be chosen). The remaining questions may be of Multiple Select Questions or MSQs (four answer options out of which ONE or MORE than ONE is/are correct, hence correct options need to be chosen) and/or Numerical Answer Type questions or NATs (answer is a real number, to be entered via an on-screen keypad and computer mouse).

=== Syllabus ===
- Verbal Ability: English grammar, sentence completion, verbal analogies, word groups, instructions, critical reasoning and verbal deduction.
- Numerical Ability: Numerical computation, numerical estimation, numerical reasoning and data interpretation.
- Engineering Mathematics (not for all papers)
- Technical Ability: Technical questions related to the paper chosen

=== Questions and marking scheme ===
The examination consists of a total of 65 questions, consisting of one-mark and two-mark questions. Out of 65 questions, 10 questions are from the General Aptitude section, testing verbal and numerical ability, and 55 questions are from the Technical section, with specifics related to the paper chosen.

The General Aptitude section will have 5 one-mark questions and 5 two-mark questions, accounting for about 15% of total marks. The Technical section and the Engineering Mathematics section will have a combined total of 25 one-mark questions and 30 two-mark questions, accounting for about 85% of total marks. Further, all the sections may have some Multiple Choice Questions or MCQs, while remaining questions may be Multiple Select Questions or MSQs and/or Numerical Answer Type questions or NATs. The examination awards negative marks for wrong MCQ answers. Usually, 1/3rd of original marks will be deducted for wrong MCQ answers (i.e. -0.33 for wrong one-mark answers and -0.66 for wrong two-mark answers) while there are no negative marks for MSQs and NATs. Also there is no partial credit for MSQs and NATs.

== Result and test score ==
GATE results are usually declared about one month after the examinations are over. The results show the total marks scored by a candidate, the GATE score, the all-India rank (AIR) and the cut off marks for various categories in the candidate's paper. The score is valid for 3 years from the date of announcement of the GATE results. The score cards are issued only to qualified candidates.

=== Normalized GATE Score (new procedure) ===
Calculation of "normalized marks" for subjects held in multiple sessions (CE, CS, EC, EE and ME):

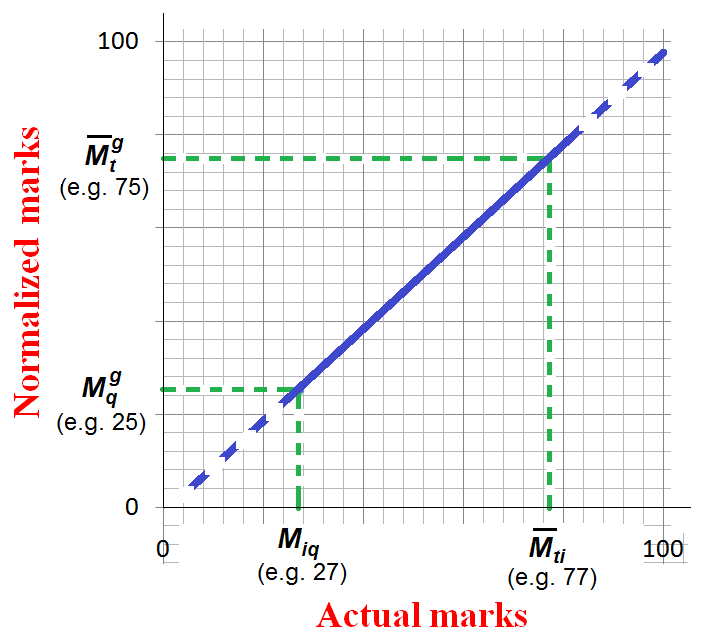
Graph showing the linear relationship between "actual marks" and "normalized marks" of a candidate, in a multiple-session subject (CE, CS, EC, EE and ME) of GATE. M̅^{g}_{t} = average marks of top 0.1 % candidates in all sessions of that subject. M^{g}_{q} = mean + standard deviation, of marks of all candidates in all sessions of that subject. M̅_{ti} = average marks of top 0.1 % candidates in the i^{th} session of that subject. M_{iq} = mean + standard deviation, of marks of all candidates in the i^{th} session of that subject.

From 2014 onward, examination for CE, CS, EC, ME and EE subjects is being held in multiple sessions. Hence, for these subjects, a suitable normalization is applied to take into account any variation in the difficulty levels of the question sets across different sessions. The normalization is done based on the fundamental assumption that "in all multi-session GATE papers, the distribution of abilities of candidates is the same across all the sessions". According to the GATE committee, this assumption is justified since "the number of candidates appearing in multi-session subjects in GATE 2014 is large and the procedure of allocation of session to candidates is random. Further it is also ensured that for the same multi-session subject, the number of candidates allotted in each session is of the same order of magnitude."

Based on the above, and considering various normalization methods, the committee arrived at the following formula for calculating the normalized marks, for CE, CS, EC, EE and ME subjects:

Normalized mark (_{ij}) of j^{th} candidate in i^{th} session, is given by

$\hat{M}_{ij}=\frac{\bar{M}^{g}_{t}-M^{g}_{q}}{M_{ti}-M_{iq}}(M_{ij}-M_{iq})+M^{g}_{q}$
where,

M_{ij} is the actual marks obtained by the j^{th} candidate in the i^{th} session,
M̅^{g}_{t} is the average marks of the top 0.1 % candidates in all sessions of that subject,
M^{g}_{q} is the sum of mean and standard deviation of marks of all candidates in all sessions of that subject,
M̅_{ti} is the average of marks of top 0.1 % candidates in the i^{th} session of that subject,
M_{iq} is the sum of mean and standard deviation of marks of all candidates in the i^{th} session of that subject.

After evaluation of the answers, normalized marks based on the above formula will be calculated using the raw (actual) marks obtained by a candidate in the CE, CS, EC, EE or ME subject. The "score" will be calculated using these normalized marks. For all other subjects (whose tests are conducted in a single session), the actual marks obtained by the candidates will be used in calculating the score.

Calculation of GATE Score for all subjects (single-session and multiple-session):

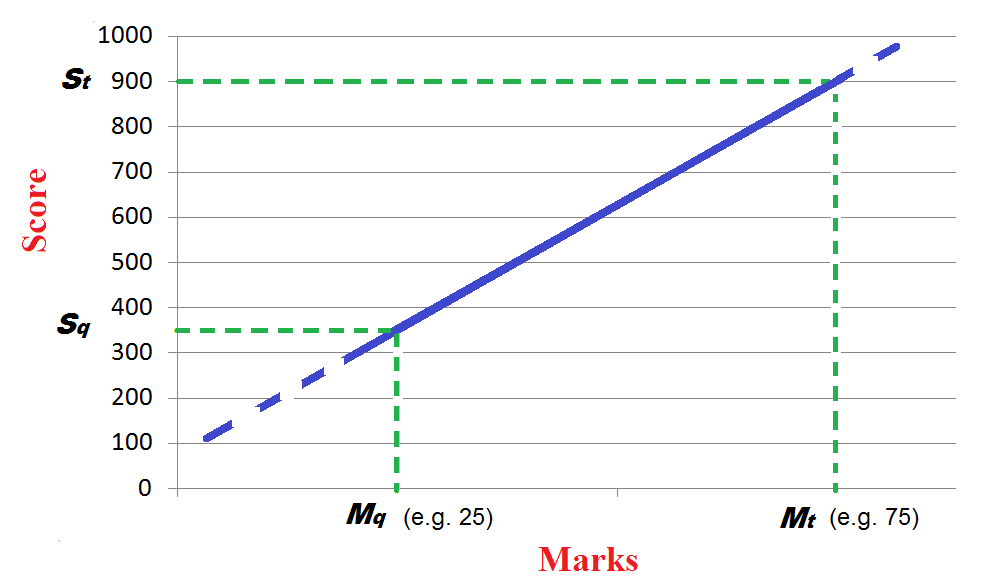
Graph showing the linear relationship between marks and score in GATE. M_{q} = Qualifying marks for general category candidates. M_{t} = Average marks of top 0.1 % candidates (for subjects with 10000 or more appeared candidates) or top 10 candidates (for subjects with less than 10000 appeared candidates). S_{q} = 350. S_{t} = 900. Note: In case of multiple-session subjects (EC, CS, ME, EE and CE), "marks" considered are the "normalized marks".

From GATE 2014 onward (and year 2014-15 of the 2-year validity period of GATE 2013 score), a candidate's GATE score is computed by the following new formula.
$S = S_q + (S_t - S_q) \frac {M - M_q}{\overline{M}_t - M_q}$
where,

S = Score (normalized) of a candidate,
M = Marks obtained by a candidate ("normalized marks" in case of multiple-session subjects CE, CS, EC, EE and ME),
M_{q} = Qualifying marks for general category candidates in that subject (usually 25 or μ + σ, whichever is higher),

μ = Average (i.e. arithmetic mean) of marks of all candidates in that subject,
σ = Standard deviation of marks of all candidates in that subject,

M̅_{t} = Average marks of top 0.1 % candidates (for subjects with 10000 or more appeared candidates) or top 10 candidates (for subjects with less than 10000 appeared candidates),
S_{t} = 900 = Score assigned to M̅_{t},
S_{q} = 350 = Score assigned to M_{q}.

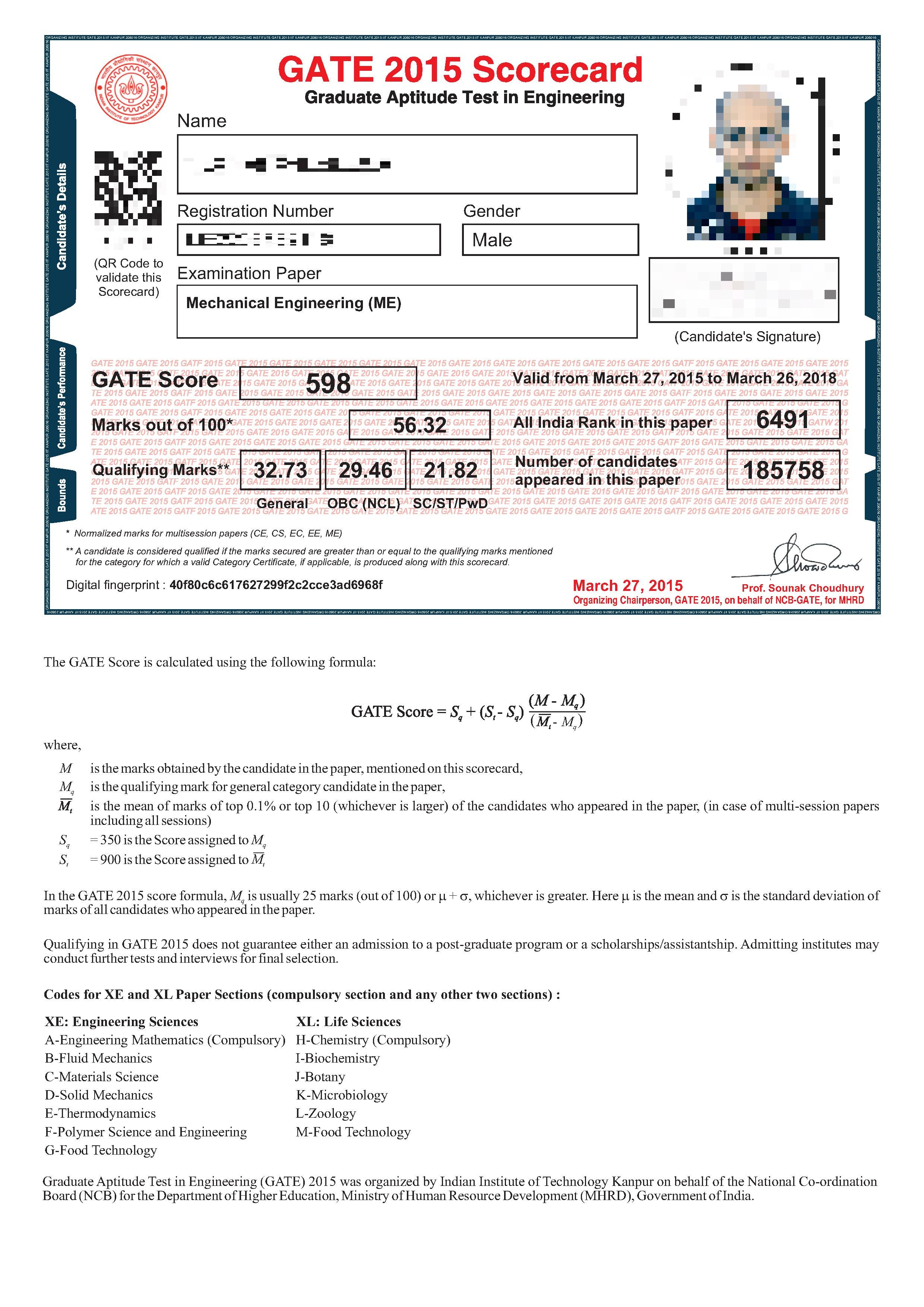
A scorecard in the Mechanical Engineering test of GATE 2015. (The candidate's photograph, signature, name, registration number, and QR code are blurred.)

Percentile:

A candidate's percentile denotes the percentage of candidates scoring lower than that particular candidate. It is calculated as:

Percentile = ( 1 - (All India rank)/( No. of candidates in that subject) ) x 100%

=== Old formula ===
Till GATE 2012 (and year 2013-14 of the 2-year validity period of GATE 2013 score), the score was calculated using the formula:

GATE score = $10 (a_g + s_g\frac{m-a}{S})$

where,

m = Marks obtained by the candidate,
a = Average of marks of all candidates who appeared in that subject, in that year, with marks less than zero converted to zero,
S = Standard deviation of marks of all candidates who appeared in that subject, in that year, with marks less than zero converted to zero,
a_{g} = Global average of marks of all candidates who appeared across all subjects in current and past 5 years (i.e. 2010 to 2013 for GATE 2013), with marks less than zero converted to zero,
s_{g} = Global standard deviation of marks of all candidates who appeared across all subjects in current and past 5 years (i.e. 2010 to 2013 for GATE 2013), with marks less than zero converted to zero.

== Qualifying marks ==
The rules for qualifying marks have varied from year to year. The qualifying marks (out of 100) are different for different subjects as well as categories.

Category	Qualifying mark (out of 100)
General (GN)	25 or 25+, whichever is higher.
Other backward classes (OBC)	90% of general category's qualifying mark.
Scheduled castes (SC) and scheduled tribes (ST)	2/3 (i.e., 66.67%) of general category's qualifying mark.

Here μ is the average (i.e., arithmetic mean) of marks of all candidates in the subject (with negative marks converted to zero) and σ is the standard deviation of all marks in that subject.

Usually, the general category's qualifying mark is in the 25 to 50 range.

The Government of India implemented reservations for other backward classes in college admissions and public sector job recruitment in the year 2008. Before that, all OBC candidates were included in the "general" category. There was no separate OBC category then.

== Statistics ==
Registered
Appeared
Qualified

Year	Registered	Appeared	Qualified	Qualification rate	Reference(s)
2006	184,308	170,252	33,813	19.86%	
2007	168,917	153,822	44,387	28.86%	
2008	184,672	166,027	31,694	19.09%	
2009	230,341	212,130	35,273	16.63%	
2010	460,541	420,596	59,853	14.23%	
2011	612,568	558,480	96,239	17.23%	
2012	777,134	686,614	108,526	15.81%	
2013	1,200,728	984,855	136,699	13.88%	
2014	1,033,625	889,156	149,694	16.84%	
2015	927,580	804,463	121,060 (Note: 13,874 general category candidates who scored above the OBC (NCL) qualifying mark, but below the general category qualifying mark, received scorecards. But they did not qualify)	15.05%	
2016	971,831	818,850	135,392	16.53%	
2017	922,167	787,148	129,149	16.00%	
2018	934,461	781,854	132,245	16.91%	
2019	927,616	770,681	140,955	18.28%	
2020	858,890	685,088	129,000*	18.80%	
2021	882,684	711,542	126,813	17.82%	
2022	845,432	597,030	112,678	18.87%	
2023	670,000*	517,000*	93,000*	18.00*%	
2024	826,239	653,292	129,268	19.78%	
2025	936,019	747,319	141,802	18.97%	
2026	1,011,719	797,434	156,318	19.60%	

^{*} Precise figures unavailable right now.

=== Number of Appeared candidates ===
Electronics and Communication Engineering (EC)
Computer Science and Information Technology (CS)
Mechanical Engineering (ME)
Electrical Engineering (EE)
Civil Engineering (CE)
All other subjects

Year	Electronics and Communication Engineering	Computer Science and Information Technology	Mechanical Engineering	Electrical Engineering	Civil Engineering	Others	Total	Reference(s)
2010	104,291	107,086	59,338	52,246	19,406	About 72,000^{*}	About 415,000^{*}	
2011	137,853	136,027	81,175	72,680	29,347	About 96,000^{*}	About 553,000^{*}	
2012	176,944	156,780	112,320	110,125	36,156	94,289	686,614	
2013	256,135	224,160	165,814	152,381	67,472	118,893	984,855	
2014	216,367	155,190	185,578	141,799	90,872	99,350	889,156	
2015	172,714	115,425	185,758	125,851	101,429	103,286	804,463	
2016	183,152	131,803	234,727	146,293	118,147	4728	818,850	
2017	152,318	108,495	197,789	125,859	119,873	82814	787,148	
2018	125,870	107,893	194,496	121,383	153,078			
2022	54,292	77,257	89,567	69,734	100,043		597,030	
2023	45,833	75,679	63,489	55,292	83,187			
2024	63,092	123,967	65,546	59,599	85,869	255,219	653,292	
2025	81,475	170,825	62,015	67,701	79,951			
2026	95,752	211,020	59,612	65,801	76,385	288,864	797,434	

^{*} Precise figures unavailable right now.

=== Gate Statistics by Years ===
GATE 2012 statistics

The three hour test in 21 papers was conducted in 860 centers and 170 cities/towns across the country on two days: the computer based online exam in six papers on 29 January 2012 and the offline exam in the remaining fifteen papers on 12 February 2012. A total of 7,77,134 candidates registered for GATE 2012 and 6,86,614 candidates appeared for the exam. Nearly 81% of the total number of candidates who appeared for GATE 2012 were from four papers: Electronics and Communication Engineering (1,76,944), Computer Science and Information Technology (1,56,780), Mechanical Engineering (1,12,320) and Electrical Engineering (1,10,125).

Subject-wise distribution of the 686,614 appeared candidates in GATE 2012
1. Electronics and Communication Engineering (EC) (25.8%)
2. Computer Science and Information Technology (CS) (22.8%)
3. Mechanical Engineering (ME) (16.3%)
4. Electrical Engineering (EE) (16.0%)
5. Civil Engineering (CE) (5.27%)
6. Instrumentation engineering (IN) (3.13%)
7. Chemical Engineering (CH) (1.66%)
8. Other (8.96%)
Category-wise distribution of the 108,526 qualified candidates in GATE 2012
1. General category (GN) (50.2%)
2. Other backward classes (OBC) (27.9%)
3. Scheduled castes (SC) and Scheduled tribes (ST) (21.9%)
- Male
- Female

	Male	Female	Total
Registered	NA	NA	777,134
Appeared	501,416	185,198	686,614
Qualified	85,630	22,896	108,526
Percentage of appeared that qualified	17.08%	12.36%	15.81%

Subject	No. of candidates appeared
Electronics and Communication Engineering	176,944
Computer Science and Information Technology	156,780
Mechanical Engineering	112,320
Electrical Engineering	110,125
Civil Engineering	36,156
Instrumentation engineering	21,509
Chemical Engineering	11,407
Others	61,373
Total	686,614

The total number of candidates qualified in GATE 2012 is 1,08,526. This year, 30,294 OBC candidates qualified in the test, while 23,765 SC/ST and 447 physically challenged candidates qualified. Out of 1,85,198 female candidates who appeared in GATE 2012, 22,896 candidates qualified.

The IIT Delhi zone topped among the other zones with 18,927 candidates figuring in the list of qualified candidates, followed by IIT Madras (17,343), IIT Kharagpur (15,735), IISc Bangalore (14,379), IIT Kanpur (12,469), IIT Roorkee (12,328), IIT Bombay (12,287), and IIT Guwahati (5,058).

GATE 2013 statistics
- Male
- Female
- Other

	Male	Female	Other	Total
Registered	723508	477194	26	1200728
Appeared	639326	345510	19	984855
Qualified	108124	28572	3	136699
Percentage of appeared that qualified	16.91%	8.27%	15.79%	13.88%

- General category (GN)
- Other backward classes (OBC)
- Scheduled castes (SC)
- Scheduled tribes (ST)

	General category (GN)	Other backward classes (OBC)	Scheduled castes (SC)	Scheduled tribes (ST)	Total
Registered	618265	412191	137137	33135	1200728
Appeared	496284	347617	113163	27758	984855
Qualified	72125	41237	18936	4401	136699
Percentage of appeared that qualified	14.53%	11.86%	16.73%	15.85%	13.88%

A total of 1,200,728 candidates registered for GATE 2013 and 984,855 candidates (82.02%) appeared for the exam, of which 136,699 (13.88%) qualified in GATE 2013.

The three-hour test was conducted on two days over four sessions in total. The computer based online exam for 2,02,223 candidates in fifteen papers was conducted in 572 centers spread over 123 cities and towns across the country on 20 January 2013. The offline exam for 9,98,505 candidates in the remaining six papers was conducted in 992 centers spread over 183 cities and towns across the country on 10 February 2013.

A larger fraction of the registered men appeared (88%) for the exam than women candidates (72%). Nearly 81% of the total number of candidates who appeared for GATE 2013 were from four papers: Electronics and Communication Engineering (2,56,135), Computer Science and Information Technology (2,24,160), Mechanical Engineering (1,65,814) and Electrical Engineering (1,52,381).

Women formed 20.9% of the qualified candidates. Per the candidate supplied category (General, OBC-NC, SC, and ST) information, among the qualified candidates, 72,125 belong to General, 41,237 to OBC-NC, 18,936 to SC, and 4,401 to ST category. 1,136 were physically challenged.

The top five States that had qualified candidates as their permanent residence were Andhra Pradesh (22,476), Uttar Pradesh (22,400), Maharashtra (9,951), Bihar (9,820), and Kerala (8,992).

The city of New Delhi has the maximum number of qualified candidates who had mentioned it as their correspondence address. "Correspondence address City" has a slightly different bearing compared to the "Permanent State". While the Permanent Residence State often relates to the "Native" State or State where their Parents/Guardians live, the Correspondence City is mostly related to the current residence, which is more likely to be the place of study or employment.

Subject-wise distribution of the 984,855 appeared candidates in GATE 2013
1. Electronics and Communication Engineering (EC) (26.0%)
2. Computer Science and Information Technology (CS) (22.8%)
3. Mechanical Engineering (ME) (16.8%)
4. Electrical Engineering (EE) (15.5%)
5. Civil Engineering (CE) (6.90%)
6. Instrumentation Engineering (IN) (2.90%)
7. Biotechnology (BT) (1.60%)
8. Chemical Engineering (CH) (1.50%)
9. Life Sciences (XL) (1.30%)
10. Chemistry (CY) (1.20%)
11. Other (3.50%)

Subject	Appeared	Qualified	Percentage of appeared that qualified
Electronics and Communication Engineering (EC)	256135	36394	14.21%
Computer Science and Information Technology (CS)	224160	17440	7.78%
Mechanical Engineering (ME)	165814	24573	14.82%
Electrical Engineering (EE)	152381	25342	16.63%
Civil Engineering (CE)	67472	11920	17.67%
Instrumentation Engineering (IN)	28249	3376	11.95%
Biotechnology (BT)	16159	3424	21.19%
Chemical Engineering (CH)	14835	2887	19.46%
Life Sciences (XL)	12920	2675	20.70%
Chemistry (CY)	11768	2362	20.07%
Physics (PH)	7497	1000	13.34%
Mathematics (MA)	4963	800	16.12%
Aerospace Engineering (AE)	4523	843	18.64%
Production and Industrial Engineering (PI)	3871	679	17.54%
Geology and Geophysics (GG)	2765	629	22.75%
Architecture and Planning (AR)	2718	580	21.34%
Metallurgical Engineering (MT)	2663	635	23.85%
Engineering Sciences (XE)	2476	501	20.23%
Others (4 subjects)	3486	639	18.33%
Total (22 subjects)	984855	136699	13.88 %

Permanent state-wise distribution of the 136,699 qualified candidates in GATE 2013
1. Andhra Pradesh (includes Telangana) (16.4%)
2. Uttar Pradesh (16.4%)
3. Maharashtra (7.30%)
4. Bihar (7.20%)
5. Kerala (6.60%)
6. West Bengal (5.80%)
7. Rajasthan (5.70%)
8. Madhya Pradesh (5.60%)
9. Tamil Nadu (3.60%)
10. Haryana (3.30%)
11. Other (22.1%)

Permanent state-wise distribution of the 136,699 qualified candidates in GATE 2013
Permanent state	Number of candidates qualifying
Andhra Pradesh (includes Telangana)	22,476
Uttar Pradesh	22,400
Maharashtra	9,951
Bihar	9,820
Kerala	8,992
West Bengal	7,967
Rajasthan	7,753
Madhya Pradesh	7,644
Tamil Nadu	4,985
Haryana	4,546
Delhi	4,393
Odisha	3,960
Karnataka	3,780
Jharkhand	3,409
Chhattisgarh	3,288
Gujarat	3,064
Uttarakhand	2,363
Punjab	2,054
Assam	1,308
Himachal Pradesh	735
Jammu and Kashmir	558
Chandigarh	329
Tripura	221
Others (12 states)	703

GATE 2014 statistics

A total of 1,033,625 candidates registered, of which 889,156 candidates (86.02%) appeared for the exam. Out of the total candidates registered, 30.17% were female candidates while the rest were male candidates and others.

Subject-wise distribution of the 889,156 appeared candidates in GATE 2014
1. Electronics and Communication Engineering (24.3%)
2. Mechanical Engineering (20.9%)
3. Computer Science and Information Technology (17.4%)
4. Electrical Engineering (15.9%)
5. Civil Engineering (10.2%)
6. Instrumentation Engineering (2.52%)
7. Chemical Engineering (1.78%)
8. Biotechnology (1.21%)
9. Life Sciences (0.96%)
10. Chemistry (0.89%)
11. Other (3.82%)
Category-wise distribution of the 149,694 qualified candidates in GATE 2014
1. General (56.8%)
2. Scheduled castes (11.4%)
3. Scheduled tribes (2.82%)
4. Other backwards classes (non-creamy layer) (28.2%)
5. Persons with disabilities (0.69%)
- Male and other
- Female

Out of the registered candidates, 86% of the Male and 85% of the Female registrants appeared for the examination. In terms of the number of candidates, the five largest papers were: Electronics and Communication Engineering (2,16,367), Mechanical Engineering (1,85,578), Computer Science and Information Technology (1,55,190), Electrical Engineering (1,41,799) and Civil Engineering (90,872). Examination for all these papers was conducted in multi-session mode. A suitable normalization method was followed for these papers.

	Male and other	Female	Total
Registered	About 722,000	About 312,000	1,033,625
Appeared	About 623,000	About 266,000	889,156
Qualified	118,263	31,431	149,694
Percentage of appeared that qualified	About 19%	About 12%	16.84%

In GATE 2014, based on the qualified marks criterion, 149,694 (16.84%) candidates qualified (i.e., received scorecards). In terms of the category as declared by the candidates [General, OBC (non-creamy layer), SC, ST and PwD], 85,063 General, 42,287 OBC (non-creamy layer), 17,085 SC, 4,224 ST and 1,035 PwD candidates qualified. The number of female qualified candidates was 31,431 (21% of the total).

Subject code	Subject	No. of candidates appeared	Qualifying marks		
Subject code	Subject	No. of candidates appeared	General category	Other Backward Classes (Non-creamy layer)	Scheduled Castes / Scheduled Tribes / Persons with disabilities
AE	Aerospace Engineering	4559	25.00	22.50	16.67
AG	Agricultural Engineering	1168	25.00	22.50	16.67
AR	Architecture and Planning	3087	32.50	29.25	21.67
BT	Biotechnology	10719	25.84	23.26	17.23
CE	Civil Engineering	90872	26.57	23.91	17.71
CH	Chemical Engineering	15844	35.14	31.62	23.43
CS	Computer Science and Information Technology	155190	25.00	22.50	16.67
CY	Chemistry	7932	29.87	26.88	19.91
EC	Electronics and Communication Engineering	216367	25.56	23.01	17.04
EE	Electrical Engineering	141799	25.00	22.50	16.67
EY	Ecology and Evolution	652	42.89	38.60	28.59
GG	Geology and Geophysics	2659	36.33	32.70	24.22
IN	Instrumentation Engineering	22367	25.00	22.50	16.67
MA	Mathematics	3840	25.00	22.50	16.67
ME	Mechanical Engineering	185578	28.86	25.97	19.24
MN	Mining Engineering	1140	33.67	30.30	22.44
MT	Metallurgical Engineering	3586	49.87	44.88	33.25
PH	Physics	6132	31.72	28.55	21.15
PI	Production and Industrial Engineering	3316	25.00	22.50	16.67
TF	Textile Engineering and Fibre Science	1290	25.71	23.14	17.14
XE	Engineering Sciences	2532	29.18	26.26	19.45
XL	Life Sciences	8527	31.04	27.93	20.69
-	Total	889156	-	-	-

GATE 2015 statistics
Subject-wise distribution of the 804,463 appeared candidates in GATE 2015
1. Electronics and Communication Engineering (21.5%)
2. Mechanical Engineering (23.1%)
3. Computer Science and Information Technology (14.3%)
4. Electrical Engineering (15.6%)
5. Civil Engineering (12.6%)
6. Other (12.8%)
Gender-wise distribution of the 804,463 appeared candidates in GATE 2015
1. Male (70.5%)
2. Female (29.5%)
3. Other (0.01%)
Category-wise distribution of the 121,060 qualified candidates in GATE 2015
1. General Category (50.8%)
2. Other Backward Classes (Non-creamy layer) (32.7%)
3. Scheduled castes (13.1%)
4. Scheduled tribes (3.48%)

A total of 927,580 candidates had registered for GATE 2015 and 804,463 candidates have appeared for the examination. Out of the total registered candidates, 567,111 of the Male and 237,235 of the Female registrants appeared for the examination. In terms of the number of candidates appeared, the five largest papers are: Electronics and Communication Engineering (172,714), Mechanical Engineering (185,758), Computer Science and Information Technology (115,425), Electrical Engineering (125,851) and Civil Engineering (101,429).

	Male	Female	Other	Total
Registered				927,580
Appeared	567,111	237,235	117	804,463
Received scorecard		24,545		134,934

The examination for all the 22 papers was conducted in 8 sessions spread over 2 weekends, starting from 31 January 2015 and ending on 8 February 2015. The examination was conducted in over 680 centers spread over 26 states and union territories of the country.

In GATE 2015, based on the qualified marks criterion, 121,060 (15.05%) candidates qualified. There were 13,874 General Category candidates who scored above the OBC category cut off marks but below the General Category cut off marks. Those candidates, although not qualified in General Category, have been issued score cards. They will be considered qualified in OBC category in case their category status changes to OBC at a later stage. Qualified candidates included 947 physically challenged candidates. The number of female candidates receiving the scorecards is 24,545 (18.19% of the total of 134,934).

Category	No. of qualified candidates	Percentage of total
General category	61,450	50.76%
Other Backward Classes (Non-creamy layer)	39,538	32.66%
Scheduled castes	15,861	13.10%
Scheduled Tribes	4,211	3.48%
Total	121,060	100%

== Admission to post-graduate programs ==
Unlike undergraduate admissions in India, candidates must apply individually to each institute after the institute has published its M.Tech. notification (usually in the month of March). There is no separate counselling held. For admissions in NITs and IIITs, CCMT is held every year and the notification is released around April of each year.

Some institutions specify GATE qualification as mandatory even for admission of self-financing students to postgraduate programs. GATE qualified candidates are also eligible for the award of Junior Research Fellowship in CSIR Laboratories and CSIR sponsored projects. Top rank holders in some GATE papers are entitled to apply for "Shyama Prasad Mukherjee Fellowship" awarded by CSIR. Some government organizations prescribe GATE qualification as a requirement for applying to the post of a Scientist/Engineer.

Most Indian institutes do not specify cut-off marks for previous years. But in the recent years IIT Kharagpur and IIT Guwahati have been specifying last year cut-off mark list. Typically the Indian Institute of Science and Indian Institutes of Technology are the most selective followed by BITS Pilani, National Institutes of Technology and others. Even within the top institutes, the selection criteria varies widely across departments and programs depending on expertise areas.

=== Financial assistance in post-graduate programs ===
The GATE is used as a requirement for financial assistance (e.g. scholarships) for a number of programs, though criteria differ by admitting institution. In December 2015, the University Grants Commission and MHRD announced that the scholarship for GATE-qualified master's degree students is increased by 56% from ₹8,000 (US$83) per month to ₹12,400 (US$130) per month.

=== Admission to foreign universities ===
In recent years, various academics have recognized GATE as being one of the toughest exams in its category. Some non-Indian universities like the National University of Singapore, Nanyang Technological University in Singapore, the TU9 and some technical universities in Germany also identify GATE score as a parameter for judging the quality of the candidates for admission into their Masters and Ph.D. programs.

=== CSIR's JRF - GATE fellowship ===
The Council of Scientific and Industrial Research (CSIR) introduced the Junior Research Fellowship (JRF) - GATE scheme in 2002 to allow GATE-qualified engineering graduates and GPAT-qualified pharmaceutical graduates to pursue research through suitable Ph.D. programs at CSIR laboratories.

Stipend and tenure:

The fellowship amount is ₹31,000 (US$320) per month plus HRA (house rent allowance). In addition, contingency grant of ₹20,000 (US$210) per annum (calculated on pro-rata basis for fraction of a year) is also provided. On completion of 2 years as JRF - GATE, the fellowship may be upgraded to SRF (Senior Research Fellowship) - GATE and stipend may be increased to ₹35,000 (US$360) per month in the subsequent years, on the basis of assessment of CSIR JRF-NET guidelines.

The total duration of the fellowship is 5 years, within which the candidate is expected to complete the Ph.D. degree.

== Recruitment ==
Public sector undertakings (PSUs) in India, for long, have had troubles conducting their recruitment processes with more than 100,000 students taking the exams for less than 1000 jobs (a selection rate of less than 1%). After sensing the exponential rise in the number of engineering graduates in India who wish to get a PSU job, the PSUs have decided that a GATE score shall be the primary criteria for initial shortlisting. This change was the primary cause for the rapid increase in applicants for GATE 2012.

Indian Oil Corporation was the first PSU which successfully tested out this system and was followed two years later by National Thermal Power Corporation, Bharat Heavy Electricals, Bharat Electronics & PowerGrid Corporation of India.

Usually these companies release their recruitment notifications right after GATE notification, indicating that candidates have to take GATE to be considered for a job in their organizations.

=== List of PSUs in 2026-27 cycle recruiting via GATE ===
Organization	Abbreviation	Primary Work	GATE Entry Post	Annual CTC	Group
Airports Authority of India	AAI	Airports & air navigation	Junior Executive (Engineering)	~₹13.00 lakh	Group B
Damodar Valley Corporation	DVC	Power generation & transmission	Executive Trainee	~₹15.00 lakh	Group A
Engineers India Limited	EIL	Engineering consultancy & EPC	Management Trainee / Engineer	~₹18.00 lakh	Group A
GAIL	GAIL	Natural gas & energy	Executive Trainee	~₹15.00 lakh	Group A
Grid Controller of India Limited	POSOCO	Manage the National Grid	Executive Trainee	~₹19.00 lakh	Group A
National Aluminium Company	NALCO	Aluminium mining & production	Graduate Engineer Trainee	~₹12.00 lakh	Group A
National Highways Authority of India	NHAI	National highways	Deputy Manager (Technical)	~₹15.00 lakh	Group A
National Hydroelectric Power Corporation Limited	NHPC	Hydroelectric & renewable power	Trainee Engineer	~₹17.00 lakh	Group A
National Thermal Power Corporation	NTPC	Power generation	Executive Trainee	~₹22.00 lakh	Group A
North Eastern Electric Power Corporation Limited	NEEPCO	Power generation	Executive Trainee	~₹15.00 lakh	Group A
Nuclear Power Corporation of India	NPCIL	Nuclear power generation	Executive Trainee	~₹13.00 lakh	Group A
Power Grid Corporation of India	PGCIL	Power transmission & grid	Engineer Trainee	~₹21.00 lakh	Group A
RITES Limited	RITES	Transport & infrastructure consultancy	Graduate Engineer Trainee	~₹10.00 lakh	Group B

Many government agencies also recruit through the GATE examination, including DRDO, ISRO, BARC, and others, for Group A, Gazetted Officer positions in the Government of India. DRDO previously recruited through UPSC, but later shifted to recruitment through GATE, as GATE focuses more deeply on specialised engineering and technical knowledge, whereas UPSC generally assesses more generalised engineering concepts. This demonstrates the significant importance and technical rigour of the GATE examination, which can be considered equivalently important and, in terms of technical depth, even more challenging than UPSC.

=== List of Government Agencies recruit via GATE ===
Organization	Abbreviation	Primary Work	GATE Entry Post	Annual CTC	Group
Bhabha Atomic Research Centre	BARC	Nuclear research & technology	Scientific Officer 'C'	~₹16.10 lakh	Group A
Bureau of Indian Standards	BIS	Product quality, safety, and reliability	Scientist 'B'	~₹13.80 lakh	Group A
Cabinet Secretariat	CabSec	Strategic intelligence & national security	Deputy Field Officer	~₹11.90 lakh	Group B
Cabinet Secretariat	CabSec	Strategic intelligence & national security	Senior Field Officer	~₹15.60 lakh	Group A
Defence Research and Development Organisation	DRDO	Defence research & technology	Scientist 'B'	~₹14.20 lakh	Group A
Indian Air Force	IAF	Technical Cadre	Flying officer	~₹17.60 lakh	Group A
Indian Computer Emergency Response Team	CERT-In	Cyber Security Threats	Scientist 'B'	~₹14.20 lakh	Group A
Intelligence Bureau	IB	Internal intelligence & national security	Assistant Central Intelligence Officer (ACIO-II)	~₹11.90 lakh	Group B
Indian Space Research Organisation	ISRO	Space research & technology	Scientist/Engineer 'SC'	~₹14.20 lakh	Group A
National Informatics Centre	NIC	Government IT & e-governance	Scientist 'B'	~₹14.20 lakh	Group A
National Technical Research Organisation	NTRO	Technical intelligence & national security	Scientist 'B'	~₹15.60 lakh	Group A

== Changes in recent years ==
Year	Changes	Reference(s)
2009	The Information Technology and Computer Science tests were merged into a single Computer Science and Information Technology test (code "CS").; The GATE score was valid only for one year but later the GATE committee made it valid for two years in 2010.	
2010	Pharmacy was no longer a GATE subject, with the Graduate Pharmacy Aptitude Test (conducted by the All India Council for Technical Education) as the replacement.; The Biotechnology section of the Engineering Sciences GATE paper had been removed and a separate Biotechnology test (code "BT") was started.; An additional section of General Aptitude was introduced in GATE. Ten questions carrying 15 marks make up this section of the GATE Exam.	
2011	Based on a trouble-free pilot project in 2010, four of the GATE papers in GATE 2011 were run using computer-based online mode. The four online papers for 2011 were Aerospace Engineering (code "AE"), Geology and Geophysics (code "GG"), Mining Engineering (code "MN") and Textile Engineering and Fiber Science (code "TF").; GATE was held in the morning (9:00 to 12:00) session for some papers and afternoon (14:00 to 17:00) session for others. Also, the computer-based tests were held on a different date.	
2012	Only final year students and passed-out candidates were declared eligible to take GATE. Pre-final year B.E./B.Tech. students, who were eligible till 2011, were no longer eligible.; The application process was made completely online. Candidates could view their responses to the ORS and also GATE Office released official solutions for GATE papers.; The admit card was made downloadable from the application website. Sending admit cards by post was discontinued.; The exam mode was changed from paper-based to "online" (i.e. computer-based) for 2 additional subjects: Agricultural Engineering (code "AG") and Architecture and Planning (code "AR").; The use of pencils to darken the bubbles in the answer sheet was discontinued. Candidates could use only black ink ballpoint pens for darkening of the bubbles in the answer sheet.	
2013	Female candidates were exempted from paying the application fee.; Candidates were required to upload a scanned copy of photograph and signature. Print-out of the completed application form was to be mailed to the institute by post.; The application fee was increased from ₹ 1000 to ₹ 1200.; The GATE score formula was changed. Scores calculated using the old formula were effective during the year 2013–14. Scores calculated using the new formula were effective during the year 2014–15.	
2014	A new subject of Ecology and Evolution (code "EY") was introduced.; Examinations for all 22 subjects were conducted by an online Computer-Based Test (CBT). The online examination contained some questions for which numerical answers must be keyed in by the candidate using the "virtual" (i.e. on-screen) keypad. The rest of the questions were of Multiple Choice Question (MCQ) type.; Female candidates were required to pay some fee for application, a change introduced due to many raising complaints about a large portion of female candidates who registered but did not appear for the exam in 2013.; Application fee was increased from ₹ 1200 to ₹ 1500 for general category, OBC male/other candidates, and ₹ 750 for all female candidates and SC, ST male/other candidates.; GATE score's validity is increased from 2 years to 3 years.; Examinations were held during forenoon and afternoon sessions on alternate weekends (Saturday and Sunday) between 1 February 2014 and 2 March 2014. Examination for the subjects ME, EE, EC, and CS was held in multiple sessions due to the large numbers of registered candidates.	
2015	The entire application process is made online. All required documents have to be scanned and uploaded on the online application system. Candidates no longer have to send anything by post.; Printed (i.e. hard-copy) scorecards are no longer sent to candidates. Only a digital (i.e. soft-copy) scorecard can be downloaded by qualified candidates from the official GATE website.	
2016	Candidates are not permitted to bring their own calculators. An online virtual (i.e. on-screen) calculator will be available during the examination.; The syllabus has been revised for some subjects.; A new subject of Petroleum Engineering (code "PE") has been introduced.; After completion of all test sessions, an Answer Key will be provided for candidates to check. Candidates can challenge the GATE 2016 Answer Key on a nominal fee for a specified time period.	
2017	A New Section has been introduced in the Engineering Sciences (XE) Paper. This section is the Atmospheric and Oceanic Sciences (section H).; International students from countries namely Bangladesh, Nepal, Sri Lanka, Ethiopia and United Arab Emirates are now eligible to apply for GATE 2017.	
2018	While choosing the exam centers for GATE 2018, the candidates will have to select their first two choices from the same GATE zone. The third choice can be from any other GATE zone.; Candidates are not required to upload the scanned image of their thumb impression while filling the GATE online application.; GATE will be held across 200 cities in India.; GATE 2018 will also be held in the following international cities- Addis Ababa, Colombo, Dhaka, Kathmandu, Dubai, and Singapore.	
2019	GATE 2019 introduces a new paper "Statistics" with a code of "ST".; Candidates who fail to apply by 21 September 2018 can still apply till 1 October 2018 by paying a late fee of ₹ 500. The late fee in the case of foreign centers is US$20.	
2020	GATE 2020 introduces a new paper "Biomedical Engineering" with a code of "BM".	
2021	Two new subjects - Environmental Science and Engineering (ES) and Humanities and Social Science (XS) have also been added to the GATE exam 2021.; There was a relaxation in minimum eligibility for applying to GATE 2021 due to the COVID-19 situation. As per the announcement, candidates in their third year of undergraduate degree would be eligible for GATE 2021.	
2022	Two new subjects - Geomatics Engineering (GE) and Naval Architecture and Marine Engineering (NM) were added to the GATE exam 2022.	
2024	GATE 2024 introduced a new paper Data Science and Artificial Intelligence (DA).	
2027	GATE 2027 introduced new paper Robotics & Automation and shifted Textile Engineering & Fiber Science as option under XE while also renumbering the optional subjects under XE / XL / XH.; New application now require a fresh/existed and updated DigiLocker id.	

== Year and Organizing Institute ==
Each year's GATE is organized by any one of 8 institutes: IISc and 7 IITs. The overall coordination and responsibility of conducting GATE lies with this institute, which is designated as the Organizing Institute (OI) for GATE of that year. GATE coaching institutes often make speculations regarding the topics to focus upon depending upon the institute that is the OI of that year.

Institute	GATE editions organized
Indian Institute of Science	1984, 1990, 1996, 2002, 2008, 2016, 2024.
Indian Institute of Technology, Madras	1983, 1985, 1991, 1997, 2003, 2011, 2019, 2027.
Indian Institute of Technology, Delhi	1986, 1992, 1998, 2004, 2012, 2020, 2028.
Indian Institute of Technology, Bombay	1987, 1993, 1999, 2005, 2013, 2021, 2029.
Indian Institute of Technology, Kharagpur	1988, 1994, 2000, 2006, 2014, 2022, 2030.
Indian Institute of Technology, Kanpur	1989, 1995, 2001, 2007, 2015, 2023.
Indian Institute of Technology, Roorkee	2009, 2017, 2025.
Indian Institute of Technology, Guwahati	2010, 2018, 2026.

== See also ==
=== Examinations ===
- Engineering Services Examination (ESE)
- Civil Services Examination (CSE)
- Graduate Record Examination (GRE)
- Graduate Management Admission Test (GMAT)
- Common Admission Test (CAT)
- Test of English as a Foreign Language (TOEFL)
- International English Language Testing System (IELTS)

=== Institutes ===
- Indian Institute of Science
- Indian Institutes of Technology
- National Institutes of Technology
- National Institute of Information Technology
- Indian Institutes of Information Technology
- International Institutes of Information Technology
- Indian Institutes of Science Education and Research
- Indian Institute of Engineering Science and Technology
- Indian Institute of Space Science and Technology
- Indian Institute of Astrophysics
