= Samir K. Brahmachari =

Indian biophysicist

- Born: 1 January 1952 (age 74); Calcutta
- Education: University of Calcutta
- Known for: Open Source Drug Discovery for Affordable Healthcare
- Awards: See Recognition and Awards section
- Scientific career
- Fields: Functional Genomics;Structural & Computational Biology
- Workplaces: CSIR India; CSIR-IGIB
- Website: samirbrahmachari.rnabiology.org

Samir Kumar Brahmachari (born 1 January 1952) is an Indian biophysicist and Former Director General of the Council of Scientific & Industrial Research (CSIR) and Former Secretary, Department of Scientific and Industrial Research (DSIR), Government of India. He is the Founder Director of Institute of Genomics and Integrative Biology (IGIB), New Delhi and the Chief Mentor of Open Source for Drug Discovery (OSDD) Project. He is the recipient of J.C Bose Fellowship Award, DST (2012). In addition, he is one of the featured researchers in the India Cancer Research Database developed by Institute of Bioinformatics (IOB), Bangalore with support from the Department of Biotechnology, Government of India.

== Education and academic career ==
Brahmachari gained a B.Sc. degree in chemistry from the University of Calcutta in 1972, followed by an M.Sc. (pure chemistry) in 1974. In 1978 he earned a PhD in molecular biophysics from the Indian Institute of Science in Bangalore. He followed this with post-doctoral research at Paris Diderot University and a position as a visiting scientist at the Memorial University of Newfoundland.

He started his academic career as PhD scholar at the Molecular Biophysics Unit in Indian Institute of Science, and in 1981 became a Lecturer. In 1986 he became an assistant professor and Associate Professor in 1992. In 1997 he became a professor and simultaneously served as postdoctoral researcher at the Max Planck Institute for Biophysical Chemistry. On 11 August 1997 he was appointed as the Director of CSIR-Center for Biochemical Technology (CBT). As the Director of CBT, he was instrumental in re-establishing it as the CSIR-Institute of Genomics and Integrative Biology- an institute where genomics and informatics have been seamlessly integrated. He assumed responsibility as the Director General of Council of Scientific and Industrial Research, India on 12 November 2006.

He has held the membership of the Human Genome Organisation (HUGO) Council (2004–2011). He is currently on the advisory board of the X Prize in Genomics and the scientific advisory board of National Center of Biomedical Ontology (NCBO), Stanford University. He has also been serving as the adjunct professor, Bioinformatics Centre, University of Pune, since 2003 and holds the Joseph Austin McCartney & Ruth McCartney Hauck named Visiting Professorship, Mayo Clinic, Rochester, US, since 2012. He also holds honorary lifetime professorship to the University of Delhi. He is also the academy professor of AcSIR (Academy of Scientific and Innovative Research ).

== Research ==
Brahmachari’s primary research involves elucidating the role of repetitive DNA in genome function in health and disease using a trans-disciplinary approach, integrating structural biology with genomics, molecular biology and information science.

He has more than 12 patents, 23 copyrights and over 150 research publications to his credit.

== Current focus ==
His current focus is on leveraging the angle of personalised medicine towards pharmacogenomics with focus on affordable healthcare. He conceptualized and led the Indian Genome Variation Consortium Project to provide the first comprehensive genetic map of the extremely diverse Indian population and identify predictive markers for complex diseases and pharmacogenomics studies. He has also conceptualized the Ayurgenomics project that aims to integrate the principles of personalized medicine from Ayurveda, an ancient Indian medical system with modern genomics to bridge the gap from genotype to phenotype. Brahmachari is the Chief Mentor of CSIR-Open Source Drug Discovery (OSDD) project, a CSIR-led Team India Consortium with global partnership. Emerging as India’s first crowd sourcing initiative, OSDD is today a global translational research platform with more than 7500 participants from 130 countries. Brahmachari is the Chairman of Scientific Advisory Board of Genotypic, India's first Genomics company.

== Recognition and awards ==
Brahmachari has been the member of the HUGO Council (2004-2011). He also co-chaired the 13th Human Genome Organization meet with Edison Liu, HUGO president. The meet was held at Hyderabad International Convention Centre, Hyderabad, India.

He was conferred the Banga Bibhushan Title, the highest state civilian award by the Government of West Bengal in recognition of his outstanding contributions to the field of Life Sciences in 2013.

He has been selected as one of the Fierce's Top 10 Biotech Techies for his outstanding contribution to the field of genomics and open source drug discovery. Science has hailed him as "Open-source guru" (2012) considering his exceptional contribution in conceptualizing and mentoring India’s first crowd sourcing initiative – Open Source Drug Discovery.

Brahmachari received the Life Time Achievement award in Genomics (2018) at the Genomics India Conference, Bengaluru.

== Controversies ==
Brahmachari was alleged to have taken part in behind the scenes lobbying to ensure an extension of his position as the CSIR Director. Another controversy involved allegations that he fostered cronyism at the expense of meritocracy at CSIR. Shiva Ayyadurai, an expatriate scientist reported that "Our interaction with CSIR scientists revealed that they work in a medieval, feudal environment."

His claims regarding the first mapping of the Mycobaterium tuberculosis bacterial genome and the identification of a potential anti-tuberculosis drug candidate from the OSDD project invited severe criticism for being inaccurate and misguiding. The Nature article had been corrected multiple times, in an unprecedented fashion due to factual inaccuracies in the reporting by the correspondent
