= Open Source Drug Discovery =

Indian-based drug consortium

Open Source Drug Discovery (OSDD) is a Council of Scientific and Industrial Research, India (CSIR)-led Team India Consortium with global participation offering a collaborative drug discovery platform for neglected tropical diseases like leishmaniasis, which draw limited attention of research-based pharmaceutical enterprises. This program has a global community with over 7500 participants from 130 countries comprising researchers, academia, students, industries, educational institutions and so on. Anyone who is committed to the discovery of drugs for neglected diseases in an open source mode can participate in the program. OSDD functions by bringing together experts from diverse backgrounds to focus on discovering and developing affordable drugs for tropical infections.

== History ==
CSIR-OSDD was launched in September 2008. This project was conceived by Samir K. Brahmachari, the Founder Director of the CSIR-Institute of Genomics and Integrative Biology as an 11th Five year plan project of CSIR. This was approved by the Government of India with an overall outlay of Rs 45.96 crores (about $12 million). The project motto is "Affordable healthcare for all" and makes use of open source philosophy, crowd –sourcing concepts and a collaborative research model, capitalizing on web based tools to fuel innovation and discover novel therapies. All the data and resources generated by the community are openly shared through a web based portal called Sysborg 2.0 specifically designed for this purpose

The project has a healthcare model that blends together the policies of patenting and open source research, aiming to make novel drugs available as generic drugs, without Intellectual Property restrictions, and thus ensure affordability and accessibility.

The first action involved development of drugs for tuberculosis (TB) bacillus (Mycobacterium tuberculosis). The project has two phases:

1. Phase I (2008–2012) which will involve discovery and development of new drugs.
2. Phase II (2012–2017) which will involve clinical trials.

== Process ==
OSDD started with the set up of a web portal, which is based on the Wiki model of website so that participating agencies can easily contribute to or modify the content of the website. The information uploaded can be then peer-reviewed. New drugs being developed will be in public domain. The generic drugs will be taken up by pharmaceutical companies so that the drug will be commercialised at reasonable price.

=== Operational methodology ===
The process of drug discovery is divided into ten work packages, namely

1. WP1 - Drug target identification. This promotes computational activities including Systems Biology research for identification of potential drug targets. It opens participation of academia, institutions and industries with strong inclination towards open source.
2. WP2 - Expression of targets. This involves sharing experimental results on potential drug targets and development of assays.
3. WP3 - Screen development. This involves the use of specific assays developed for different targets to screen large chemical compound libraries.
4. WP4 - In silico docking. This involves determining the target and identification of potential sites on the hit compounds for synthesis of analogs, so that maximum potency and minimum toxicity are achieved.
5. WP5 - Micro array gene expression for human cells and tissues with the best inhibitors. This involves identification of compounds with higher binding affinity for the target without altering expression profile of host cell.
6. WP6 - Medicinal chemistry. This includes synthesis of improved compounds.
7. WP7 - Lead optimization. This is to produce lead compounds with desirable effects while unaffecting the host.
8. WP8 - Proteomics based lead affinity column to check for human cellular protein binding
9. WP9 - Pre-clinical toxicity of the lead compounds
10. WP10 - Clinical development of new molecular entities

Work packages 1–8 are within Phase I, while WP9 and 10 are within Phase II.

== Organisation ==
OSDD is a collaborative project and a unit of CSIR Samir K. Brahmachari, Former Director General of CSIR is the "Chief Mentor" of the Open Source Drug Discovery Project. M. Vijayan, President of the Gyan Bindu Academy , V. M. Katoch, Director General of the Indian Council of Medical Research (ICMR), and N.K. Ganguli, former Director General of ICMR, are the Mentors. Individual projects are taken up by participating bodies and are managed by a Principal Investigator. These projects are centrally supervised by the OSDD project director Sarala Balachandran at CSIR.

== Funding ==
The core funding of OSDD is from the Government of India. For the period of September 2008 to March 2012, the Government of India had earmarked Rs 45.96 crores (about $12 million) for the project. The funds are used for funding the scientific projects, setting up infrastructure, and supporting ongoing activities of the project. Up to 2012, OSDD was a project under 'National Laboratories Scheme' of CSIR. For the 12th five-year plan during 2013-2017, the planning commission has approved the continuation of OSDD as a part of Scheme for Open Innovation of CSIR.

== Achievements ==
OSDD is joined by 7,500 registered participants from different parts of the world. There are about 110 research projects being carried out. The collaborative work has identified more than 60 potential drug targets of M. tuberculosis. There are seven targets that are being examined. The first international publication of the consortium was in 2009 on the integrative genomics map of M. tuberculosis. Since then more than a dozen of research are published. OSDD currently operates the OSDD Chemistry outreach programme (OSDDChem). Under this system, students are trained in synthetic chemistry and the compounds synthesized in the universities, institutes and colleges in OSDDChem centres are submitted to the OSDDChem database and sent to CSIR-CDRI. These molecules are then taken up for screening at CSIR-CDRI for anti-TB and anti-malarial activity.

== See also ==
- Computational Resource for Drug Discovery
- International Labour Organization
- Basic research
