= GPC Biotech =

Defunct German biopharmaceutical company

GPC Biotech AG
Type	Public
Founded	August 1997
Location	Martinsried, Germany
Key people	Bernd R. Seizinger, M.D., Ph.D. (CEO); Mirko Scherer, Ph.D. (CFO)
Industry	Biotechnology
Products	3 in Clinical or Pre-clinical development
Revenue	€12,649 (2004)
Website	http://www.gpc-biotech.com/

GPC Biotech (also referred to as GPCbiotech and GPC-Biotech) was a German biopharmaceutical company. The company's mission statement reads "... to discover, develop and commercialize new anticancer drugs."

Founded in 1997, the company was held privately until May 2000 when an initial public offering was made on the now defunct German Neuer Markt. Subsequent to the closing of the Neuer, GPC refinanced in June 2004 through a public stock offering and listed ADRs on NASDAQ.

In March 2000, the company acquired Mitotix, a United States biotechnology firm located in Cambridge, Massachusetts. This acquisition has led to the company having ~50% of its employees based in the United States and the remaining 50% in Germany. Further, the acquisition of Mitotix provided convenient proximity to GPC's long term and continuing collaboration with ALTANA Pharma AG and the ALTANA Research Institute, located in Waltham, Massachusetts.

In November 2009, Agennix AG acquired GPC Biotech .

In 2013 Agennix AG went into liquidation.

== Products ==
As of July 2005, the company does not have a marketed product, though it has three therapeutics in its drug discovery pipeline as shown in the table below.

Therapeutic	Type	Phase	Indication
Satraplatin	platinum-based small molecule	Phase III Clinical trial	Hormone-refractory prostate cancer
MAb 1D09C3	monoclonal antibody	Phase I Clinical trial	relapsed/refractory B-cell lymphoma
RGB-286199	small molecule	Pre-clinical development	refractory cancer

== Notes ==
1. Mission statement obtained from http://www.gpc-biotech.com/en/about_the_company/index.html. Retrieved July 9, 2005.
2. A portion of basic corporate information was obtained from the Hoover's Online Fact Sheet for GPC Biotech AG. Retrieved July 9, 2005.
3. reference: Annual Report for the year 2000. Retrieved July 11, 2005.
4. reference: Annual Report for the year 2004. Retrieved July 11, 2005.
