= Endocrine Research =

- Discipline: Endocrinology
- Language: English
- Edited by: Michael Katz

Publication details
- Former name: Endocrine Research Communications
- History: 1979–present
- Publisher: Informa Healthcare (United States)
- Frequency: Quarterly
- Impact factor: 1.408 (2016)

Standard abbreviations
- ISO 4: Endocr. Res.

Indexing
- ISSN: 0743-5800 (print); 1532-4206 (web)

Links
- Journal homepage

Endocrine Research is a peer-reviewed medical journal that covers endocrinology in the broadest context. Subjects of interest include: receptors and mechanism of action of hormones, methodological advances in the detection and measurement of hormones; structure and chemical properties of hormones.

== Editor ==
The editor in chief of Endocrine Research is Michael Katz (San Antonio, Texas).
