= Computational Resource for Drug Discovery =

Computational Resources for Drug Discovery (CRDD) is an important module of the in silico module of Open Source for Drug Discovery (OSDD). The CRDD web portal provides computer resources related to drug discovery, predicting inhibitors, and predicting the ADME-Tox properties of molecules on a single platform. It caters to researchers researching computer-aided drug design by providing computational resources, and hosting a discussion forum. One of the major objectives of CRDD is to promote open source software in the field of cheminformatics and pharmacoinformatics.

== Features ==
Under CRDD, numerous resources related to computer-aided drug design have been collected and compiled. These resources are organized and presented on CRDD so users may locate resources from a single source.

- Target identification provides resources important for searching drug targets with information on genome annotation, proteome annotation, potential targets, and protein structure.
- Virtual screening compiles resources important for virtual screening, such as QSAR techniques, docking QSAR, cheminformatics, and siRNA/miRNA.
- Drug design provides resources important for designing drug inhibitors/molecules, such as lead optimization, pharmacoinformatic, ADMET, and clinical informatics.

== Community contribution ==
CRDD developed a platform where the community may contribute to the process of drug discovery.

- DrugPedia is a wiki created for collecting and compiling information related to computer-aided drug design. It is developed under the umbrella of the OSDD project and covers a wide range of subjects around drugs, like bioinformatics, cheminformatics, clinical informatics etc.
- Indipedia: A wiki for collecting and compiling drug information related to India. It is intended to provide comprehensive information about India created for Indians by Indians. It is developed under the umbrella of the OSDD project.
- The CRDD Forum was launched to discuss the challenges in developing computational resources for drug discovery.

== Indigenous development: software and web services ==
Beside collecting and compiling resources, CRDD members develop new software and web services. All services developed are free for academic use. The following are a few major tools developed at CRDD.

=== Development of databases ===
- HMRBase: A manually curated database of hormones and their receptors. It is a compilation of sequence data after extensive manual literature searches and from publicly available databases. HMRBase can be searched on the basis of a variety of data types. Owing to the high impact of endocrine research in the biomedical sciences, HMRBase could become a leading data portal for researchers. The salient features of HMRBase are hormone-receptor pair-related information, mapping of peptide stretches on the protein sequences of hormones and receptors, Pfam domain annotations, categorical browsing options, and online data submission. This database is integrated with DrugPedia so the public can contribute.
- BIAdb: A database for benzylisoquinoline alkaloids. The benzylisoquinoline The Alkaloid Database serves to gather information related to the BIA's. Many BIA's show therapeutic properties and can be considered as potent drug candidates. This database will also serve researchers working in the field of synthetic biology, as developing medicinally important alkaloids using synthetic processes is one of the important challenges. This database is also integrated with DrugPedia so the public can contribute.
- Antigen DB: This database contains more than 500 antigens collected from literature and other immunological resources. These antigens come from 44 pathogenic species. In Antigen DB, a database entry contains information regarding the sequence, structure, origin, etc. of an antigen with additional information such as B and T-cell epitopes, MHC binding, function, gene expression, and post-translational modifications, when available. AntigenDB also provides links to major internal and external databases.
- PolysacDB: A database dedicated to providing comprehensive information about antigenic polysaccharides of microbial origin (bacterial and fungal), antibodies against them, proposed epitopes, structural detail, proposed functions, assay system, cross-reactivity-related information and more. It is a manually curated database where most of dthe ata has been collected from PubMed and PubMed Central literature databases.
- TumorHoPe: TumorHoPe is a manually curated comprehensive database of experimentally characterized tumor homing peptides. These peptides recognize tumor tissues and tumor-associated microenvironments, including tumor metastasis.
- ccPDB: A database designed to service researchers working in the field of function or structure annotation of proteins. This database of datasets is based on the Protein Data Bank (PDB).
- OSDDchem: This chemical database is an open repository of information on synthesized, semi-synthesized, natural, and virtually designed molecules from the OSDD community.
- CancerDR: A database of 148 anticancer drugs and their effectiveness against around 1000 cancer cell lines. CancerDR maintains comprehensive information about these drugs, their target gene/protein, and cell lines.

=== Software developed ===
- MycoTB: An extended flexible system concept for building standalone Windows software. The software allows users to build their own flexible systems on their personal computers to manage and annotate whole proteomes of MycoTB.

=== Resources created ===
- CRAG: Computational resources for assembling genomes (CRAG) were created to assist users in assembling genomes from short read sequencing (SRS). CRAG pursues the following major objectives:
  - Collection and compilation of computation resources
  - Brief description of genome assemblers
  - Maintaining SRS and related data
  - Service to community to assemble their genomes
- CRIP: Computational resources for predicting protein–macromolecular interactions (CRIP) were developed to provide resources related to interaction. This site maintains a large number of resources on the interaction of proteins that includes protein–protein, protein–DNA, protein–ligand, andprotein–RNA.
- BioTherapy: Bioinformatics for Therapeutic Peptides and Proteins (BioTherapi) was developed for researchers working in the field of protein/peptide therapeutics. The platform was created to provide a single platform for this area of research. This site includes relevant information about the use of peptides/proteins in drugs and synthesis of new peptides. It also covers problems in their formulation, synthesis and delivery processes.
- HIVbio: The HIV Bioinformatics (HIVbio) site contains various types of information on the Human Immunodeficiency Virus (HIV) life cycle and Infection.
- GDPbio: GDPbio (Genome-based prediction of diseases and personalized medicines using Bioinformatics) is a project focused on providing various resources related to genome analysis, particularly for the prediction of disease susceptibility of individuals and personalized medicine development, with the aim of public health improvement.
- AminoFAST: Functional Annotation Tools for Amino Acids (AminoFAST) is a server designed to serve the bioinformatics community. Its aim is to develop as many tools as possible to understand the function of amino acids in proteins based on protein structure in PDB. The broad knowledge of protein function would help in the identification of novel drug targets.

=== Web services for cheminformatics ===
CRDD developed an open-source platform that allows users to predict inhibitors against novel M. tuberculosis drug targets and other important properties of drug molecules like ADMET. Following is a list of few servers.

- MetaPred: A webserver for the prediction of cytochrome P450 isoforms responsible for metabolizing a drug molecule. The MetaPred server predicts metabolizing CYP isoforms of a drug molecule/substrate based on SVM models developed using CDK descriptors. This server is intended to help researchers working in the field of drug discovery. The effort also demonstrates that it is possible to develop free web servers in the field of cheminformatics. This may encourage other researchers to develop web servers for public use, leading to a decreased cost of discovering new drug molecules.
- ToxiPred: A server for prediction of aqueous toxicity of small chemical molecules in T. pyriformis.
- KetoDrug: A user friendly web server for binding affinity prediction of ketoxazole derivatives and small chemical molecules against Fatty Acid Amide Hydrolase (FAAH).
- KiDoQ: A web server to serve researchers working in the field of designing inhibitors against dihydrodipicolinate synthase (DHDPS), a potential drug target enzyme of a unique bacterial DAP/Lysine pathway.
- GDoQ: GDoQ (Prediction of GLMU inhibitors using QSAR and AutoDock) is an open-source platform for predicting inhibitors against Mycobacterium tuberculosis (M. tb) drug target N-acetylglucosamine-1-phosphate uridyltransferase (GLMU) protein. This is a potential drug target involved in bacterial cell wall synthesis. This server uses molecular docking and QSAR strategies to predict the inhibitory activity value (IC50) of chemical compounds for the GLMU protein.
- ROCR: The ROCR is an R package for evaluating and visualizing classifier performance. It is a flexible tool for creating ROC graphs, sensitivity/specificity curves, area under the curve, and precision/recall curves. The parametrization can be visualized by coloring the curve according to cutoff.
- WebCDK: A web interface for the CDK library which is used for predicting descriptors of chemicals.
- Pharmacokinetics: This data analysis determines the relationship between the dosing regimen and the body's exposure to the drug as measured by the drug's nonlinear concentration time curve. It includes a function to calculate area under this curve. It also includes functions for half-life estimation for a biexponential model and a two phase linear regression.

=== Prediction and analysis of drug targets ===
- RNApred: Prediction of RNA binding proteins from its amino acid sequence.
- ProPrint: Prediction of interaction between proteins from their amino acid sequence.
- DomPrint: A domain-domain interaction (DDI) prediction server.
- MycoPrint: A web interface for exploration of the interactome of Mycobacterium tuberculosis H37Rv (Mtb) predicted by the "Domain Interaction Mapping" (DIM) method.
- ATPint: A server for predicting ATP interacting residues in proteins.
- FADpred: Identification of FAD interacting residues in proteins.
- GTPbinder: Prediction of protein GTP interacting residues.
- NADbinder: Prediction of NAD binding residues in proteins.
- PreMier: Software for predicting mannose interacting residues in proteins.
- DMAP: Designing of mutants of antibacterial peptides.
- icaars: Prediction and classification of aminoacyl tRNA synthetases using PROSITE domains.
- CBtope: Prediction of conformational B-cell epitope in a sequence from its amino acid sequence.
- DesiRM: Designing of Complementary and Mismatch siRNAs for silencing a gene.
- GenomeABC: A server for benchmarking of genome assemblers.
