= International Institute of Information Technology, Pune =

Private institute

Hope Foundation and Research Centre - International Institute of Information Technology, Pune (I²IT)
- I Square IT
- Hope Foundation and Research Centre - International Institute of Information Technology (I²IT), Pune
- Motto in English: Innovation and Leadership
- Type: Engineering Institute
- Established: 2003
- Founder: Shri. P. P. Chhabria
- Accreditation: NAAC NBA
- Academic affiliations: Savitribai Phule Pune University; AICTE
- President: Aruna M Katara
- Principal: Dr. Vaishali V. Patil
- Registrar: Mr. Dinesh Joje
- Academic staff: 78
- Students: 776
- Undergraduates: 776
- Postgraduates: 0
- Doctoral students: 0
- Location: P-14, Rajiv Gandhi, Infotech Park, Hinjewadi, Pune, Maharashtra 411057, Pune, India; 18.5849554°N 73.7351462°E
- Campus: 10 acres (4.0 ha)
- Language: English
- Website: www.isquareit.edu.in

The International Institute of Information Technology, Pune (I^{2}IT), pronounced as I Square IT, Pune, is an autonomous Engineering College approved by All India Council of Technical Education (AICTE), New Delhi, India, is recognised by the Directorate of Technical Education, Govt of Maharashtra, Mumbai, India and approved by Savitribai Phule Pune University (SPPU) [formerly known as University of Pune]. The college code is [EN - 6754]. The Institute offers four-year degree program in engineering in three domains: Computer Science, Information Technology and Electronics & Telecommunication. The engineering college was established in 2011 to offer skilled graduates to meet the needs of the industry and is spread over 10 acres of land in Rajiv Gandhi Infotech Park, MIDC Phase 1, Hinjawadi, Pune, Maharashtra, India.

== History ==
In the late 1990s, to control the outflux of graduates as well as to reduce if not crush the brain drain to US and European countries, Mr. P. P. Chhabria, then the president of MCCI (A). Shri P P Chhabria sought advice from scientists like Padma Bhushan, Dr. R. A. Mashelkar and Padma Shri Dr Vijay P Bhatkar, who have been closely associated with this institute over the years. On 28 May 2003, Bharat Ratna Dr. A. P. J. Abdul Kalam, the former President of India, visited I^{2}IT and dedicated this institute to the service of the nation.

IT Task Force & Recommendation to set up I^{2}ITs	1998
Lecture by Padmashree Dr. Vijay Bhatkar at MCCIA AGM in the presence of Pralhad P Chhabria, Dr. A. P. J. Abdul Kalam, the former President of India	1999
Decision taken by Shri. Pralhad P Chhabria & Padmashree Dr. Vijay Bhatkar to set up I^{2}IT	1999
I²IT vision unfolded in the presence of Dr. R. A. Mashelkar	2000
Institution building & infrastructure	2001
First Prototype Course	2001
Formation of International Academic Council	2002
Dedicated to the service of our nation by Bharat Ratna Dr. A P J Abdul Kalam, Former President of India	2003
Postgraduate courses in IT & Management	2003
Emerges as the largest graduate school in IT with a wide bouquet of course offerings	2005
Intel chooses I^{2}IT to lead Multi-Core Education & Research Program	2007
NASSCOM launches Cornerstone Program with I^{2}IT	2007
IBM launches Software Centre of Excellence on I^{2}IT campus	2009
Approved Institute for DST INSPIRE Science Camps	2009
AICTE approved Undergraduate Engineering campus	2011
Recognized by Directorate of Technical Education (DTE)	2011
The institute is affiliated to Savitribai Phule Pune University of Pune (formerly University of Pune)	2011
The institute becomes an approved centre for AICTE-BSNL Employability Enhancement Training Programme (EETP)	2013
Launch of Pralhad P Chhabria Research Centre	2016

== Academics ==
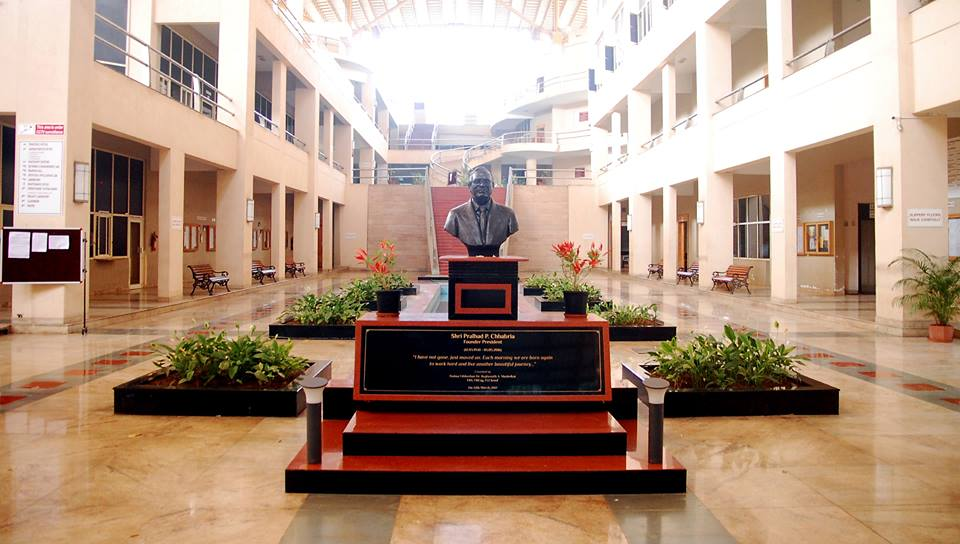
Infrastructure of I2IT

Programs offered are as follows:

- B.Tech. in Computer Engineering
- B.Tech. in Information Technology
- B.Tech. in Electronics & Telecommunication
- M.Tech. in Computer Engineering

== Campus life ==
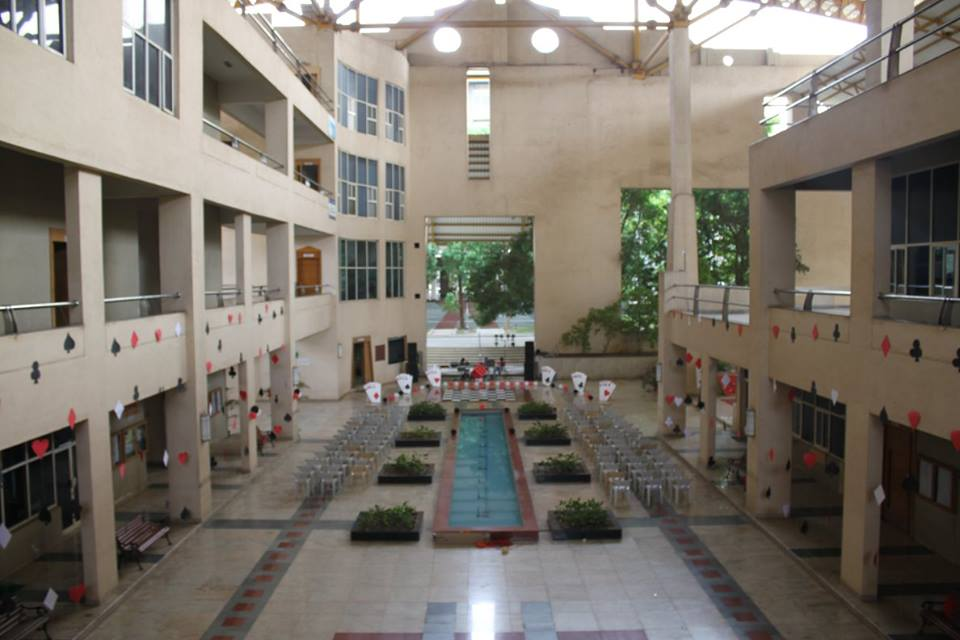
Campus at I2IT, Pune

Several facilities are offered on campus:

- Cafeteria
- Central Computing Facility
- Hostel Facility
- Library Facility
- Sports and Recreational Facilities
