= Indraprastha Institute of Information Technology, Delhi =

Autonomous university in Delhi, India

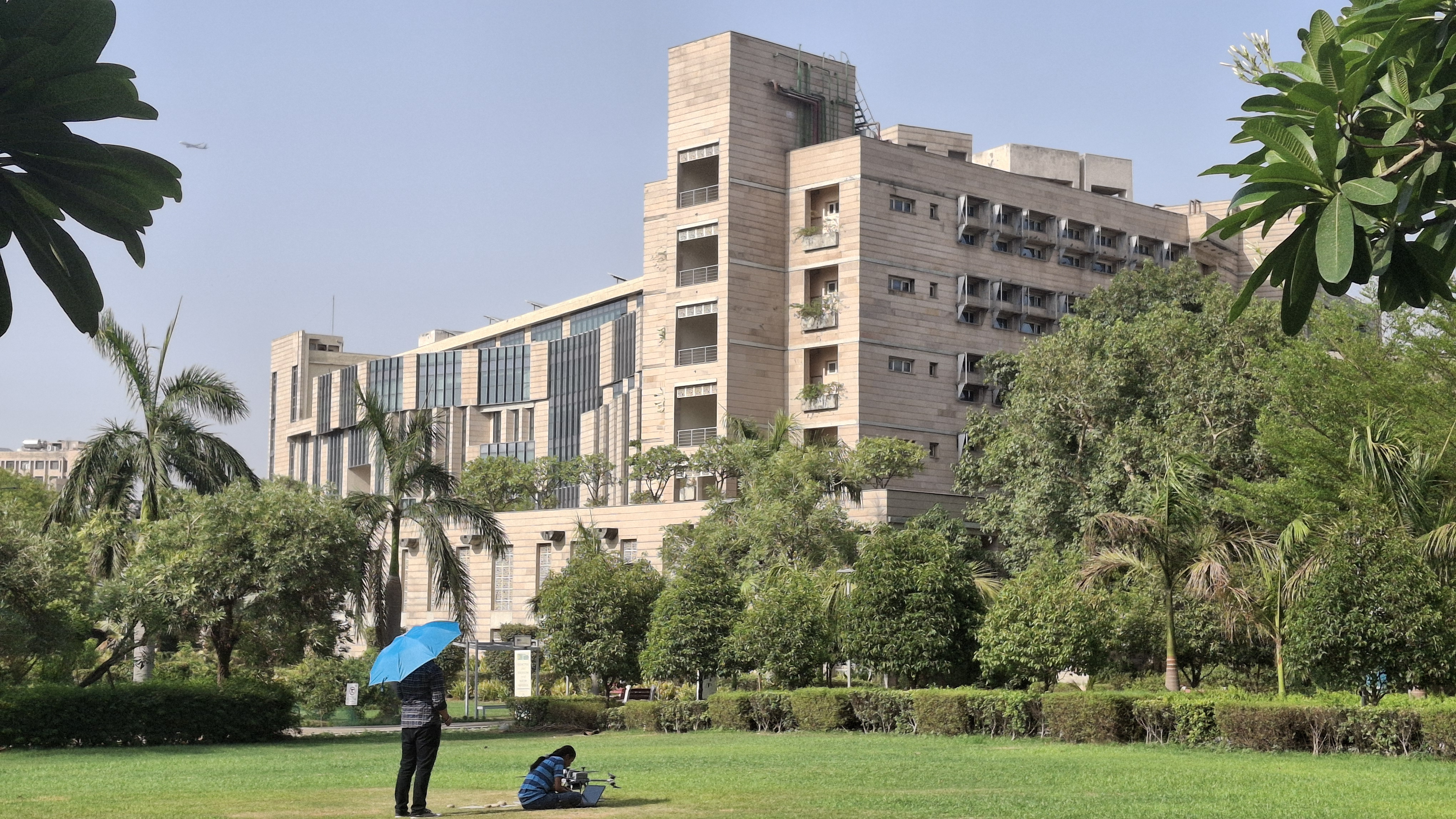
- The campus in 2024
- Other names: IIIT-D, IIIT Delhi
- Type: State university
- Established: 2008; 18 years ago
- Chairperson: Rajesh Srivastava
- Director: Sandeep Sen
- Location: Okhla Industrial Estate, Phase III, New Delhi, 110020, India; 28°32′40″N 77°16′21″E
- Campus: 25 acres (10 ha); Urban
- Language: English
- Colours
- Website: www.iiitd.ac.in

The Indraprastha Institute of Information Technology, Delhi (IIIT-Delhi) is a state university located in Delhi, India. IIIT Delhi offers B.Tech., M.Tech. and Ph.D. degrees. IIITD also offers PhD degrees to students through the Department of Social Sciences and Humanities.

== History ==
IIIT-D started at the Netaji Subhas University of Technology (NSUT) campus at Sector 3, Dwarka, Delhi. It was founded as a State University by an act of the Delhi Government (The IIIT Delhi Act, 2007) in 2008, with seed support from the Government of NCT of Delhi. The institute began with its first batch of 60 students on 8 September 2008 from NSUT (NSIT at that time). IIIT-Delhi moved to its current permanent campus in August 2012. The campus was inaugurated by Sheila Dikshit, former Chief Minister of Delhi, in October 2012. The university is accredited an 'A' grade by NAAC (National Assessment and Accreditation Council), and has been accorded 12-B status by the University Grants Commission (UGC). IIIT-Delhi is an autonomous university, with the board fully authorized to take important decisions of its own volition.

== Campus ==
IIIT Delhi operates from its campus in Okhla Industrial Estate, Phase III, New Delhi. Its campus is spread over 25 acres.

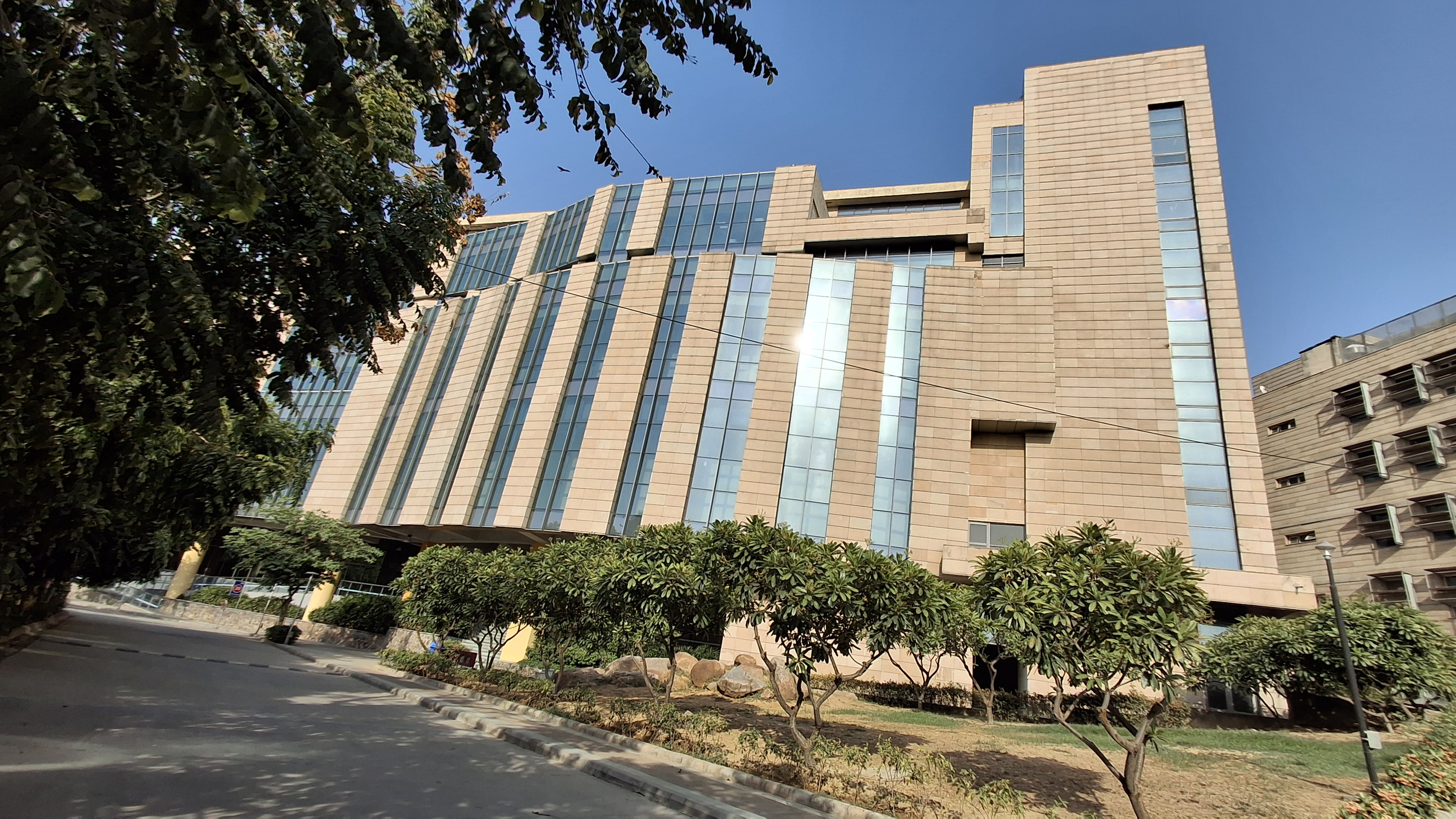
New Academic Block

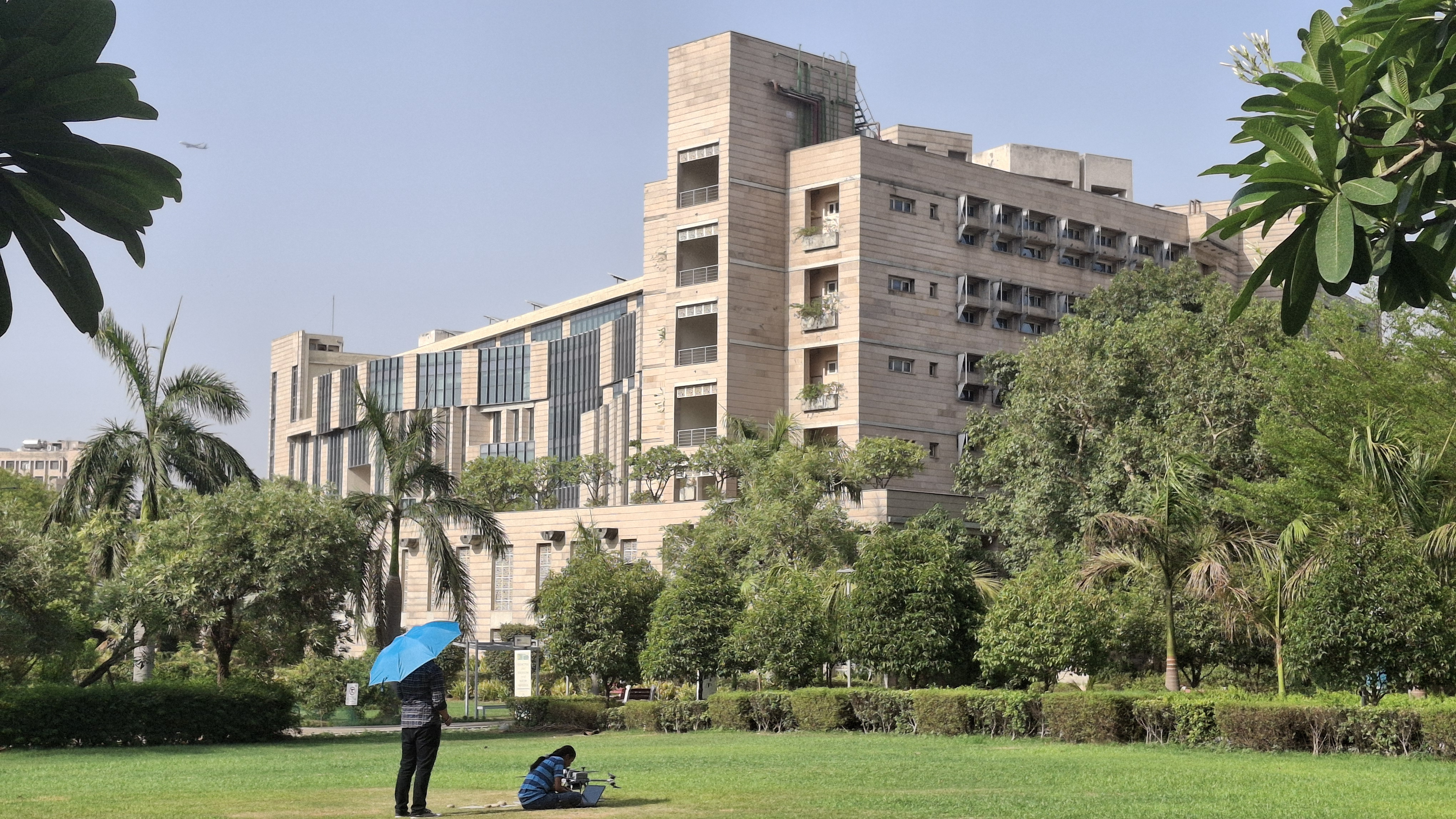
Main Building

The campus consists of an academic complex, a library and information center, a dining and recreation centre, and hostels.

=== Phase 2 Development ===
Arvind Kejriwal, the Chief Minister of Delhi inaugurated Phase-II of the campus on 21 August 2018. New Academic Block, Lecture Hall Block, Residential (Faculty Residence) Block, Hostel Block H1, Hostel Block H2, and Sports Block are built in the campus and collectively called Phase II. The eight-storey R&D Block which includes 4 hundred-seater lecture halls, 58 labs, 24 discussion rooms, 7 meeting rooms, 116 faculty rooms and office spaces has been operational since August 2017.

The 11-storeyed Hostel Block H1 which has 21 married accommodation facility and 197 double-seater rooms has been functional since February 2018. The Residential faculty has 12 stories with 44 flats, which are occupied since March 2018. The six-storey Lecture Hall Block with one 500-seater and two 300-seater lecture theaters, classrooms and instructions labs became functional in August 2018.

The newly built sports block is equipped with various facilities such as a badminton court, a heated indoor swimming pool, table tennis tables, a gym, a yoga room, and 2 squash rooms. The institute also has a multi-purpose sports field, two tennis courts, a basketball court, and a volleyball field. The Phase II expansion of IIIT-D is estimated to enhance its student uptake from over 1,800 in 2015 to 3,000.

== Organisation and administration ==
=== Leadership ===
- Chairpersons of the Board of Governors
  - Mr. Kiran Karnik (2008–2024): Former President of NASSCOM
  - Prof. Rajesh Srivastava (2024-Present): Professor at IIT Roorkee
- Directors
  - Prof. Pankaj Jalote (2008-2018): Founding Director
  - Prof. Ranjan Bose (2018-2025): Formerly at IIT Delhi,
  - Prof Gajendra P. S. Raghava (2025-2026): Director
  - Prof Sandeep Sen (2026-present): Director

=== Funding ===
The land and infrastructure of IIIT-D is funded by the Government of Delhi. A grant of Rs 4,21,00,000 (4CR) has been earmarked for the development of the IIIT-D Innovation & Incubation Center by the Department of Science of technology, Government of India. The university reported an expenditure of Rs '58,79,45,226'(58CR) in the financial year of 2018–2019.

=== Governance ===
IIIT-Delhi was established by the Government of Delhi in 2008 as per the IIIT-Delhi Act. The IIIT-Delhi Act ensures administrative and academic autonomy. The general council is the highest body overseeing the institute, and advises the vice-chancellor. The chancellor of the institute is the Lieutenant Governor of Delhi, who also chairs the general council of the institute. The board of governors consists of the director, the chairman, four experts, two government nominees and two professors. The board decides the salaries, the number of positions and selects the four experts. The Senate and board can start degrees/programs. The Senate is empowered to take all academic decisions. The institute's operational head is the director. Overall policy making and governance rests with the board of governors (BOG).

== Academics ==
=== Admission ===
The B.Tech. admissions to various programs of IIIT-D are done through Joint Admission Committee, Delhi (JAC Delhi) together with Indira Gandhi Delhi Technological University for Women, Delhi Technological University, Netaji Subhash University of Technology and Delhi Skill and Entrepreneurship University on the basis of JEE Main rank.

B.Tech. admission to Computer Science and Design (CSD) program can also be done through IIIT-D's direct admission process using UCEED rank. Some seats of the CSD program are reserved for direct admission process using the UCEED rank as of 2021.

B.Tech. admission to Computer Science and Social Sciences (CSSS) program can also be done on the basis of class XII marks (with Mathematics being a mandatory subject in class XII). Some seats of the CSSS program are reserved for direct admission using this process as of 2021.

For candidates applying through JAC Delhi or the Class XII marks route for CSSS, IIIT-Delhi employs a bonus points system that awards up to two additional points to a candidate's final evaluation score. These points recognize special achievements and are awarded in categories such as national and international Olympiads, competitive programming contests, national science and talent scholarships (including NTSE, INSPIRE, IGNITE, and IRIS), sports, chess, and cultural activities. Additionally, a specific bonus point incentive is provided for female candidates based on exceptional Class XII board marks. Candidates seeking direct admission to the CSD program using their UCEED rank are not eligible for these bonus points.

Candidates availing direct admission to the CSD & CSSS programs must be from NCT of Delhi.

=== Rankings ===
University rankings

Internationally, IIIT-Delhi was ranked 351–400 in Asia on the QS World University Rankings of 2023. It was ranked 601–800 in the world by the Times Higher Education World University Rankings of 2023, 177 in Asia in 2022 and 188 among emerging economies.

In India, IIIT-Delhi was ranked 63 among engineering institutes by National Institutional Ranking Framework (NIRF) in 2025.

IIITD was ranked 15th among engineering institutions in India in 2024 by India Today.

=== Library ===
The Library and Information Center of the institute is housed in a separate building and is automated with the help of RFID Technology with EM security. The library is on the first floor and has a large collection of print and electronic media in areas including computer science, electronics and communications, mathematics and statistics, humanities and sciences. A common study area for students is on the ground floor and several labs are on the upper floors. As of 2019, the library contains 10000+ books, 10000+ Ebooks and 700+ Kindles. There is also a reading room facility open 24 hours per day.

=== Faculty ===
IIIT-D has 96 regular faculty members and 16 visiting faculty members.

All regular faculty members have a Ph.D. Degree from reputed universities across the globe. 55% of the faculty members have done their Ph.D. Degree from abroad.

Out of the 104 faculty members, 79 are male and 25 are female.

The CSE & ECE departments alone have approximately 50% of the working faculty strength.

== Student Life ==
=== E-Summit ===
The Institute OrganiZes its annual Entrepreneurial Summit by E-Cell IIIT Delhi.

| Edition | Notable Speakers |
|---|---|
| 2025 | Meeta R. Lochan, Meenakshi Lekhi, D.C Pandey, Sandeep Jain, Haseeb Khan, Kaustubh Agarwal |
| 2024 | Sanjeev Bikhchandani, Ayush Mehra, Ishan Sharma, Nitin Vijay (aka. NV sir) |
| 2023 | Ashneer Grover, Nischay Malhan (aka. Triggered Insaan) |

=== Odyssey ===
The institute organizes its annual cultural fest Odyssey.

| Edition | Notable Performers |
|---|---|
| 2024 | KRSNA, Shankar–Ehsaan–Loy |
| 2023 | Samay Raina, Van Moon, Salim–Sulaiman, Bhoomi Trivedi, Akhil |

=== Esya ===
Esya is the annual technical fest of the college.
