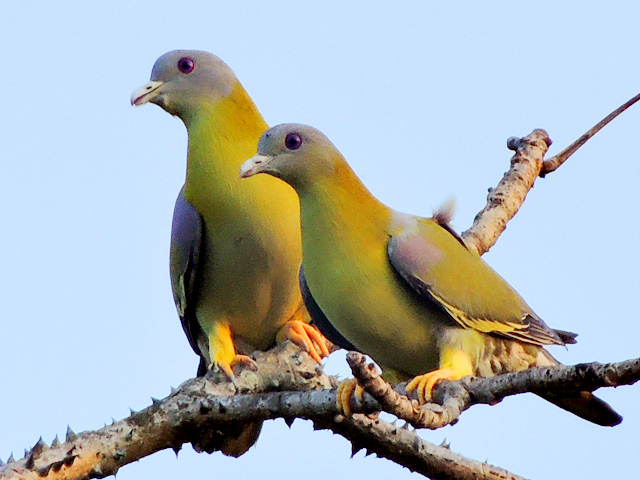
- Pair in Mangaon, Maharashtra, India

Conservation status
- Least Concern (IUCN 3.1)

Scientific classification
- Kingdom: Animalia
- Phylum: Chordata
- Class: Aves
- Order: Columbiformes
- Family: Columbidae
- Genus: Treron
- Species: T. phoenicopterus

Binomial name
- Treron phoenicopterus (Latham, 1790)

Synonyms
- Treron phoenicoptera (Latham, 1790)

= Yellow-footed green pigeon =

Species of bird

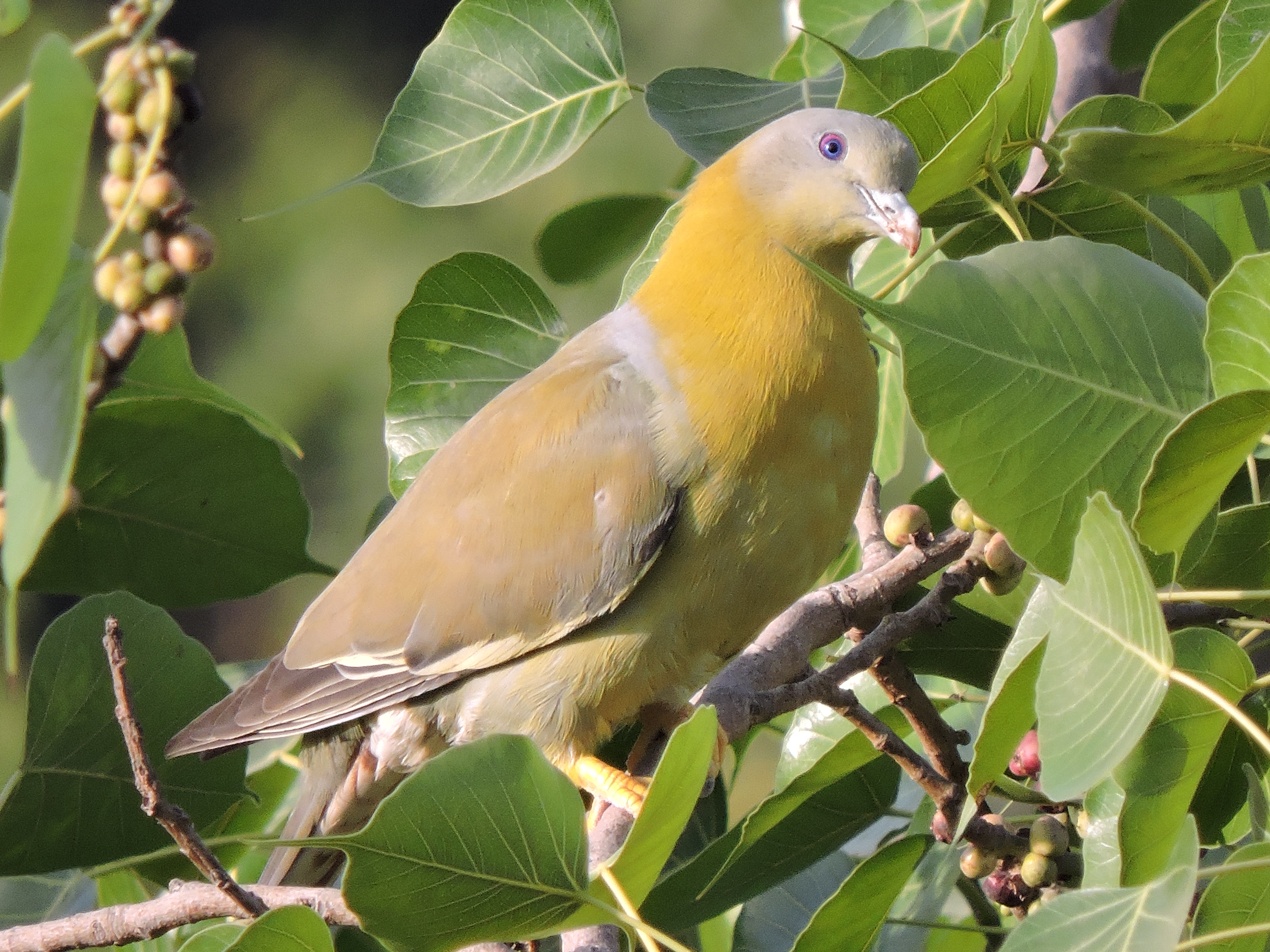
At Punjab Bhavan, New Delhi.

The yellow-footed green pigeon (Treron phoenicopterus), also known as yellow-legged green pigeon, is a common species of green pigeon found in the Indian subcontinent and parts of Southeast Asia. It is the state bird of Maharashtra. Their population is currently increasing.

== Description ==
The yellow-footed green pigeon measures about 33 cm (13 in) long as an adult. Its plumage combines green, yellow, grey, and purple, creating a distinctive appearance. Its most noticeable feature is its bright yellow or yellow-orange legs and feet. Adults have a bluish-grey or greyish crown and nape, a yellowish-green forehead and throat, and a broad yellow or olive-yellow collar around the neck. Their upperparts appear pale greyish-green, while a noticeable mauve or purple patch covers the shoulder. The wings are dark with yellow edges, and the base of the tail has a yellow-green colour. Grey feathers form the end of the tail, while the undertail feathers range from purple to cinnamon-rufous.

=== Geographic Variation ===
The species also shows some geographic variation. Northern birds usually have greyish underparts, while southern birds tend to have more yellow-green underparts.

=== Sexual Dimorphism ===
The species is slightly sexually dimorphic as the male usually has brighter plumage than the female. Northern males have a strongly contrasting yellow-green forehead and throat, a grey cap and lower breast, olive-green upperparts, and a noticeable mauve shoulder patch. Their breast can also show stronger yellow-orange or golden colouring. Historical sources placed particular emphasis on the purple shoulder patch; this feature led John Latham to call the bird the "Purple-shouldered Pigeon".

The female closely resembles the male, but she usually has duller colours and a less noticeable shoulder patch. Modern field guides also describe the sexes as similar, with the female appearing somewhat duller. This similarity caused some confusion among early naturalists. They sometimes could not determine whether differences between specimens resulted from sex or geographic variation.

Latham also noticed differences in the amount of purple on the shoulder and questioned whether some of these differences represented males and females. The pigeon's green and purple plumage provides excellent camouflage among leaves and fruiting fig trees. Historical observers reported that large groups could remain hidden in banyan and peepal trees until someone disturbed them, causing the birds to suddenly fly from trees that had appeared empty.

== Distribution and habitat ==
This species is extant in Pakistan, India, Nepal, Sri Lanka, Bangladesh, Bhutan, Myanmar, China, Thailand, Vietnam, Laos and Cambodia. The species occurs from the lowlands and up into foothill environments. The species has adapted surprisingly well to human-modified landscapes.

The nominate subspecies, T. p. phoenicopterus, lives across northern South Asia. Its range extends from eastern Pakistan and northern India through the Himalayan foothills, the Gangetic Plain, Bangladesh, and Assam.

A second subspecies, T. p. chlorigaster, lives across much of peninsular India, while a third subspaces, T. p. phillipsi, occurs in Sri Lanka. Other subspecies live in Myanmar, southwestern China, Thailand, Laos, and Vietnam.

== Behavior and ecology ==
The yellow-footed green pigeon is principally an arboreal frugivore. It prefers wooded areas with fruiting trees, especially fig trees (Ficus). They forage in flocks. They are habitat generalists: in the early morning, they are often seen sunning on the tops of emergent trees in dense forest areas, especially Banyan trees.

It lives in tropical and subtropical forests, deciduous and semi-evergreen forests, and along forest edges. It also uses wooded farmland, orchards, village groves, gardens, and urban parks. Across much of South Asia, it has become a familiar bird around villages and cities where suitable trees remain.

Historical accounts describe the same behavior. Dr. John Latham, drawing partly on observations from Dr. Francis Buchanan, wrote that the "Hurrial" lived in large fig trees and fed mainly on their fruit. He also noted that the birds stayed in the trees and rarely came to the ground.

== Taxonomy ==
The present scientific name is Treron phoenicopterus (Latham, 1790), placed in the genus Treron established by Louis Vieillot in 1816.

=== Etymology ===
The species name phoenicopterus comes from Greek words associated with crimson or red and wing, giving it the general meaning "red-winged" or "crimson-winged". This name refers to the bird's reddish-purple shoulder and wing feathers. The name Treron comes from the Greek word trērōn, a [timid] pigeon or dove.

=== Subspecies ===
Five subspecies are currently recognized:

- Treron phoenicopterus phoenicopterus (Latham, J, 1790) — eastern Pakistan, northern India, Nepal, and Bangladesh.
- Treron phoenicopterus chlorigaster (Blyth, E, 1843) — central and southern India.
- Treron phoenicopterus phillipsi Ripley, SD, 1949 — Sri Lanka.
- Treron phoenicopterus viridifrons Blyth, E, 1846 — far southwestern China (Yunnan) to Myanmar and northwestern Thailand
- Treron phoenicopterus annamensis (Ogilvie-Grant, WR, 1909) — eastern Thailand, southern Laos, and southern Vietnam.

==== Historical Names ====
Older bird classifications placed the yellow-footed green pigeon in several different genera; historical sources used names such as Crocopus and Treron. For example, E. C. Stuart Baker called the bird Crocopus phoenicopterus, while other authors used Treron phoenicoptera.

Historical names (now obsolete) include:

- Columba militaris
- Columba phaenicoptera*
- Crocopus annamensis
- Sphenocercus pseudocrocopus
- Treron phoenicoptera
- Treron phoenicoptera viridifrons
- Treron sphenura annamensis
- Treron viridifrons

Columba phaenicoptera refers to hybrid specimens as described by Latham in 1790

== Description to Western Science ==
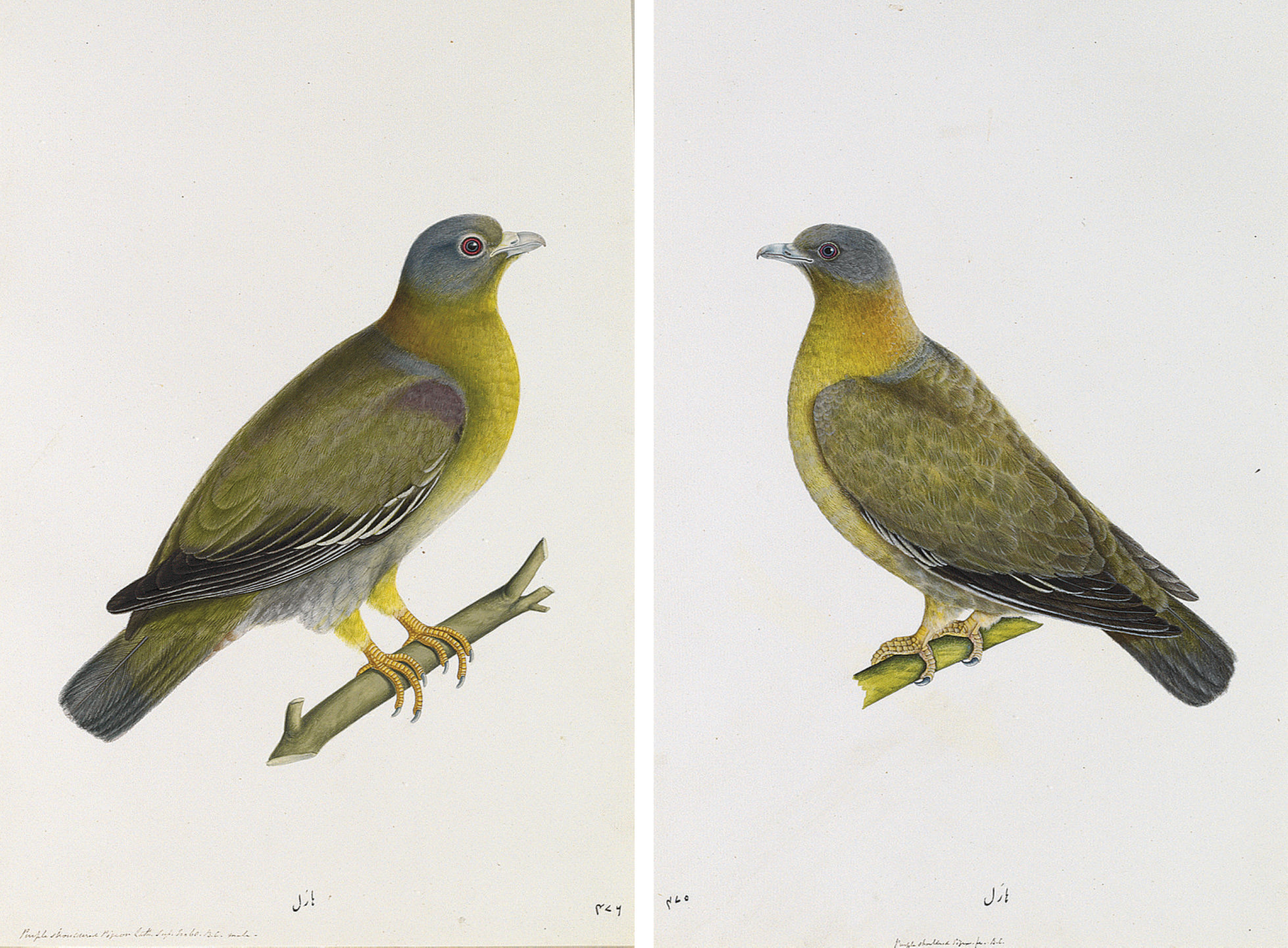
A pair of Treron phoenicopterus (identified as Treron phoenicoptera) featured in a Natural History illustration commissioned by Claude Martin as part of his collection on flora and fauna of India (c. 1775–1785) known as the Lucknow Menagerie.

The bird entered Western scientific classification in 1790, when English naturalist John Latham described it as Columba phaenicoptera in his Index Ornithologicus. Latham listed the type locality simply as 'India'. Later, scientists moved the species into the genus Treron, giving it the name Treron phoenicopterus.

Latham did not base his description on a bird that Europeans had encountered for the first time. Instead, he worked with the large collection of specimens, paintings, and observations that British India supplied to European naturalists. Lady Mary Impey played an important role in this exchange. While living in Calcutta, she maintained a large menagerie and commissioned Indian artists to create detailed paintings of local plants and animals. From 1777 to 1782, Mughal-trained artists such as Shaikh Zain ud-Din, Bhawani Das, and Ram Das produced hundreds of natural-history paintings for her collection.

Wealthy Europeans also contributed to this growing record of India's wildlife by becoming patrons to Mughal artists, encouraging them to paint the specimens in their personal menageries and aviaries in a distinctive, highly detailed art style that became known as the "Company Style". Sir Elijah Impey and Lady Mary Impey commissioned their natural-history collection in Calcutta between 1774 and 1782, while Elijah Impey served as Chief Justice of Bengal. Lady Impey visited the French-born soldier, surveyor, and personal confidant of the ruling Nawab of Lucknow, Asaf-ud-daula, Claude Martin, in 1781 or 1782. This visit from Impey may have influenced Martin's own interest in documenting Indian wildlife. Martin later commissioned a collection of natural-history illustrations known as the Lucknow Menagerie. Art historians believe that his work drew significant influence from the botanical and zoological paintings produced for the Impey collection in Calcutta.

Latham used material connected to Lady Impey's collection in his ornithological work. In his later General History of Birds, he identified his "Purple-shouldered Pigeon" as Columba phoenicoptera and recorded its distribution simply as "Inhabits India.—Lady Impey".

== Indigenous Names and Traditional Uses ==
Like many birds that Western scientists described during the colonial era, the yellow-footed green pigeon had local names and was familiar to people throughout its range long before European naturalists formally described it. In Assam, a historical ornithologist named E. C. Stuart Baker noted in his 1913 book Indian Pigeons and Doves that local names for it often overlapped with names used for the Wedge-tailed green pigeon and Pin-tailed green pigeon.

According to Baker, people may have called the wedge-tailed green pigeon any of the following names: "Sang-pong" in Lepcha, "Daorep-galou" in Kachari, "Lumba-dum Kohhlu" in Hindi, "Bor Haitha" in Assamese, "Harial" in the language spoken in the Terai region at the time, and "Ngu" in Burmese.

In Marathi, it is called "Haroli" or "Hariyal", and it is known as "Haitha" in Upper Assam and "Haitol" in Lower Assam.

== Cultural Significance ==
There are also archaeological references to birds and doves in ancient and early medieval Assam, but researchers cannot conclusively identify them as yellow-footed green pigeons. A 2023 archaeological study by Y. S. Sanathana and Manjil Hazarika describes a small sculpture known as the Da-Parbatiya dove. Archaeologists consider the sculpture likely to depict a dove or a pigeon.

It appears beneath a carved image of the god Kartikeya at the ruins of the Da-Parbatiya temple in Tezpur. The temple belonged to the cultural sphere of the Pragjyotisha-Kamarupa kingdom in the Brahmaputra Valley, which flourished from about the 3rd through 12th centuries CE. Sanathana and Hazarika suggest that the carved bird may relate to the Shiva Purana, a Hindu religious text. In one story in the text, the god Agni takes the form of a pigeon or dove and carries the god Shiva's reproductive material to the six Krittika goddesses who birthed and served the god Kartikeya. However, the sculpture does not provide evidence that people depicted the yellow-footed green pigeon specifically. Archaeologists cannot determine the species from the sculpture alone, so the carving only establishes that artists in the region represented a pigeon or dove and that birds in the family Columbidae were considered culturally important to people in the bird's historic range.

== Conservation status ==
The yellow-footed green pigeon was most recently assessed by the IUCN Red List of Threatened Species in 2024. The species is currently classified as Least Concern, meaning it does not face a high risk of extinction. Its population trend is listed as increasing.
