= Study of a Stork =

1781 painting by Shaykh Zayn al-Din

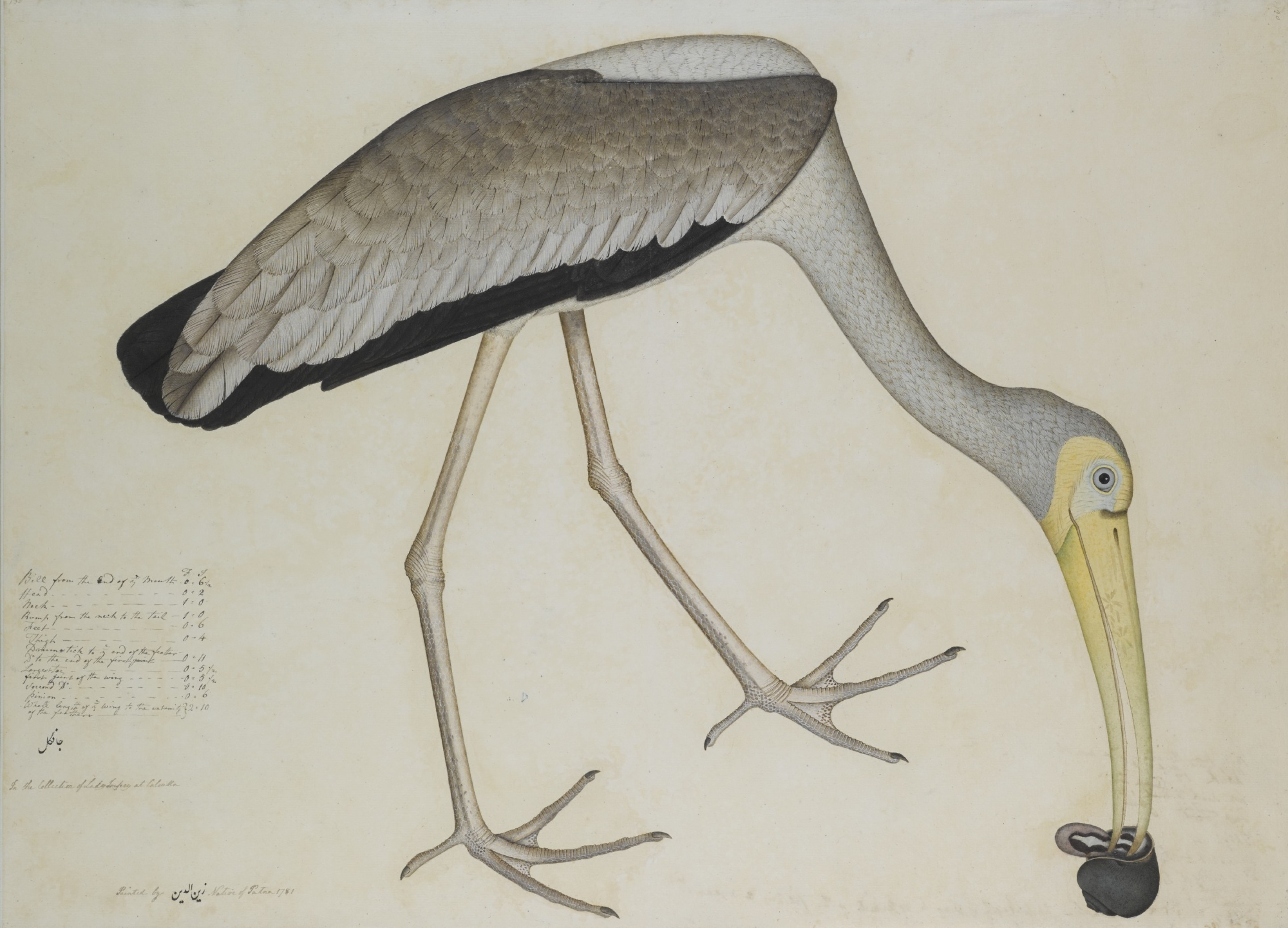
- Artist: Shaykh Zayn al-Din
- Completion date: 1781
- Medium: Watercolour painting
- Dimensions: 54 cm × 75 cm (21 in × 30 in)

Study of a Stork (1781), originally from the Impey Album, is a life-size watercolor painting of a juvenile painted stork in the Company painting style, by Shaykh Zayn al-Din, one of the three artists employed by Lady Impey. It depicts a stork eating a snail, with its measurements listed to the left of the drawing. The painting was bought by Jacqueline Kennedy in the 1970s, before being acquired by the Khosrovani-Diba collection. At Sotheby's it was called the Kennedy Stork.

== See also ==
- Black Stork in a Landscape
