= Mazhar Ali Khan (painter) =

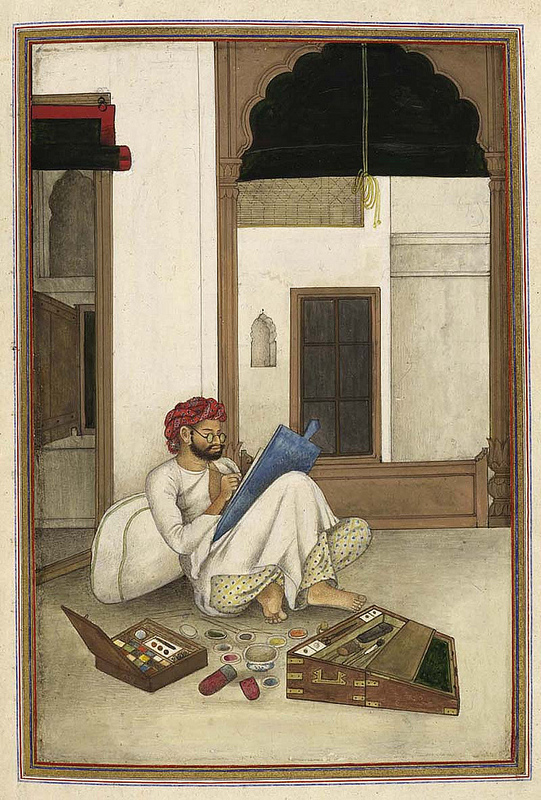
- Self portrait
- Born: Delhi
- Died: Mughal India
- Known for: Topographical paintings, portraits
- Notable work: Delhi Book; Fraser Album
- Style: Company style

Mazhar Ali Khan was a late-Mughal era, 19th century painter from Delhi, working in the Company style of post-Mughal painting under Western influence. He was active from 1840, and is known for his noted work of topographical paintings commissioned by Sir Thomas Metcalfe's, Delhi Book.

== Life ==
He was born in Delhi. He received the rigorous Mughal training, and became a part of a dynasty of great miniature artists.

=== The works ===
While working in India as the Governor-General's Agent at the Imperial court of the Mughal Emperor, between 1842 and 1844, Metcalfe ordered a series of images of the monuments, ruins, palaces and shrines from Delhi artist, Mazhar Ali Khan. He executed 100 paintings which made it to the book.

== Gallery ==
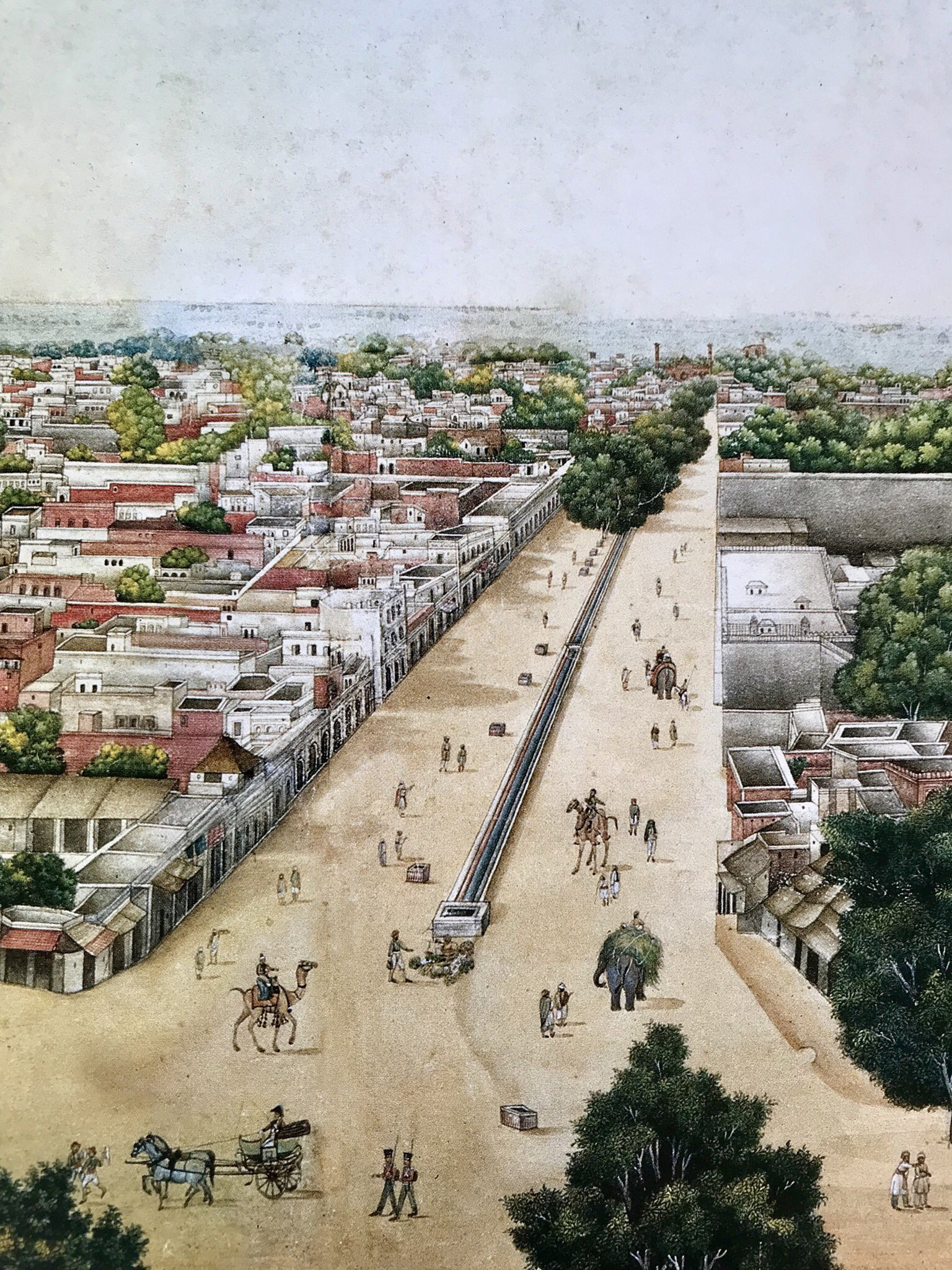
Chandni Chowk, detail from 'The Delhi Panorama', by Mazhar Ali Khan, 1846

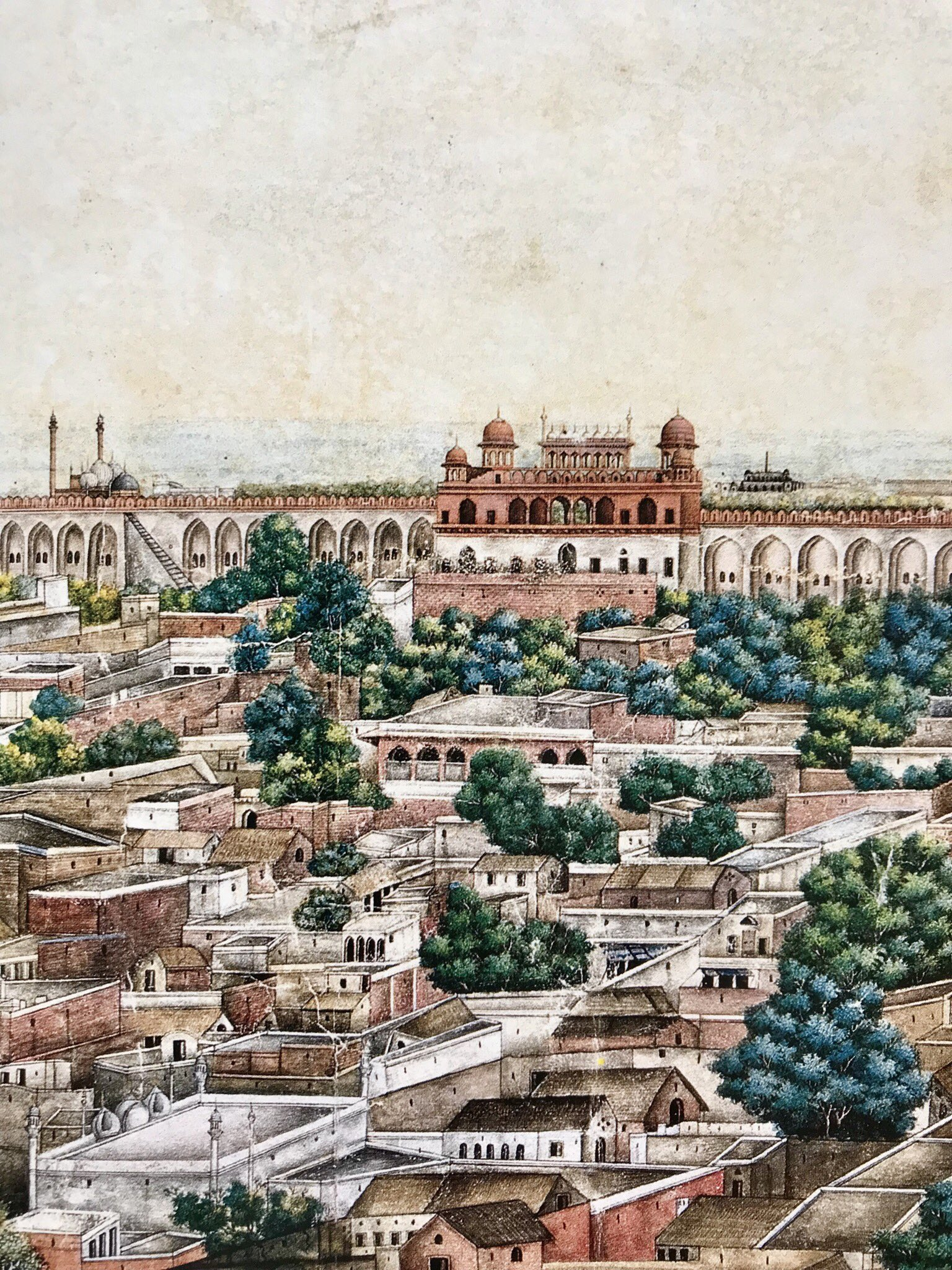
The Delhi Gate, detail from 'The Delhi Panorama', by Mazhar Ali Khan, 1846

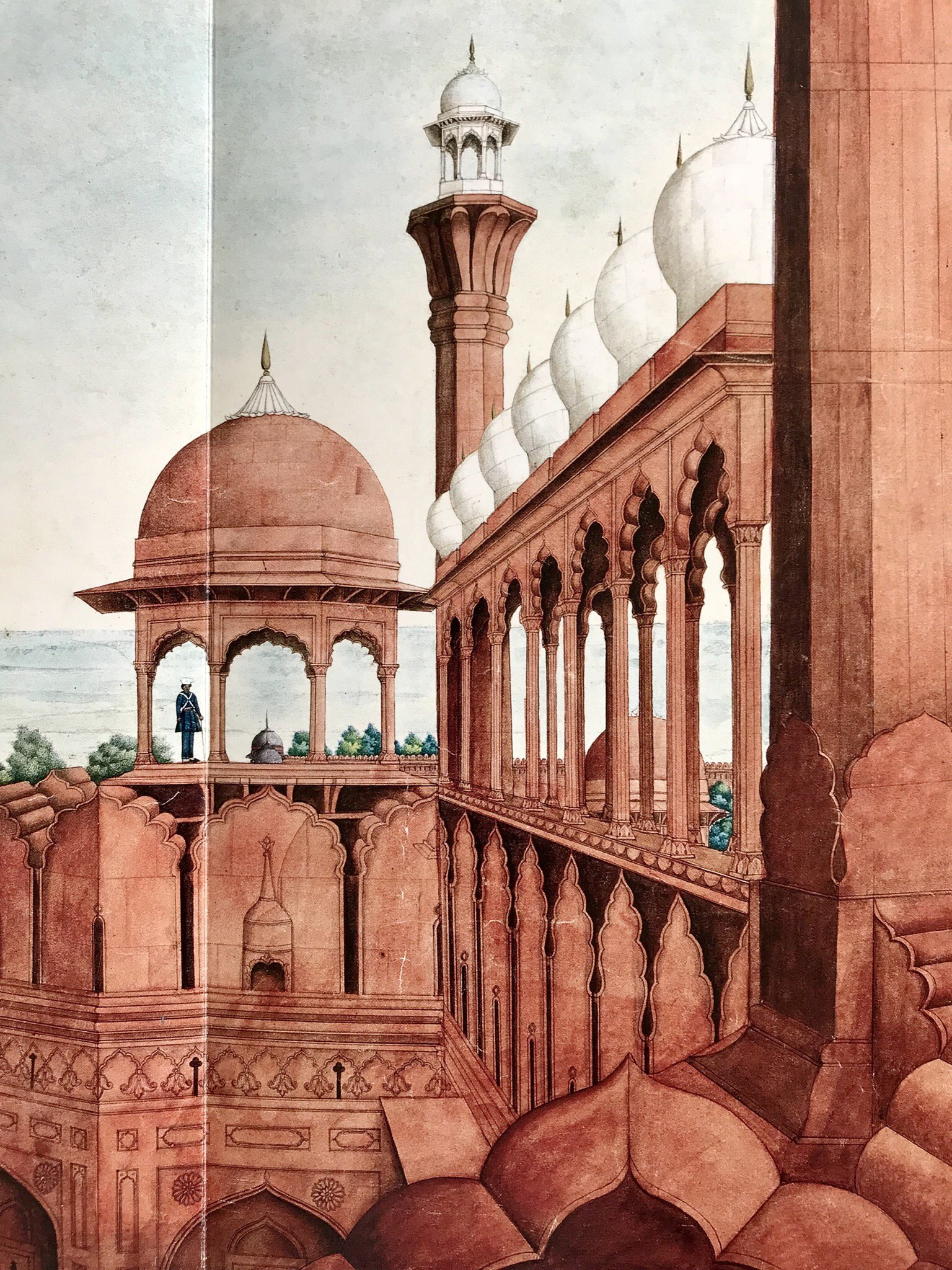
The Lahore Gate, detail from 'The Delhi Panorama', by Mazhar Ali Khan, 1846
