= Sheikh Zainuddin =

Indian artist

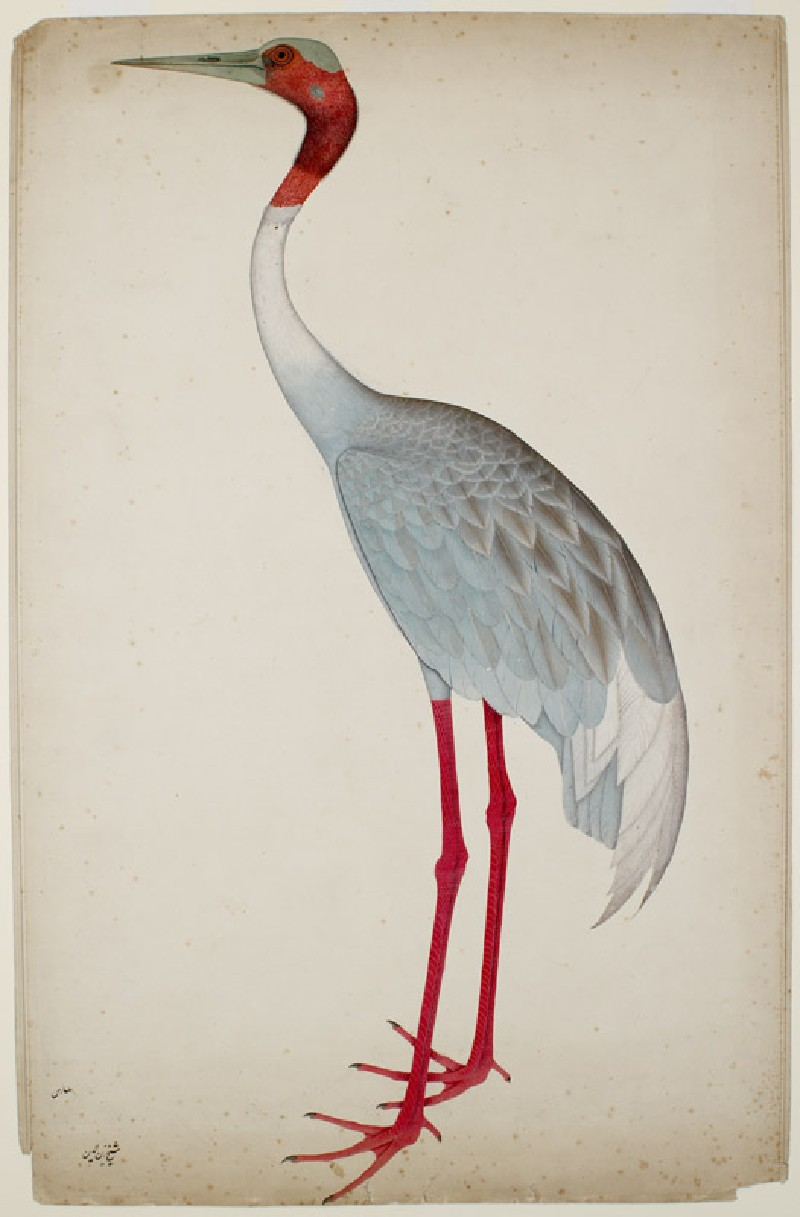
- Saras by Zainuddin
- Born: Patna, Bihar, Company raj
- Known for: Illustrations of fauna and flora
- Patrons: Mary Impey, Elijah Impey

Shaikh Zain-al-Din or Sheikh Zainuddin (fl. 1777–1782) was an Indian Muslim artist who was most well-known for his contributions to the Impey Album and as one of the first artists that helped create the Anglo-Indian "Company style" of painting. Zain-al-Din was one of three of the most prominent Indian artists that had been commissioned by Lady Mary Impey in Calcutta during the period in which the British East India Company controlled most of India and Pakistan, also known as the British Raj.

His works, along with the works of some of his notable contemporaries such as Bhawani Das and Ram Das, blended Mughal painting techniques and Western botanical illustration standards into some of the earliest examples of the aesthetic that became known as the Company style.

== Career ==
In the late eighteenth century, he worked under Lady Mary Impey, the wife of Sir Elijah Impey, Chief Justice of Calcutta Supreme Court. Prior to moving to Calcutta, Shaikh Zain-al-Din, Bhawani Das, and Ram Das had all trained at the Mughal atelier located in the city of Patna. While in Patna, it is believed that Zain-al-Din may have served the Nawab Kasim Ali before he received new patrons.

Between 1774 and 1782, Lady Mary Impey, an English noblewoman and naturalist who sought to document the indigenous fauna and flora of India, commissioned the creation of a large volume of botanical and natural history illustrations from local artists and was the patron of what became known as the Calcutta School.

The artists at the early Calcutta School created more than 300 pieces of art, also known as the Impey Album, over half of which depicted birds. The incredibly detailed images that the artists at the Calcutta School created were biologically accurate, and Lady Mary Impey also kept extensive notes about the habitat and behaviour of the animals that the artists featured. These detailed notes, in collaboration with the zoological illustrations Zain-al-Din and others created, would prove to be of great use to later biologists, such as the English ornithologist Dr. John Latham, who named several new species from them in his supplement to the General Synopsis of Birds (1787).

Among the three known artists Lady Impey brought from Patna to make realistic sketches of birds and animals of her private menagerie, Zain-al-Din was the most prolific. Zain-al-Din combined English botanical illustration with Mughal Patna Qalam style. In his paintings, modern critics appreciate the way a "bright, simple background offsets the keenly wrought details of plants and animals".

From 1777 to 1782, Zainuddin worked on Whiteman art paper manufactured in England for his transparent watercolour paintings. For his tinted drawings and sketches, he employed meticulous calligraphic strokes reminiscent of the works of Mughal Court artist Ustad Mansur. The Ashmolean Museum has some of his art.

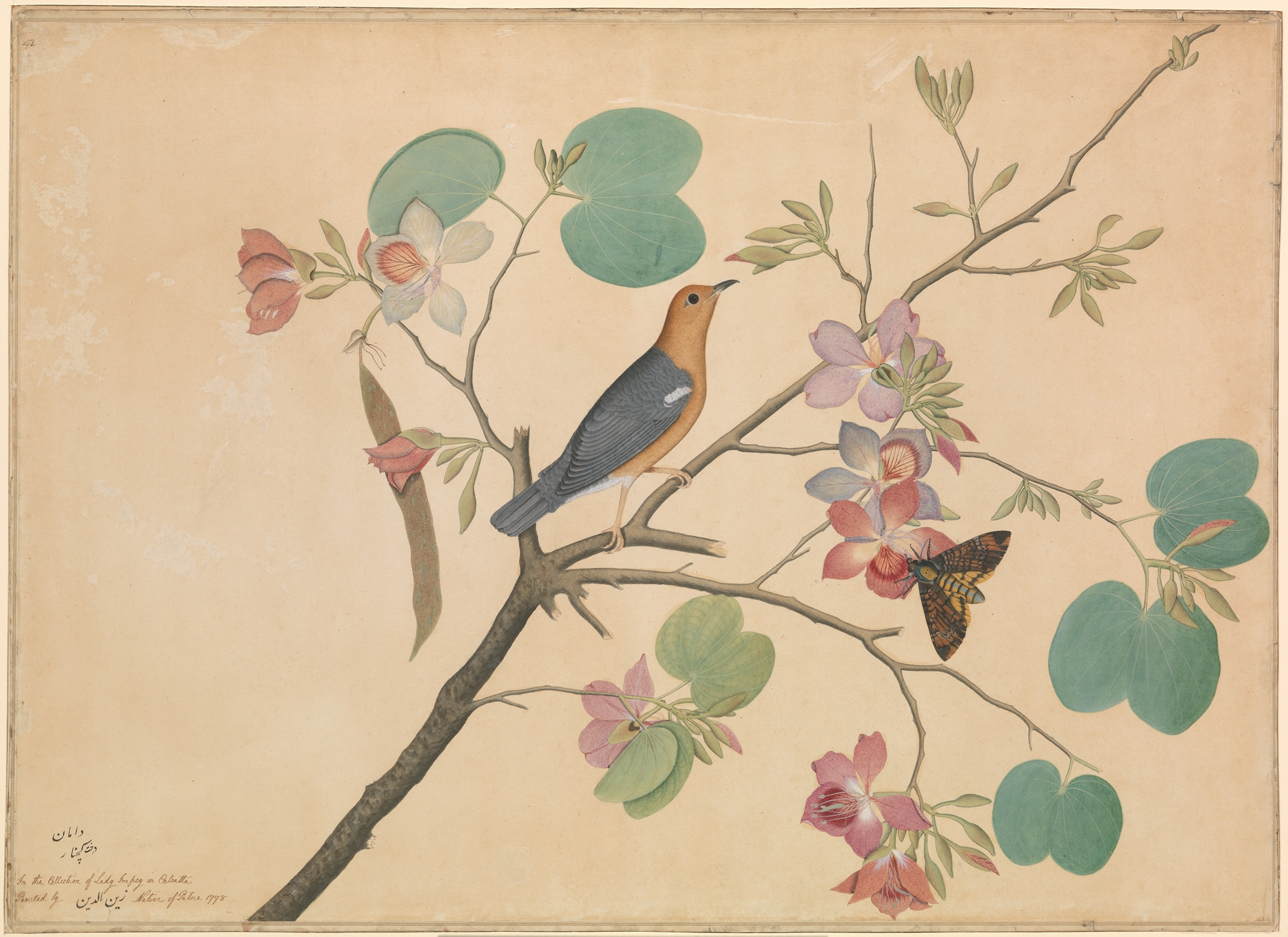
Orange-headed thrush and an Acherontia moth on a Bauhinia

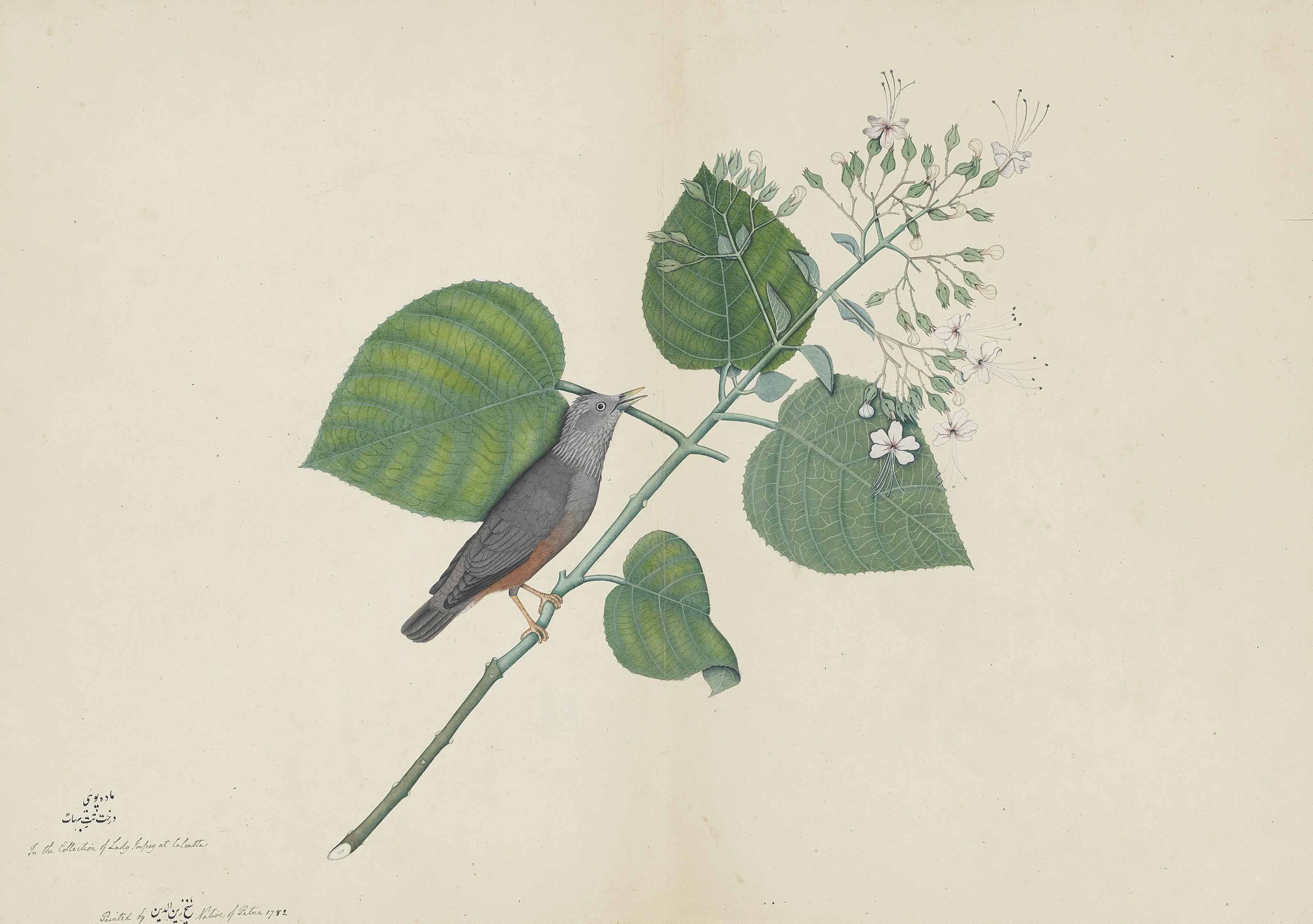
Chestnut-tailed starling on a Clerodendrum sp.

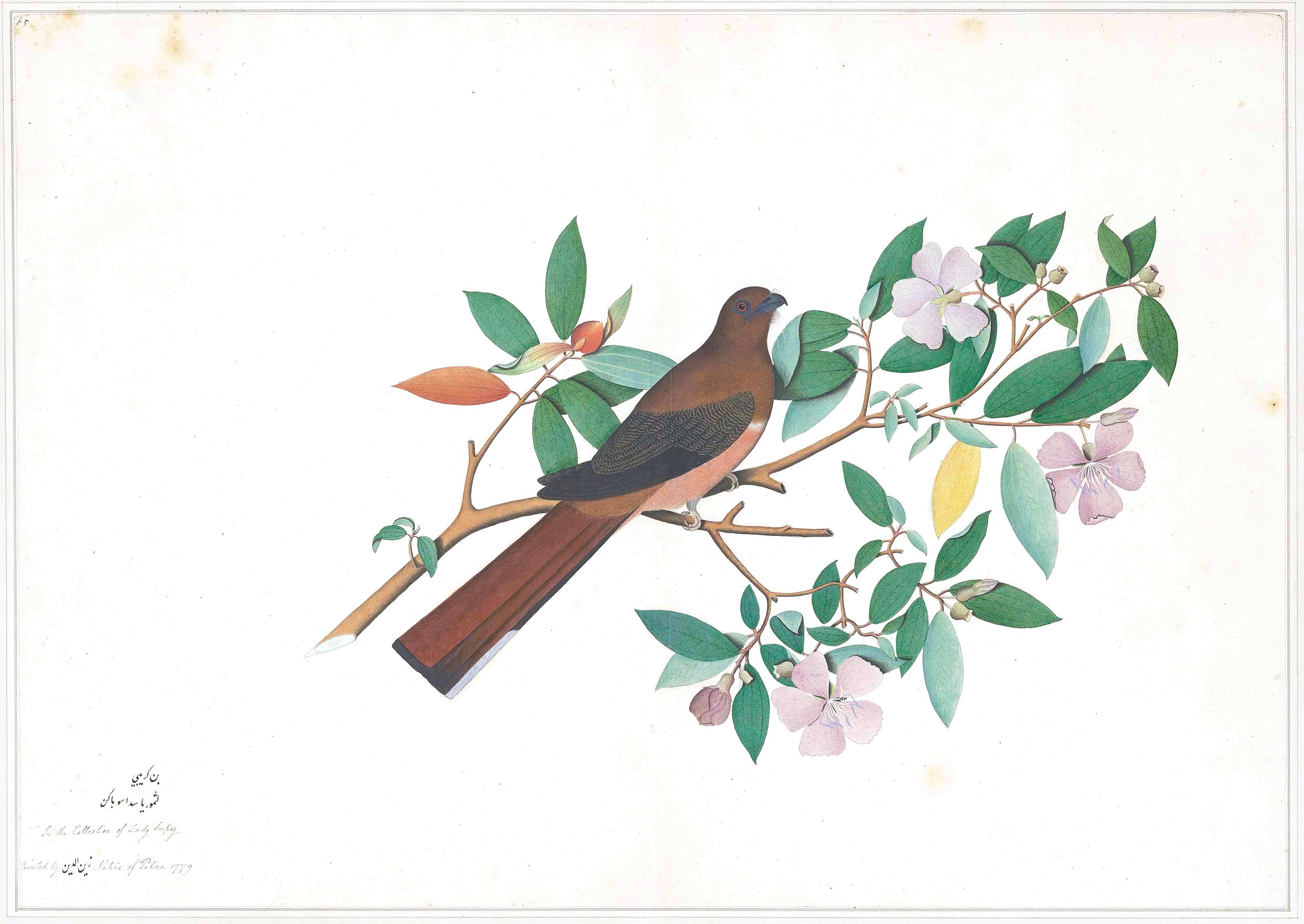
Harpactes erythrocephalus female on a melastome

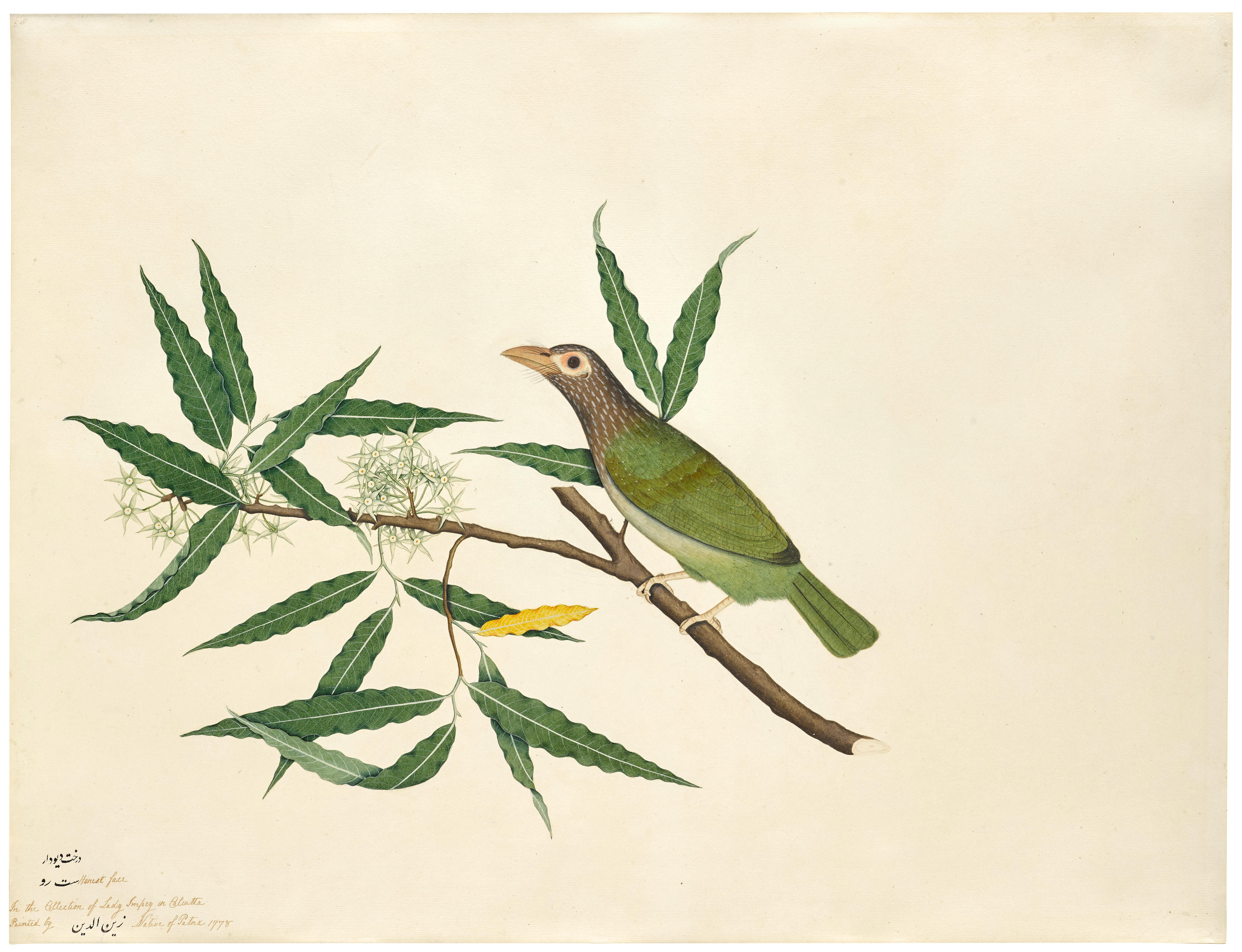
Psilopogon zeylanicus on a Polyalthia

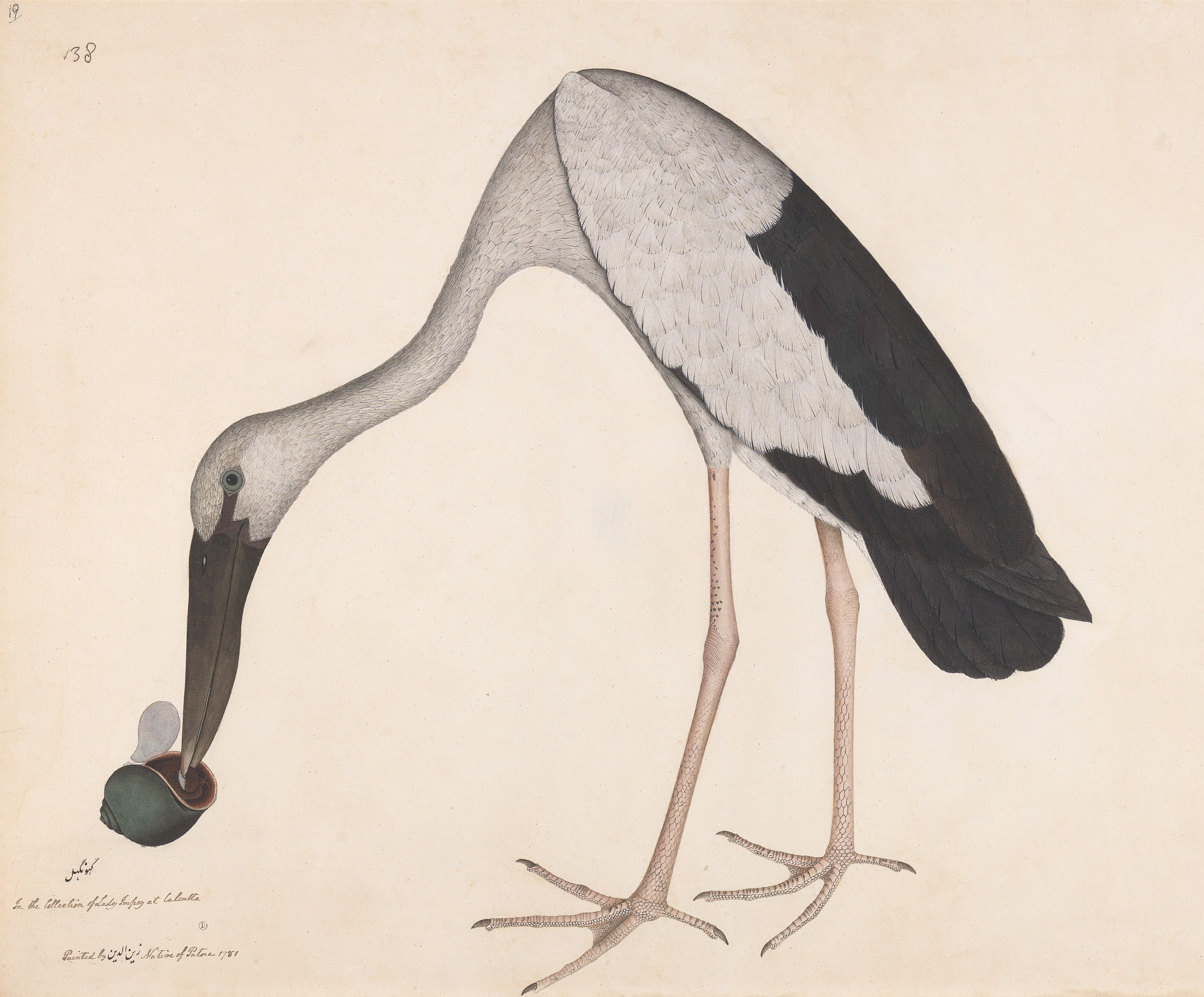
Anastomus oscitans with snail

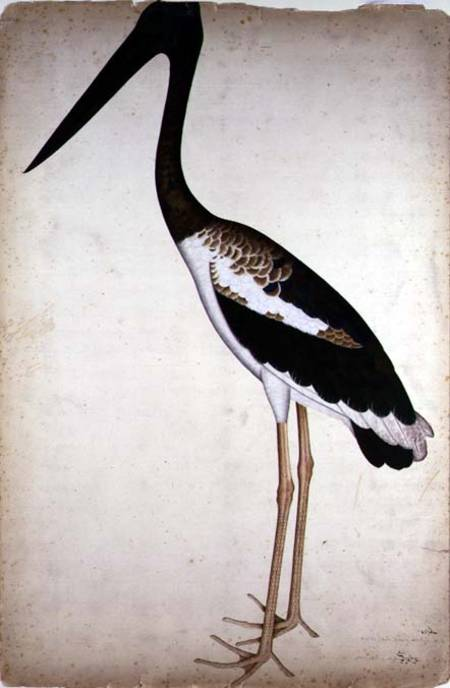
Black-necked stork

== Exhibitions ==
Zainuddin's work was first exhibited in 2016 at the Royal Albert Memorial Museum in Exeter, as part of the Flower Power exhibition. At that point his name, written in an old hand-writing was taken to be "Jack Joyenadey". Since then, researchers working together with the museum staff, have deciphered his name. The updated exhibition is online. Subsequently, Zainuddin's work was exhibited in 2019 at London's Wallace Collection, along with that of 17 other artists commissioned by the British East India Company. The director of the Wallace Collection, Xavier Bray, told Smithsonian that in Zainuddin's paintings, "Everything is incredibly precise and beautifully observant".

== See also ==
- Study of a Stork
