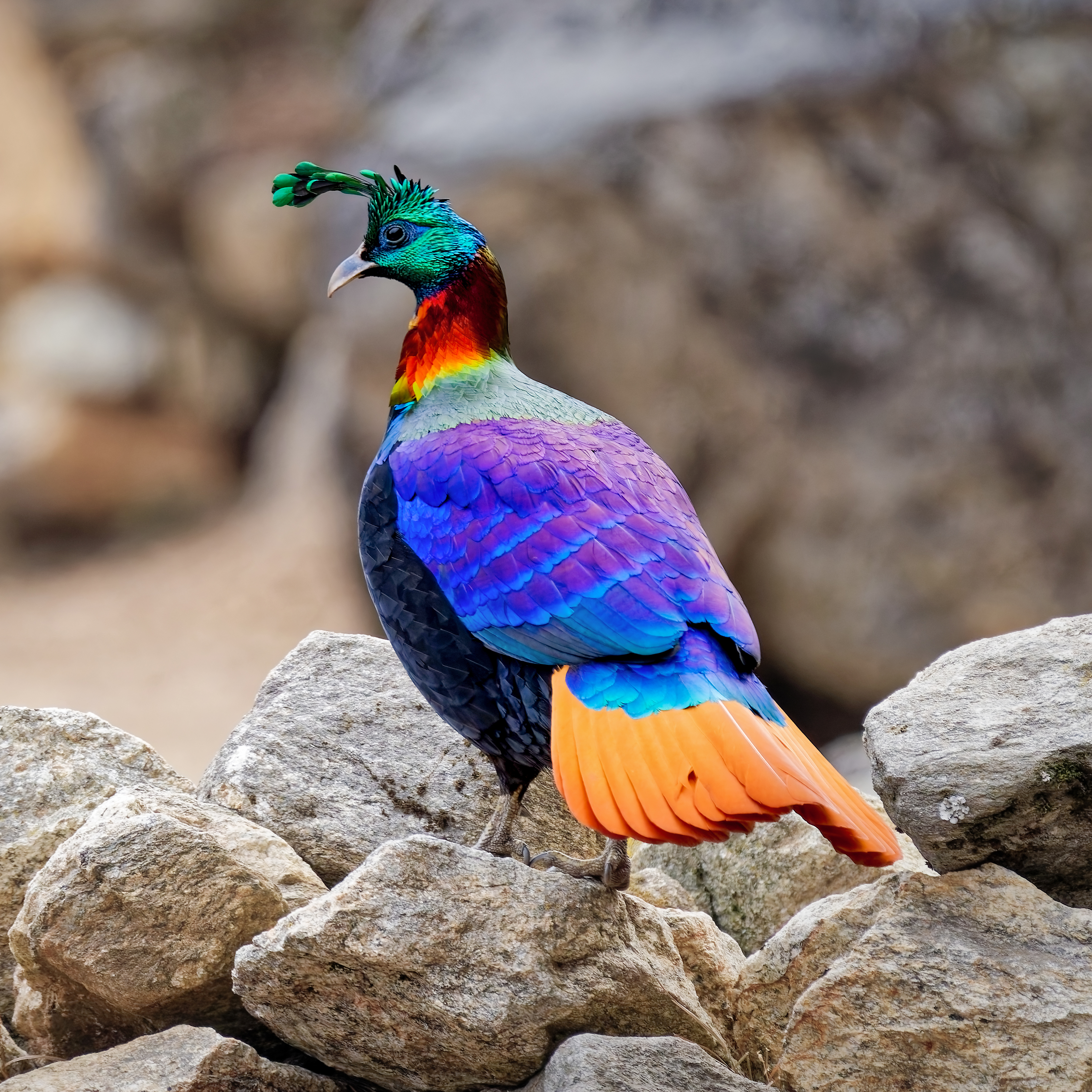
- Male
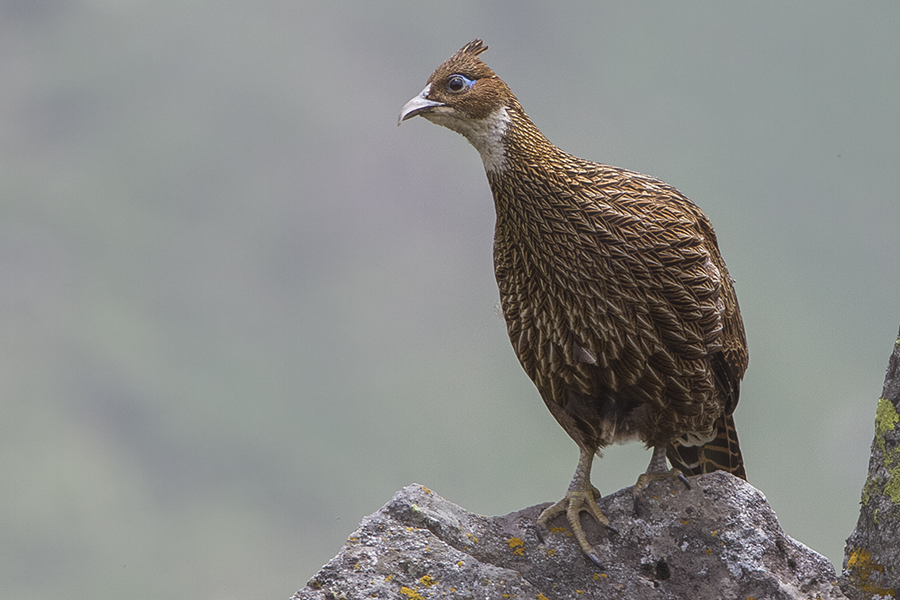
- Female

Conservation status
- Least Concern (IUCN 3.1)
- CITES Appendix I

Scientific classification
- Kingdom: Animalia
- Phylum: Chordata
- Class: Aves
- Order: Galliformes
- Family: Phasianidae
- Genus: Lophophorus
- Species: L. impejanus

Binomial name
- Lophophorus impejanus (Latham, 1790)

= Himalayan monal =

Species of bird

The Himalayan monal (Lophophorus impejanus), also called Impeyan monal, is a landfowl native to Himalayan forests and shrublands at elevations of 2,100–4,500 m (6,900–14,800 ft). It is part of the family Phasianidae and is listed as Least Concern on the IUCN Red List. It is the national bird of Nepal, where it is known as the danphe or danfe, and state bird of Uttarakhand, India, where it is known as a monal. The scientific name commemorates Lady Mary Impey, the wife of the British chief justice of Bengal, Sir Elijah Impey.

== Description ==
It is a relatively large-sized landfowl, 24–30 in (61–76 cm) long and weighing 3–5 pounds (1.4–2.3 kg). The adult male has multicoloured plumage throughout, while the female, as in other landfowl, is more subdued in colour. Notable features in the male include a long, metallic green crest, coppery feathers on the back and neck, and a prominent white rump that is most visible when the bird is in flight. The male's tail feathers are uniformly rufous, darkening towards the tips, whereas the female's lower tail coverts are white, barred with black and red. The female has a prominent white patch on the throat and a white stripe on the tail. The first-year male and the juvenile resemble the female, but the first-year male is larger and the juvenile is less distinctly marked.

== Distribution and habitat ==
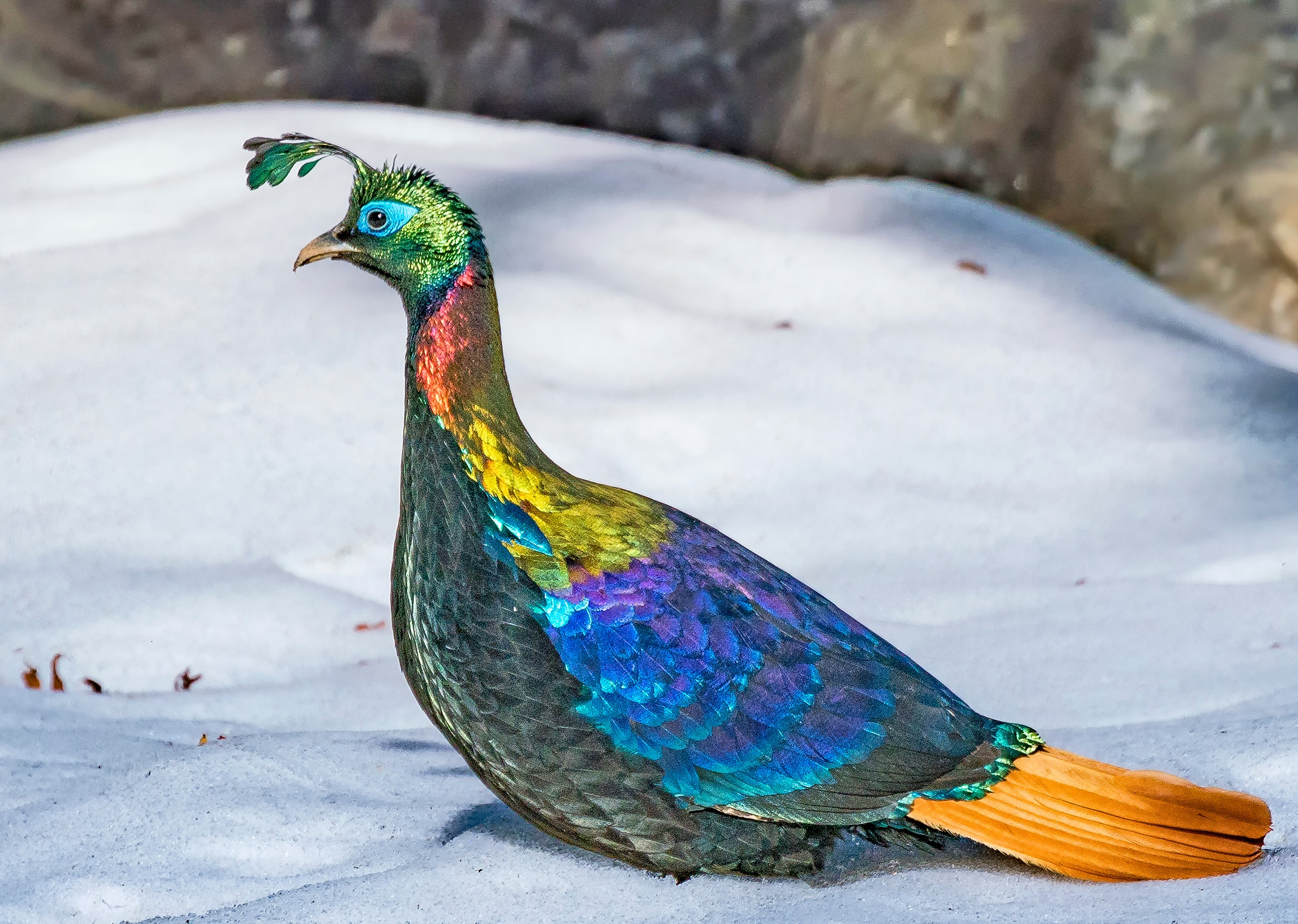
A male in snow near Tungnath, Uttarakhand, India

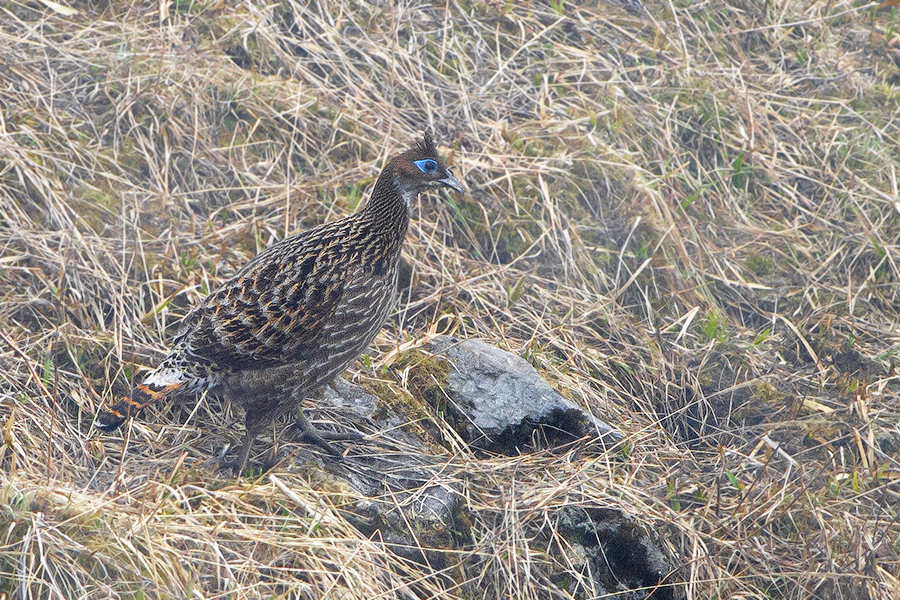
A female in Pangolakha Wildlife Sanctuary, Sikkim, India

The Himalayan monal's native range extends from Afghanistan and Pakistan through the Himalayas in Nepal, India, southern Tibet and Bhutan. In Pakistan, it is common in the Khyber Pakhtunkhwa province and has also been recorded in Kaghan, Palas Valley and Azad Kashmir. In India, it has been recorded throughout the Indian Himalayan Region from Jammu and Kashmir to Arunachal Pradesh. It lives in upper temperate oak-conifer forests interspersed with open grassy slopes, cliffs and alpine meadows between 2,400 and 4,500 m (7,900 and 14,800 ft), where it is most common between 2,700 and 3,700 m (8,900 and 12,100 ft). It descends to 2,000 m (6,600 ft) in the winter. It tolerates snow and digs through it to obtain plant roots and invertebrate prey.

== Behaviour and ecology ==
The diet of the Himalayan monal consists primarily of tubers, nuts, tender leaves, shoots, insects and other invertebrates. It digs in snow for shoots and invertebrates. Plant matter made up a large part of the diet, although invertebrate matter was also present in low percentages.

== Conservation ==
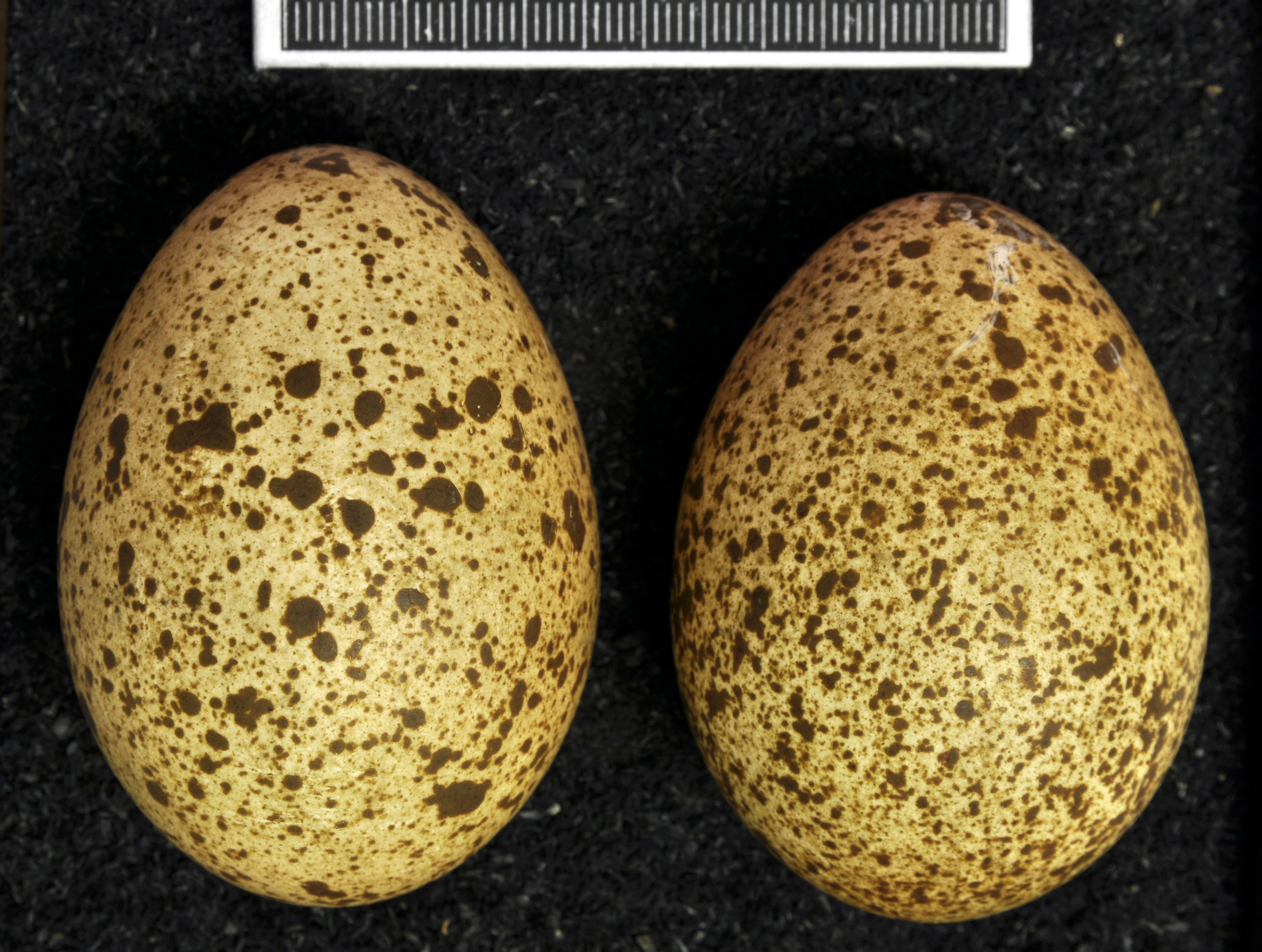
Himalayan monal eggs collection in Museum Wiesbaden

In some areas, the Himalayan monal is threatened due to poaching and other anthropogenic factors. In the western Himalayas, the population responded negatively to human disturbance involving hydroelectric power development. It is not considered endangered in Pakistan and can be easily located. In some areas, the population density of the species is as high as five pairs per square mile. The main threat to the species is poaching, as the crest is valuable. It is thought to bring status to its wearer and is a symbol of authority.
