= Company style =

Style of Indian painting

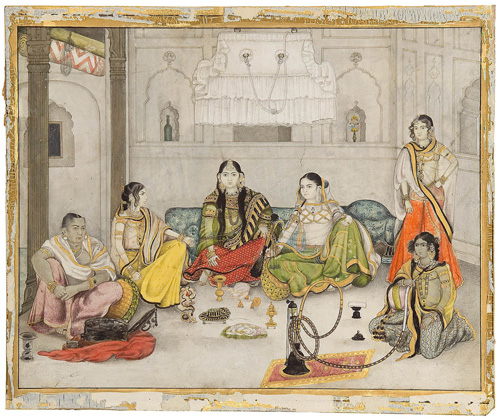
Group of Courtesans, 1800–1825, 26 cm × 31.2 cm (10.2 in × 12.3 in) opaque watercolour and gold on paper

Company style, also known as Company painting, (Hindi: kampani kalam) is a hybrid Indo-European style of paintings made in British India by Indian artists, many of whom worked for European patrons in the East India Company or other foreign Companies in the 18th and 19th centuries. The style blended traditional elements from Rajput and Mughal painting (predominantly) with a more Western treatment of perspective, volume and recession. Most paintings were small, reflecting the Indian miniature tradition, but the natural history paintings of plants and birds were usually life size.

== Locations ==
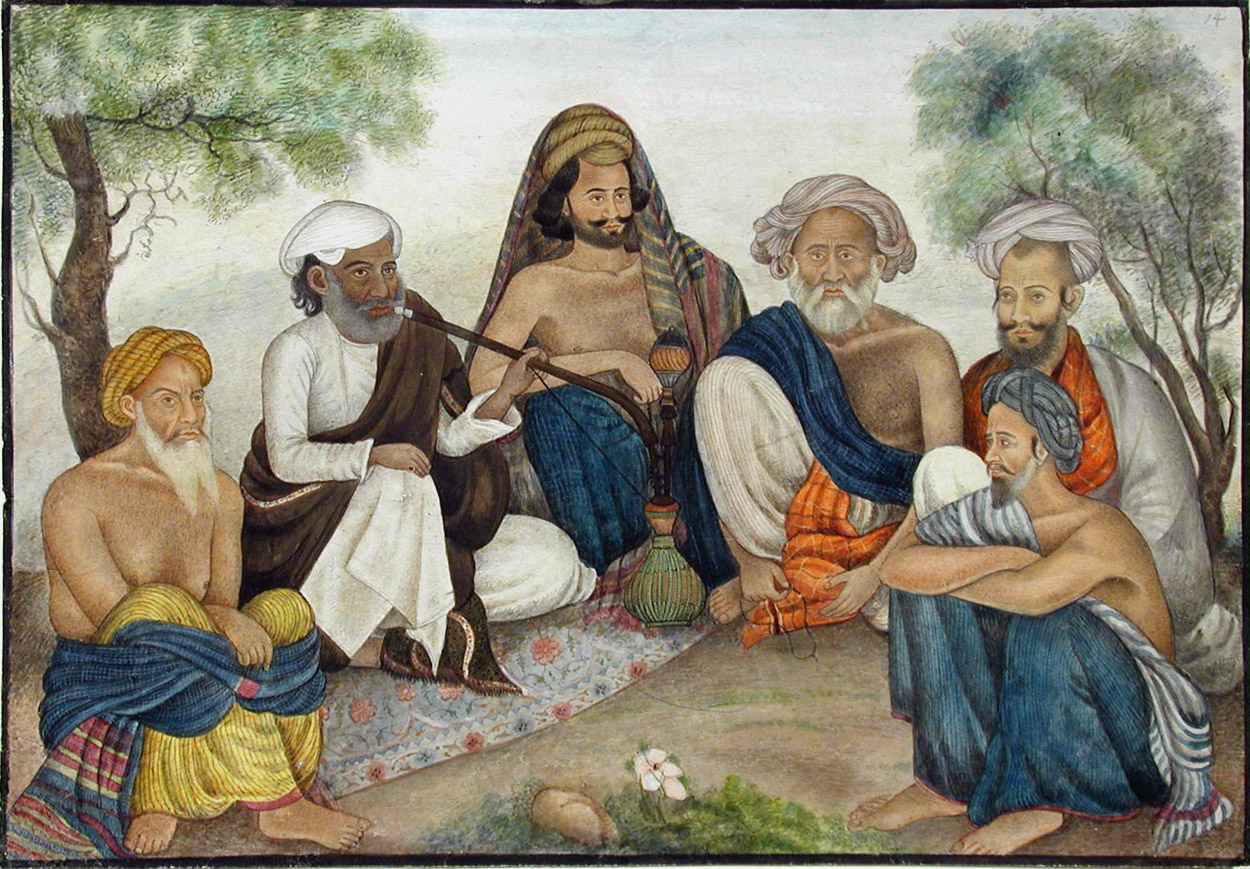
Khan Bahadur Khan with Men of his Clan, c. 1815, from the Fraser Album

First emerging in Murshidabad, later leading centres were the main British settlements or influence centres of Calcutta, Madras, Banaras, Delhi, Lucknow, Patna, Trichinopoly or Tanjore. Subjects included portraits, landscapes and views, and scenes of Indian people, dancers and festivals. Series of figures of different castes or trades were particular favourites, with an emphasis on differences in costume; now they are equally popular as subjects for analysis by historians of the imperialist mentality.

Portfolios of animal or botanical subjects were also commissioned, and some erotic subjects. Architectural subjects were popular, usually done in a detailed and frontal style more like that of an architectural draftsman than the Romanticised style used by most European painters visiting India. The techniques varied, but mostly drew on Western watercolour technique, from which "transparency of texture, soft tones and modelling in broad strokes" were borrowed.

== Patrons and artists ==
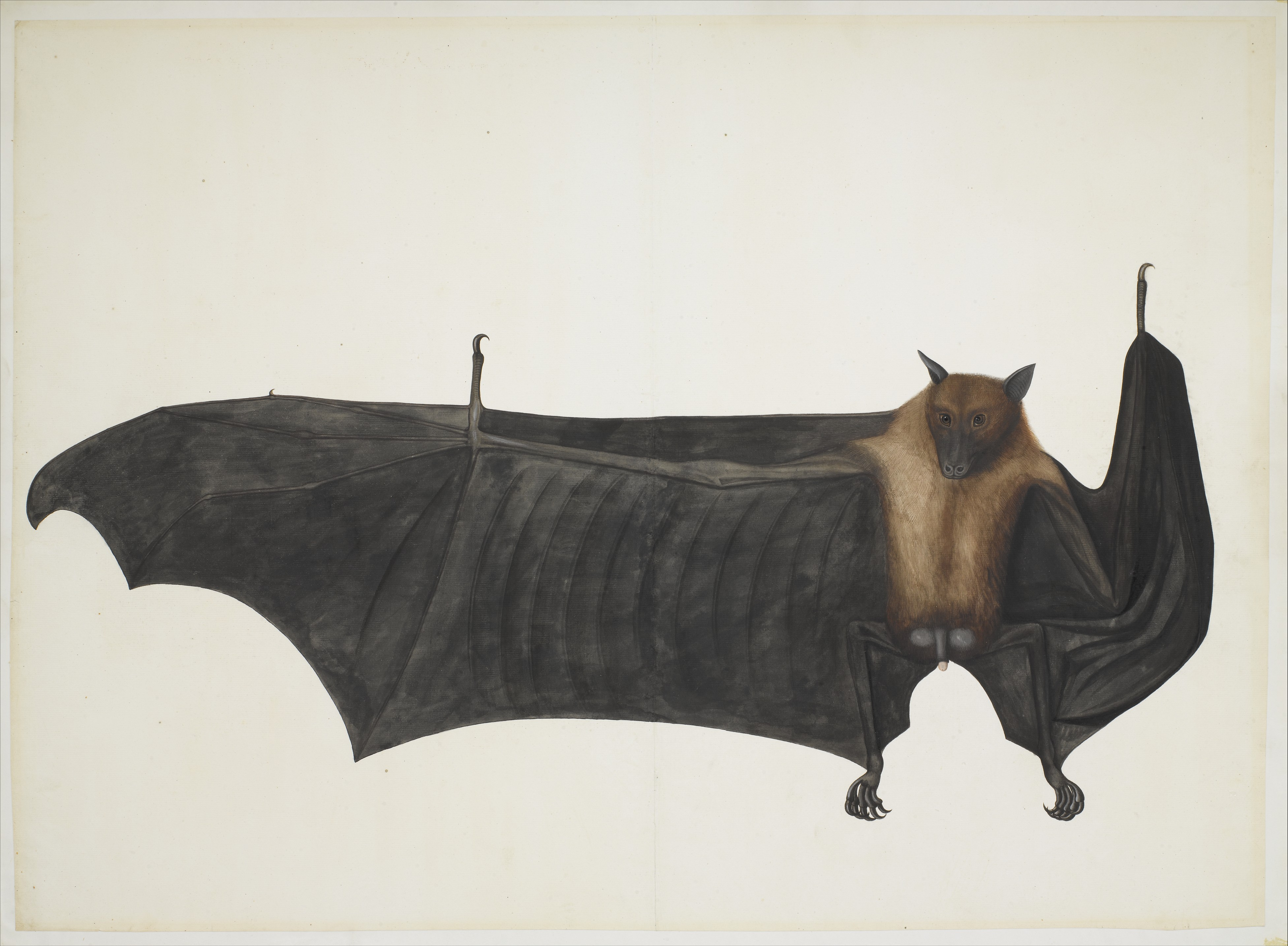
Great Indian Fruit Bat (Pteropus giganteus), Bhawani Das or follower, 1777–82, from Mary Impey's album of natural history paintings

Large-scale patrons included Colonel James Skinner of Skinner's Horse fame, who had a Rajput mother, and commissioned the manuscript "Tazkirat al-Umara (Memoirs of the Nobles) containing portraits of regional elites painted by Company style artists including Ghulam Ali Khan. and for natural history paintings, Mary Impey, wife of Elijah Impey, who commissioned over three hundred for the Impey Album, and the Marquess Wellesley, brother of the first Duke of Wellington, who had over 2,500. There were equivalent movements, but much smaller, around the French and Portuguese possessions in India, and in other South Asian areas like Burma and Ceylon.

The French-born Major-General Claude Martin (1735–1800), latterly based in Lucknow, commissioned 658 paintings of birds, including Black Stork in a Landscape, now in the Metropolitan Museum of Art in New York.

Some notable artists include Mazhar Ali Khan, who worked on Thomas Metcalfe's Delhi Book, and was part of a dynasty of miniature artists, the patriarch of which, Ghulam Ali Khan, had worked for William Fraser on a similar commission known as the Fraser Album, with over 90 paintings and drawings, mostly painted in 1815 to 1819. The Fraser Album came to light in Fraser's papers only in 1979; they are now dispersed. Mazhar Ali Khan, like his uncle Ghulam Murtaza Khan, also painted portraits of the last Mughal emperors and their courts. The art historians Mildred Archer and Toby Falk, say of the Fraser Album: "Although we can never know for certain who painted each Fraser picture, we can be sure on stylistic grounds that they are the work of a single family, that of Ghulam Ali Khan. Although the finest figure drawings among the Fraser pictures are technically superior to known portraits signed by Ghulam Ali Khan, those of the Gurkhas, the recruits, and some of the single figures such as Kala and Umeechund must be by another member of his family".

The Delhi Book or Reminiscences of Imperial Delhi is an album including 120 paintings in Company style, commissioned in 1844 by Sir Thomas Metcalfe, the Company's Agent at the Mughal court after the murder of Fraser in 1835. Most are by Mazhar Ali Khan, and show the final years of the Delhi court, as well as local monuments. The book is now in the British Library in London.

== Material ==
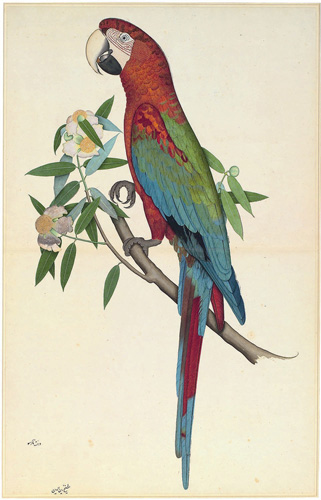
A Green-Winged Macaw, folio from Mary Impey's album of natural history paintings, Attributed by inscription to Shaikh Zain al-Din, Calcutta, about 1780

Paintings were mostly on paper, but sometimes on ivory, especially those from Delhi. They were mostly intended to be kept in portfolios or albums; the muraqqa or album was very well established among Indian collectors, though usually including calligraphy as well, as least in Muslim examples. The style developed in the second half of the 18th century, and by the early nineteenth century production was at a considerable level, with many of the cheaper paintings being copied by rote. By the 19th century many artists had shops to sell the work and workshops to produce it.

== Decline ==
The arrival of photography was a direct blow for the style, but it survived into the 20th century, Ishwari Prasad of Patna, who died in 1950, being perhaps the last notable exponent. In the late 19th century the British established several Schools of Art, where a yet more Westernised version of the style was taught, later in competition with other styles.

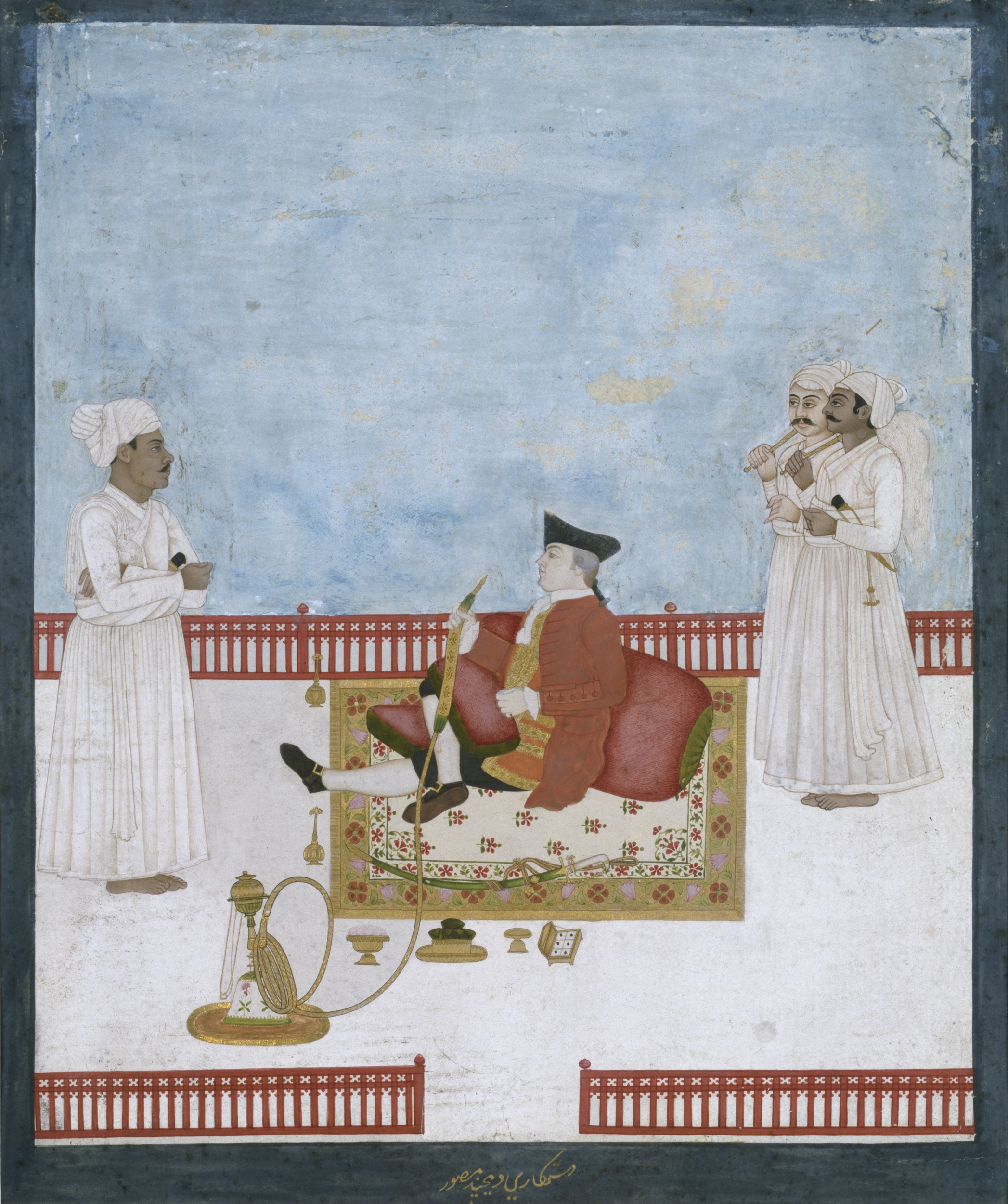
East India Company official and servants, perhaps William Fullerton, surgeon and mayor of Calcutta in 1757

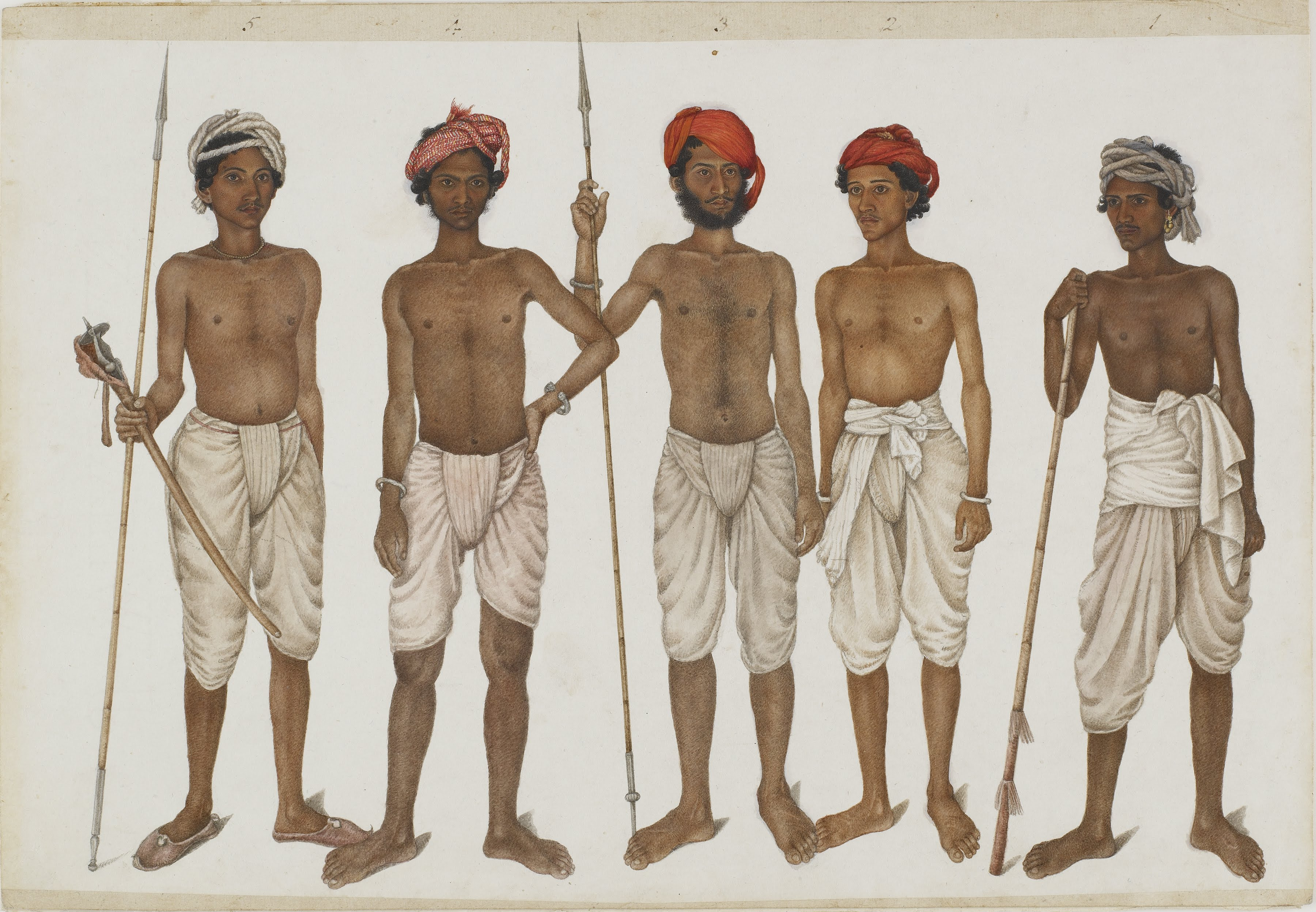
Five Recruits-Ummee Chund, Indur, Goolzaree, Bukhtawur and Juhaz, 1815–16

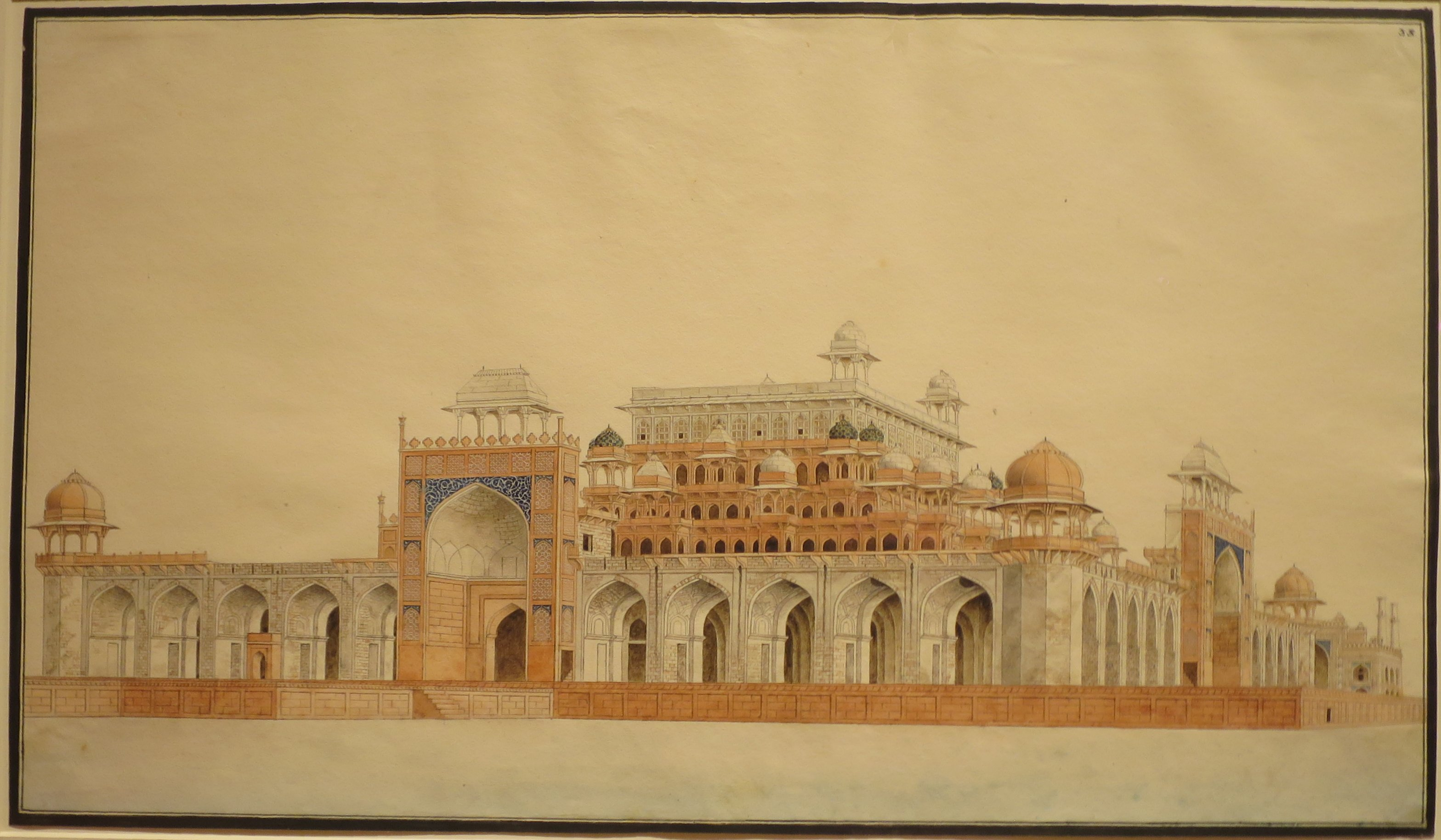
Akbar's Tomb at Sikandra, Sheikh Latif, c. 1810–1820

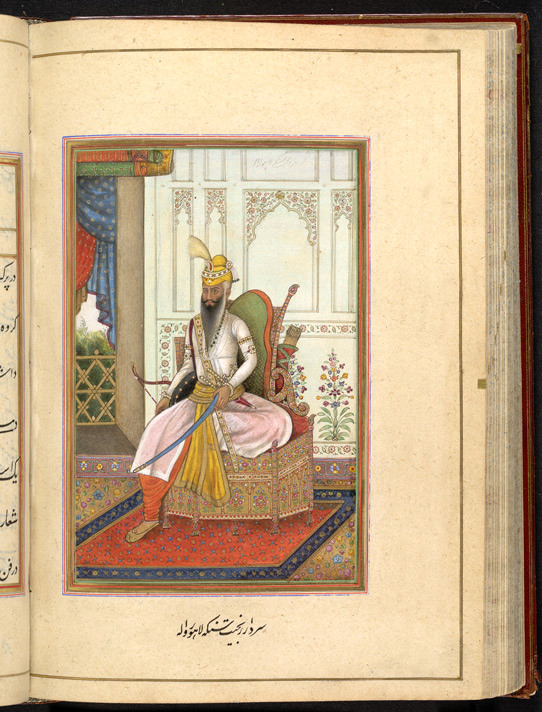
Maharaja Ranjit Singh c.1830

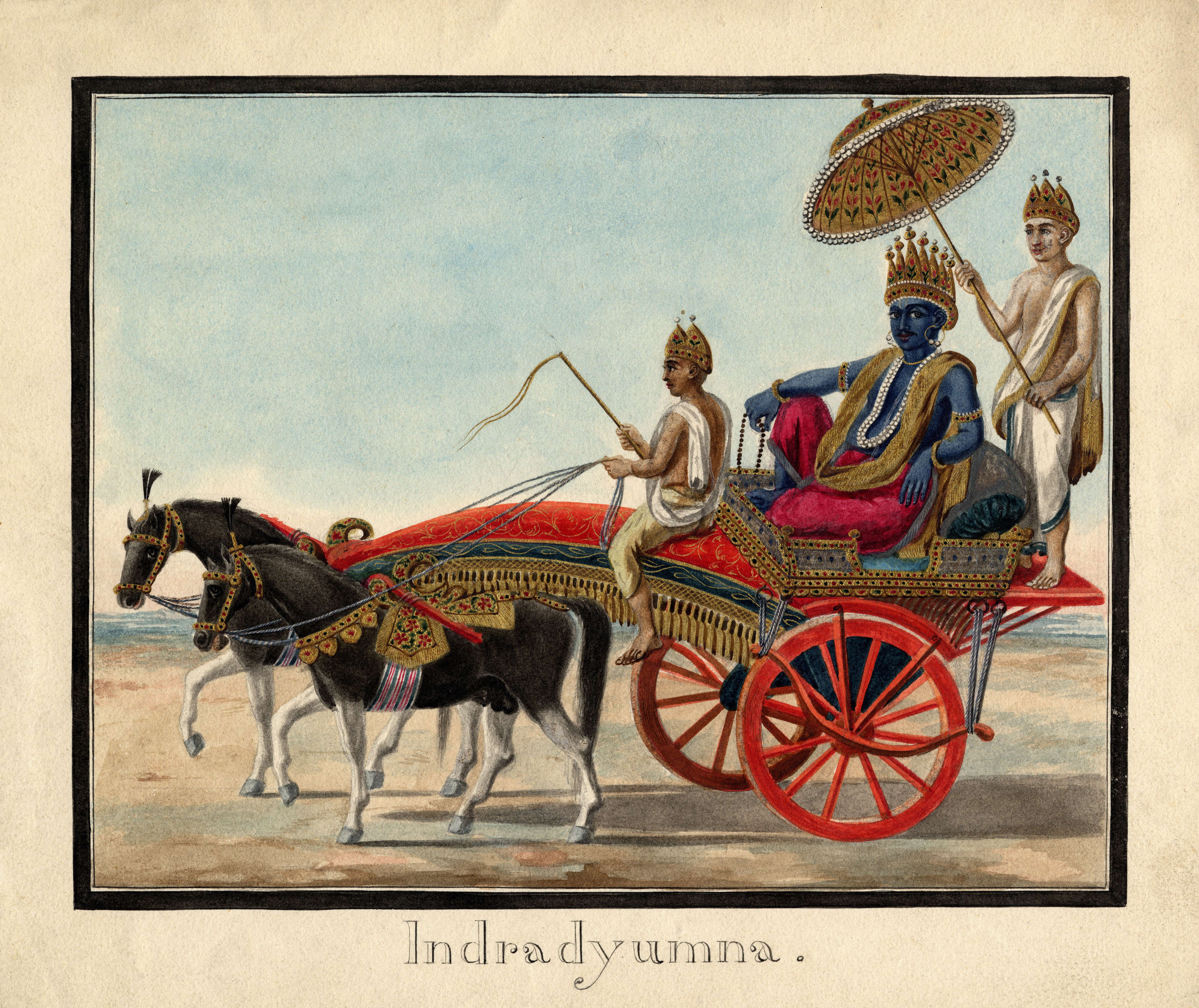
Indradyumna in a carriage, early 19th century

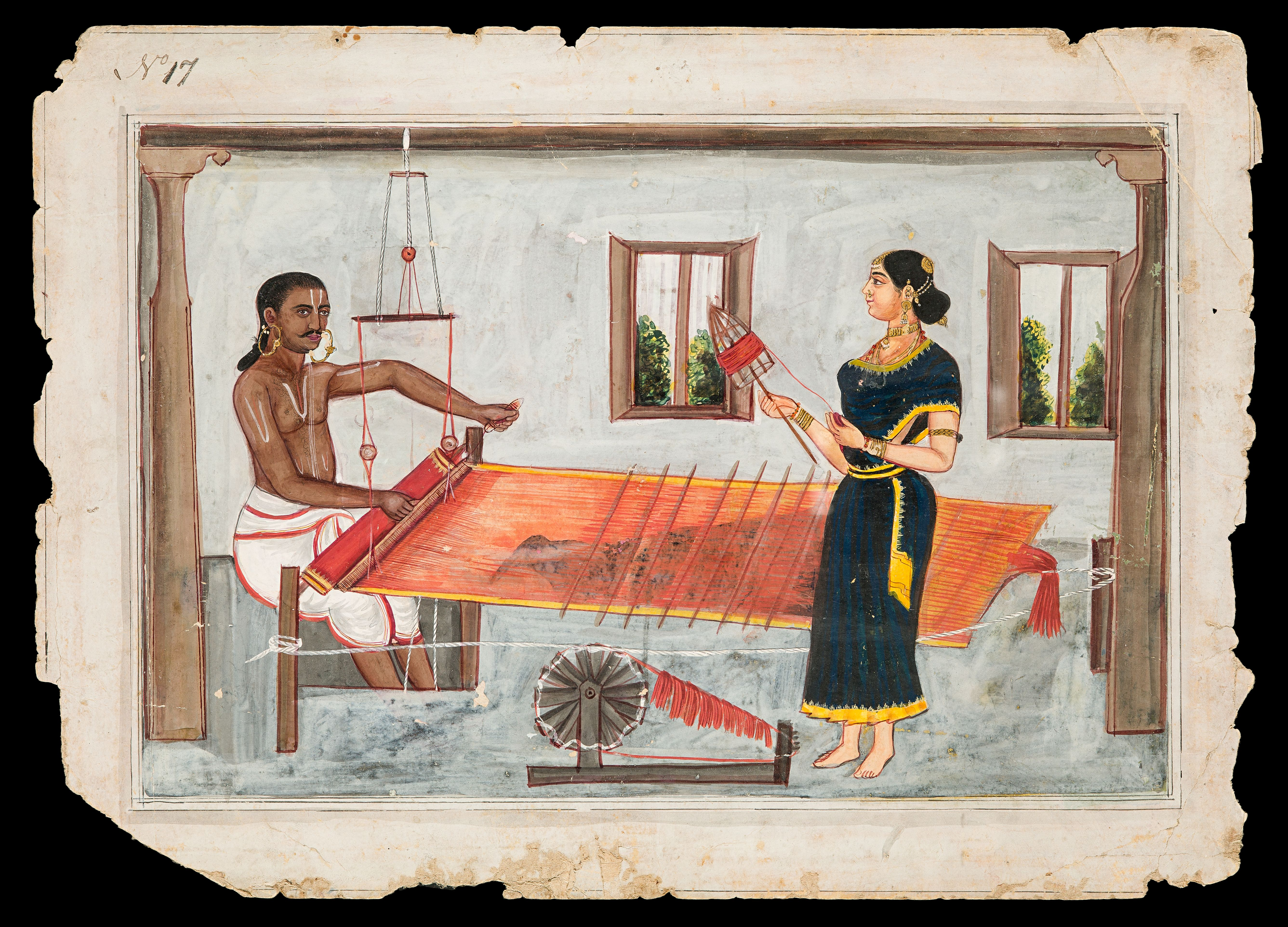
An Indian weaver and his wife, 18th century. Miniature of the Tanjore school. National Museum of Denmark, Copenhagen.
