= Black Stork in a Landscape =

18th century watercolor painting

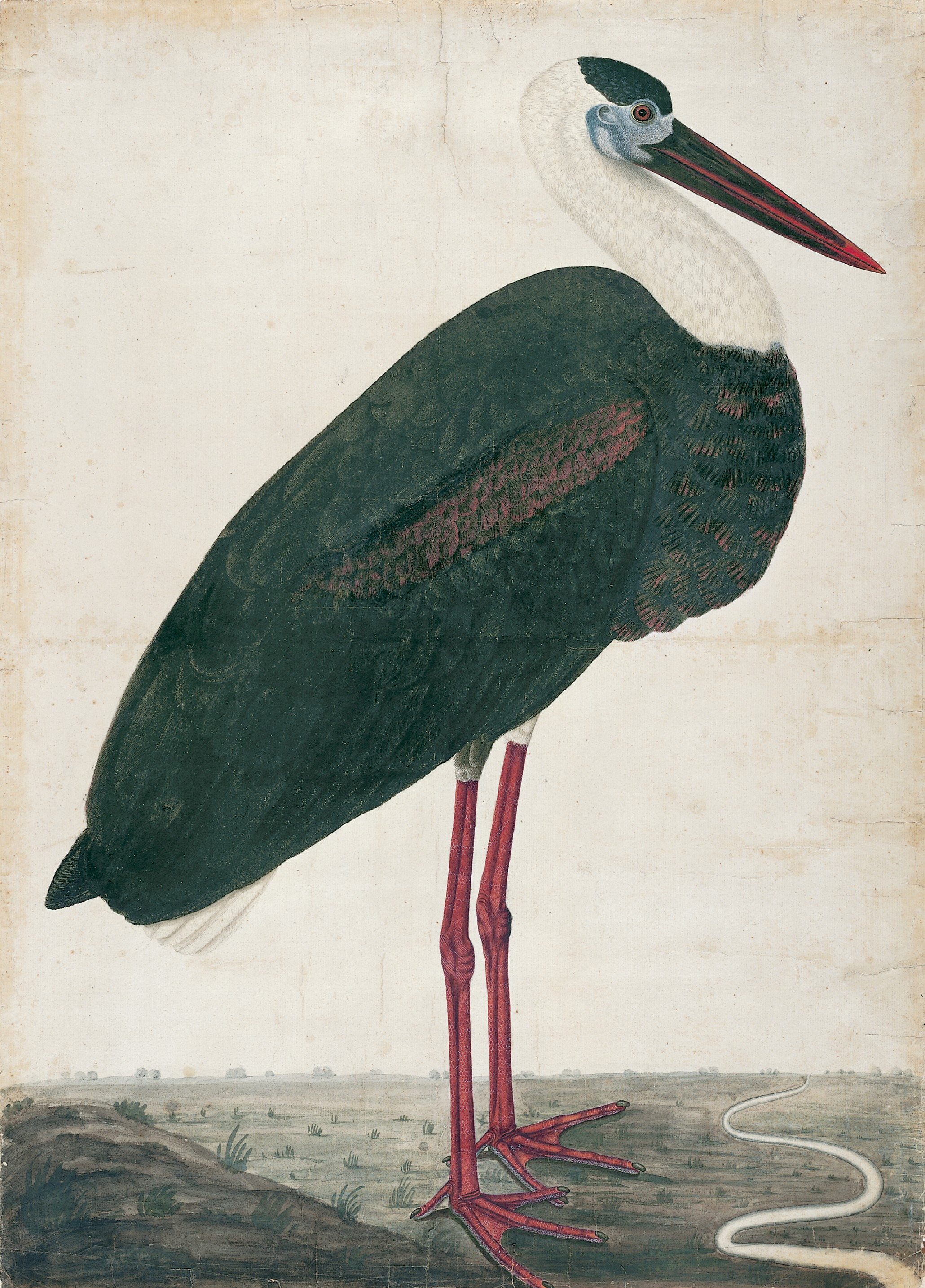
- Artist: Unknown
- Year: c. 1780
- Medium: Watercolor on paper
- Dimensions: 54.6 cm × 75.6 cm (21.5 in × 29.8 in)
- Location: Metropolitan Museum of Art

Black Stork in a Landscape is a late 18th-century watercolor painting of a woolly-necked stork, painted in India for a Western patron. The painting, which is now in the Metropolitan Museum of Art, New York, was done in watercolor on European paper, by an unknown Indian artist, in what is known as the Company style. These were paintings by Indian artists for a Western market; many showed the fauna of India.

The work is traceable to a series of 658 ornithological paintings of birds that the French-born Major-General Claude Martin commissioned for his private collection.

== Description ==
The painting depicts a Woolly-necked stork (Ciconia episcopus), a large wading bird that includes the Indian subcontinent in its range.

The way in which the painting is executed implies that the anonymous author was familiar with the Woolly-necked stork; notably, the stork is shown to be crossing its right foot over its left, the standard posture of a stork.
