= Mary Impey =

English natural historian

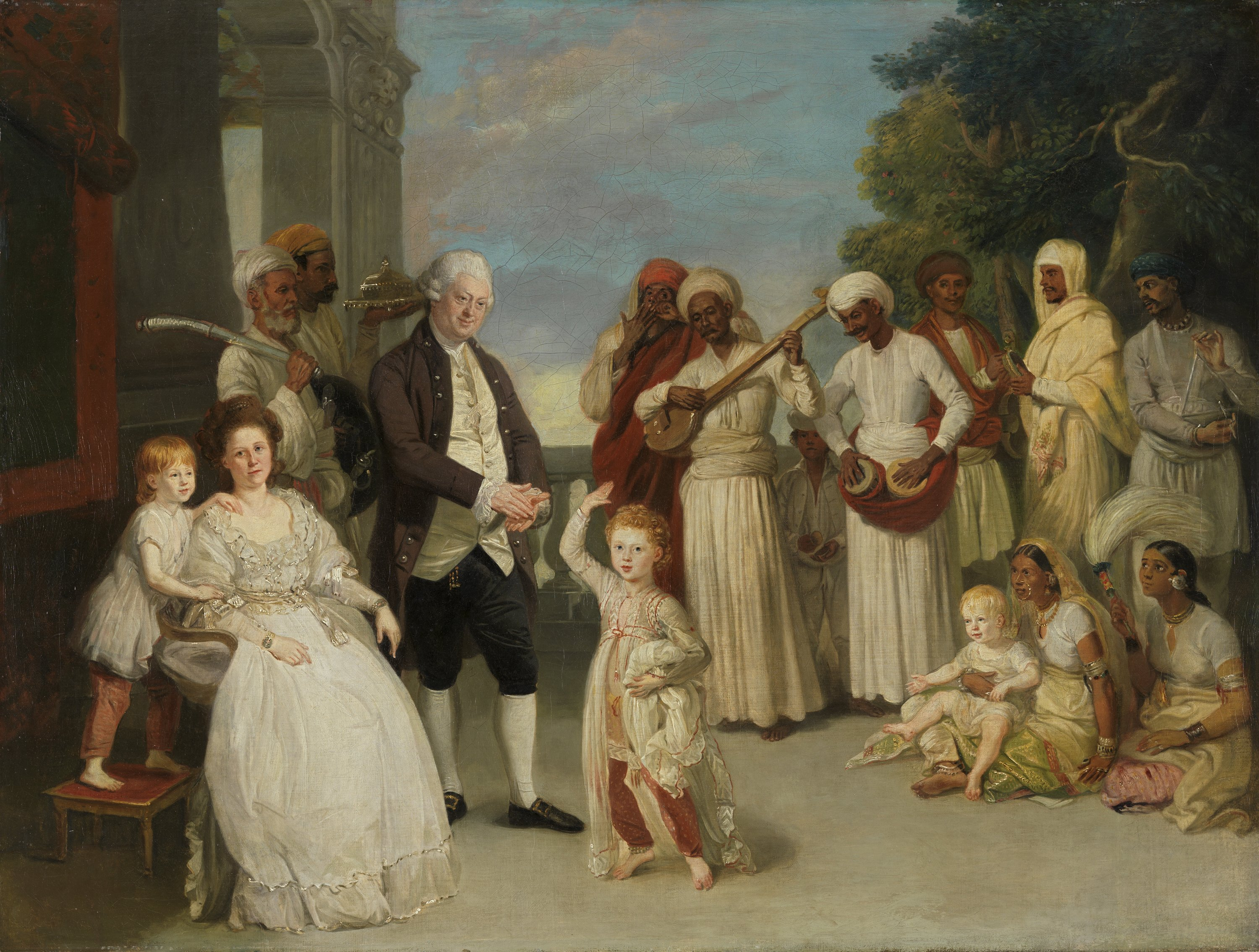
The Impey family in Calcutta, India in 1783, by Johan Zoffany. Mary's daughter, Marian Impey, is shown dancing to Indian music.

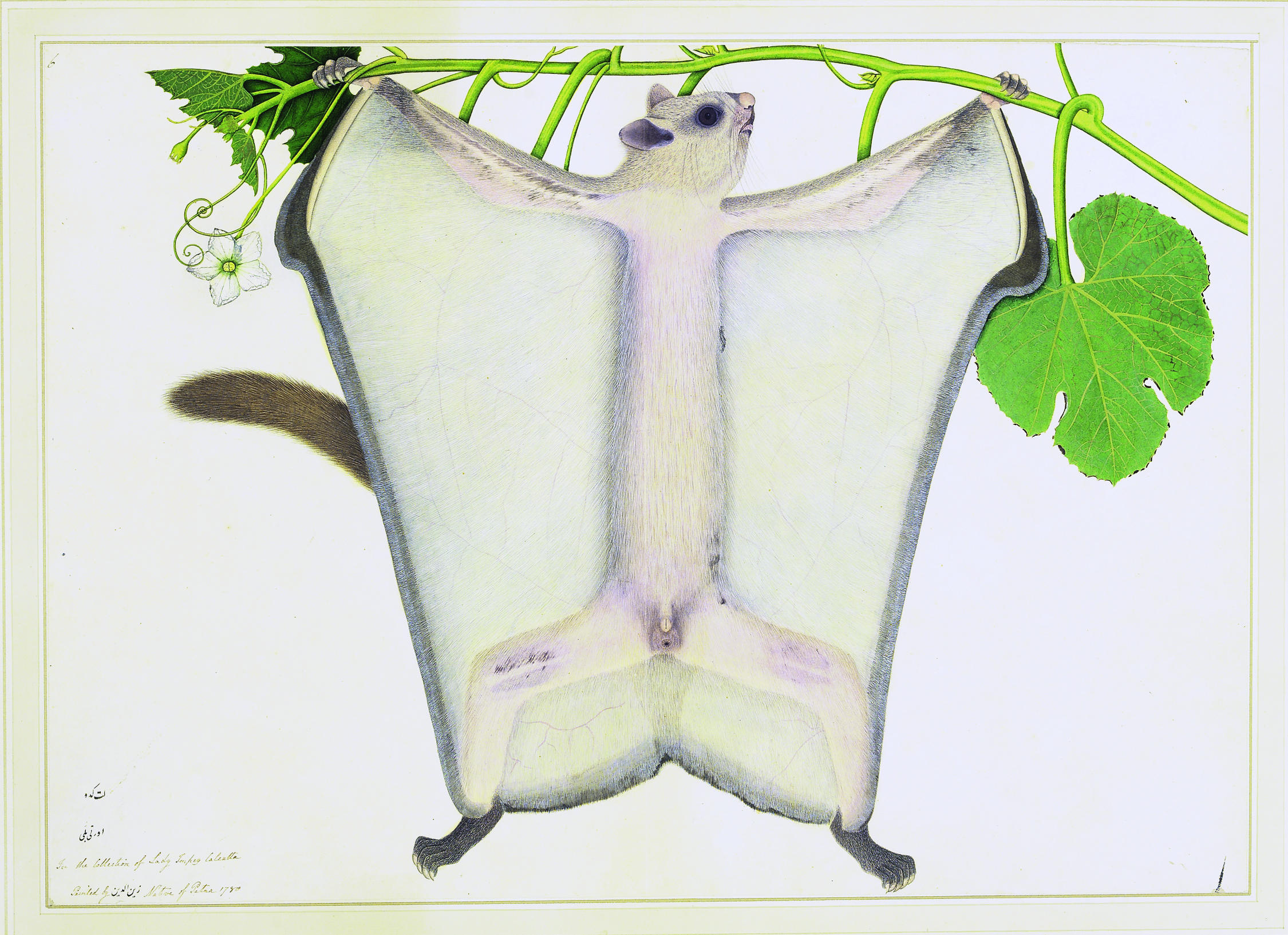
A Dwarf Flying Squirrel hanging from a Kuru Creeper, from the Impey Album, Shaikh Zayn al-Din, c. 1780, 20 7/8 in. x 29 17/32 in. (53 cm x 75 cm)

Mary, Lady Impey (née Reade; 2 March 1749 – 20 February 1818) was an English natural historian and patron of the arts in Bengal. The wife of Sir Elijah Impey, the Chief Justice of Bengal, she established a menagerie in Calcutta and commissioned Indian artists to paint the various creatures. Her paintings were later taken to England and were examined by John Latham who named several new species from them in his supplement to the General Synopsis of Birds (1787).

== Biography ==
Born Mary Reade in Oxfordshire, she was the eldest of the three children of Sir John Reade, 5th Baronet, of Shipton Court, and his wife Harriet. On 18 January 1768, at Hammersmith parish church (Fulham North Side) then just outside London, she married a thirty-six-year-old barrister, Elijah Impey, and over the next five years, bore him four children. Elijah Impey had two other children from an earlier relationship and Mary acknowledged the illegitimate children. The family lived on Essex Street off the strand until 1773.

In 1773, Elijah Impey was knighted and made chief justice of Fort William in Bengal and the couple moved to India, leaving the children with their father's brother in Hammersmith. In 1775, having settled in Fort William, Impey started a collection of native birds and animals on the extensive gardens of the estate, off Burying Ground Road (now Park Street), which had formerly been that of Henry Vansittart, governor of Bengal from 1760 to 1764.

== Paintings in India ==
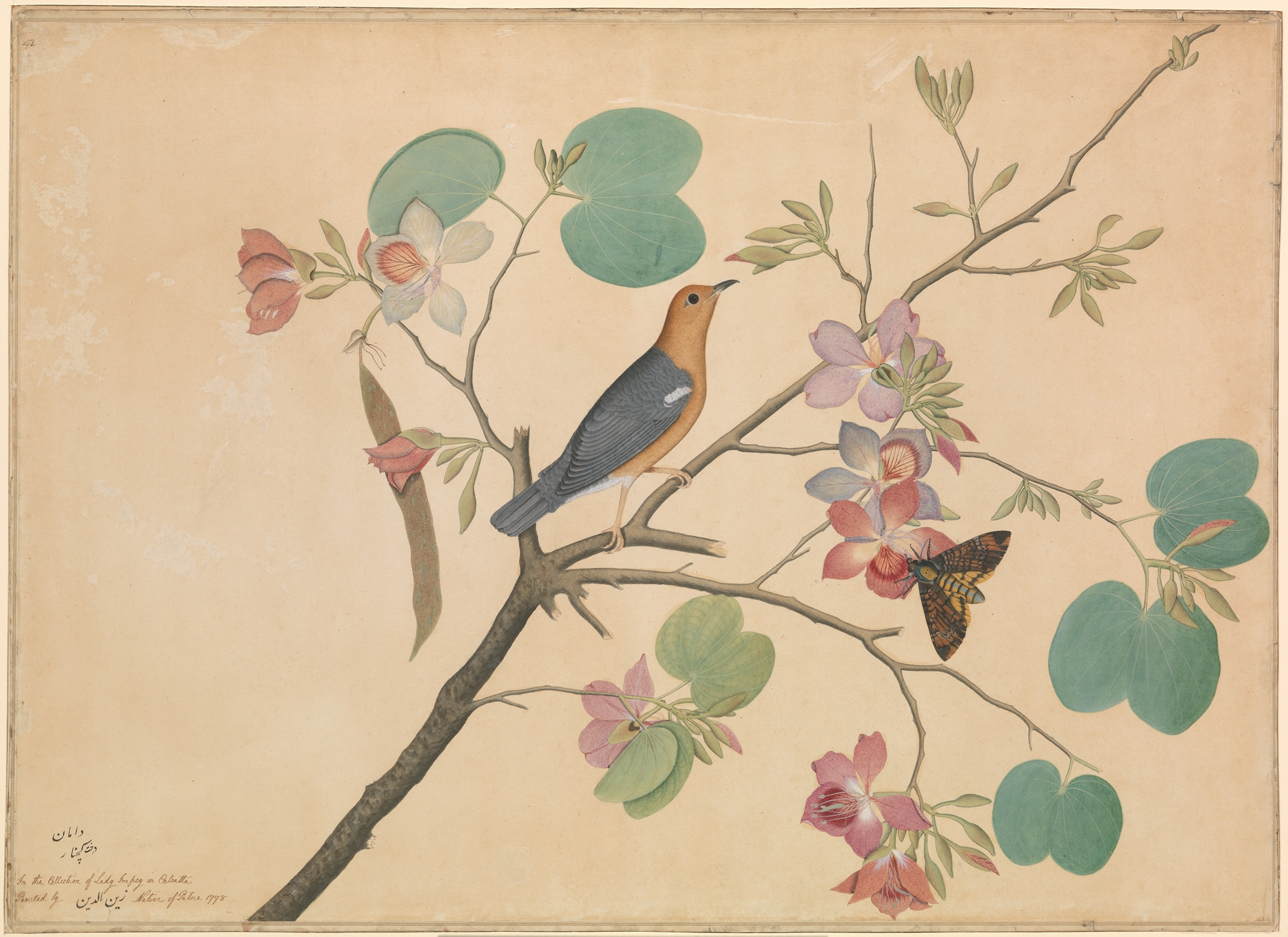
Orange-headed thrush, Geokichla citrina, one of the paintings from which Latham described the species

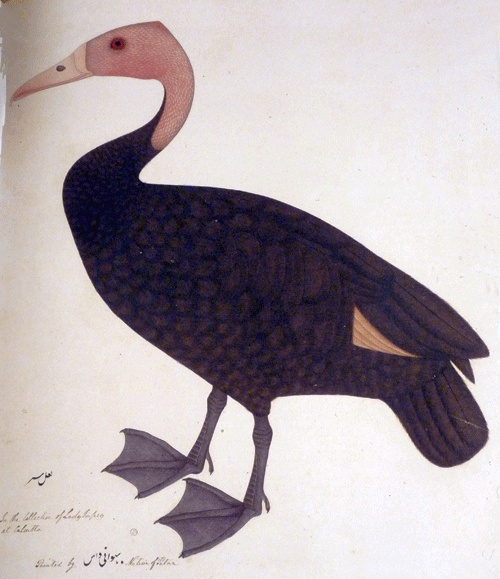
A painting of the now extinct pink-headed duck made by Bhawani Das.

Beginning in 1777, Impey and her husband hired local artists to paint birds, animals and native plants, life-sized where possible, and in natural surrounds. The paintings were made in double folios and number nearly 200. The collection, often known as the Impey Album, is an important example of Company style painting. The three artists who are known were Sheikh Zain al-Din, Bhawani Das, and Ram Das. The three known artists were from Patna where they may formerly have served under Nawab Kasim Ali. The accuracy of the paintings suggest that Lady Impey was involved in guiding the artists. More than half of the over 300 paintings made were of birds. Sir Elijah too collected manuscripts and paintings, particularly from Murshidabad and on these collections he had a personal Persian seal impressed. On the collections made by his wife, the name of the birds was inscribed in Persian and sometimes English along with the name of the artist and date. About 120 drawings were noted as being "in the collection of Lady Impey" of which a 100 are of birds. The collection was dispersed in an auction in 1810. Some of the paintings were presented to the Linnean Society of London in 1856 by daughter-in-law Sarah Impey and consisted of 47 birds, 8 mammals and 8 plants. One was framed by Lord Rothschild and is now in Tring. Many are untraced. Latham referred to at least 25 of the birds in Supplements I and II of his General Synopsis of Birds and does not refer to any of these paintings prior to 1785.

== Family ==
Between 1775 and 1783, Impey bore four more children, three of whom survived to return with them to England in 1783 when her husband was impeached. They returned to England in June 1784. She bore one more child back in England. They lived on Grosvenor Street initially, moving to Wimpole Street and finally to Newick Park, near Lewes, East Sussex. In 1801-3 they lived in Paris. Her husband died in 1809 and she died in 1818 and both were buried in a family vault at St Paul's, Hammersmith, London. They are commemorated in the church with a wall monument by Peter Rouw.

The Himalayan monal (Lophophorus impejanus) was named 'Impeyan pheasant' in her honour. A portrait of her by Thomas Gainsborough sold for 2,800 guineas (£2,940) at a Christies auction in 1904. The portrait is now in Furman University.
