= Impey Album =

Collection of Company style paintings commissioned by Elijah and Mary Impey

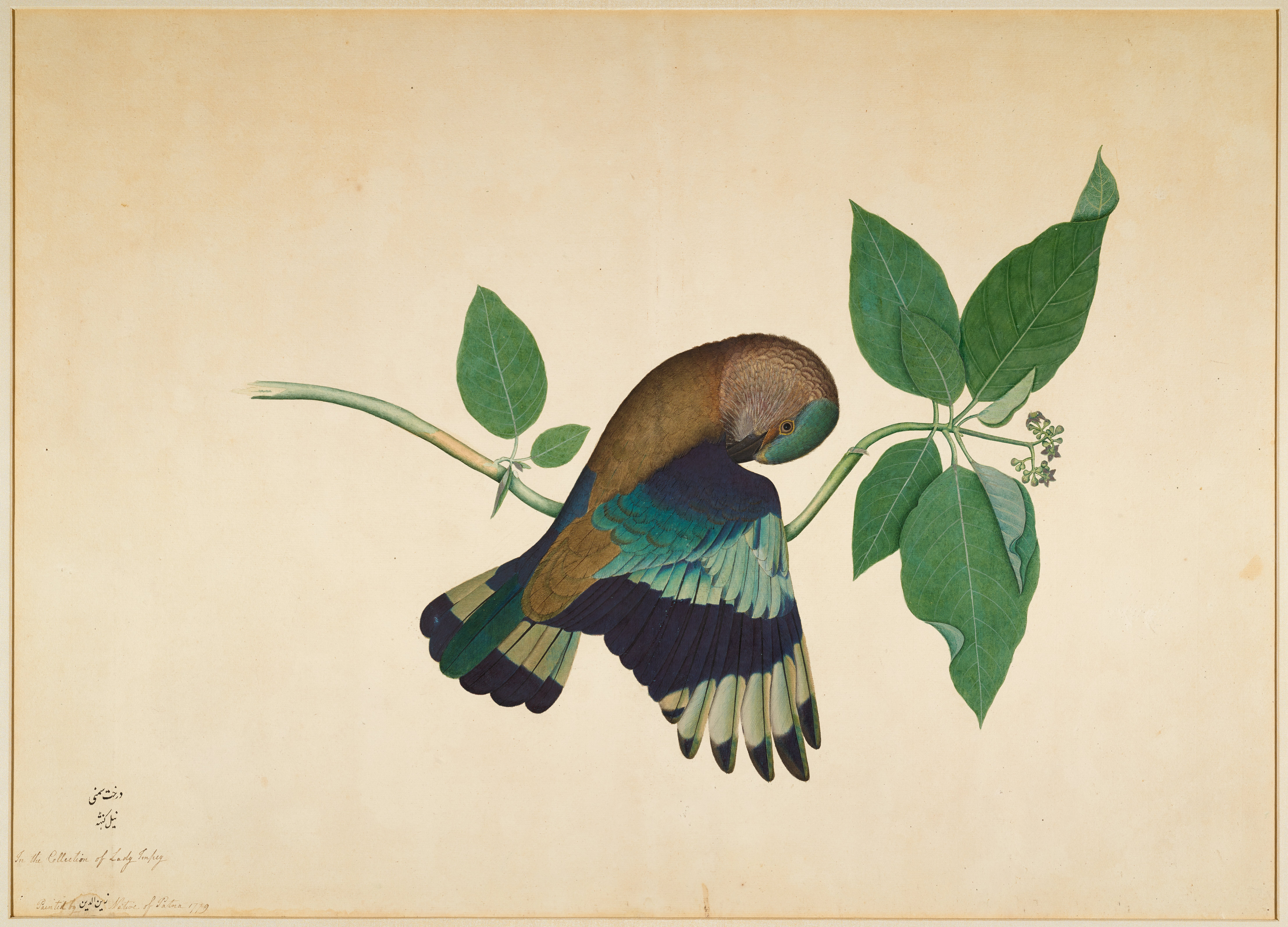
Indian Roller on Sandalwood by Zain ud-Din, now in the collection of the Minneapolis Institute of Art

The Impey Album was a collection of Company style paintings commissioned by Elijah Impey (1732–1809) and his wife Mary, née Reade (1749–1818), of the animals in their menagerie in Calcutta (now Kolkata), India, where Elijah was chief justice of the Supreme Court.

Between 1777 and 1782, the Impeys hired local artists to paint the various birds, animals and native plants, life-sized where possible, and their natural surroundings. The collection, often known as the Impey Album, is an important example of Company style painting. The three artists who are known were Sheikh Zain ud-Din, Bhawani Das, and Ram Das. More than half the over 300 paintings were of birds.

Mary also kept extensive notes about habitat and behaviour, which were of great use to later biologists such as John Latham in his work on Indian birds.

The collection was dispersed in an auction in 1810, and several pieces are in various museums including the Metropolitan Museum of Art in New York, Natural History Museum at Tring, with three in the Victoria and Albert Museum in London, eighteen in the Radcliffe Science Library of the University of Oxford, and four in World Museum, National Museums Liverpool.

The twelve pictures (eleven by Zain ud-Din) given to the Radcliffe Science Library are now on loan to the Ashmolean Museum in Oxford, and between October 2012 and April 2013 were exhibited at the Ashmolean as part of an exhibition entitled Lady Impey's Indian Bird Paintings.

An exhibition, Forgotten Masters: Indian Painting for the East India Company, which opened in December 2019 at the Wallace Collection in London reunited about 30 paintings from the album. It was scheduled to run until April 2020, but like many such events was curtailed by the COVID-19 pandemic.
