= Elijah Impey =

British judge

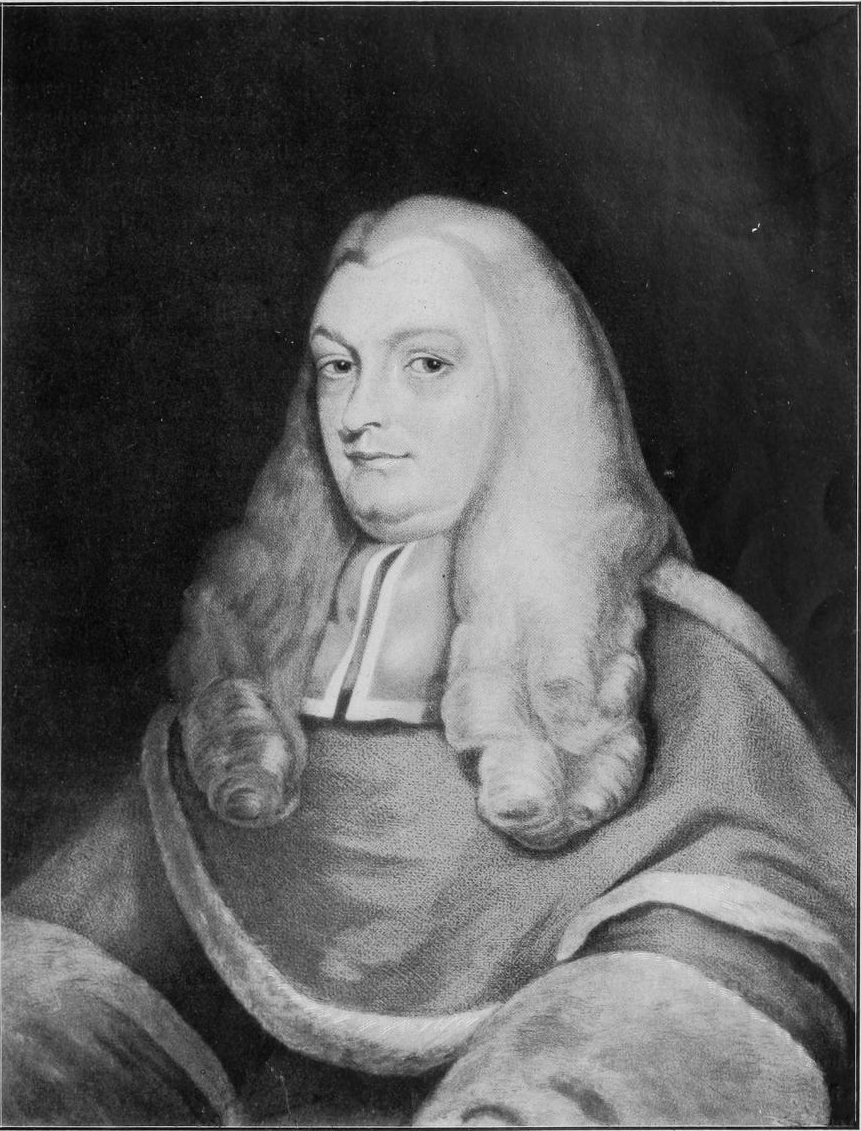

Chief Justice of the Supreme Court of Judicature at Fort William in Bengal
- In office 22 October 1774 – 3 December 1783 (Effectively). Resigned 1 November 1787

Sole Justice of the Sadr Diwani Adalat
- In office 24 October 1780 – 5 November 1782

Member of Parliament for New Romney
- In office 1790–1796

Personal details
- Born: 13 June 1732 Hammersmith, London, England, Kingdom of Great Britain
- Died: 1 October 1809 (aged 77) Newick, East Sussex, England, United Kingdom
- Resting place: St Paul's, Hammersmith, London
- Spouse: Mary Reade (m. 1768)
- Parents: Elijah Impey (father); Martha Fraser (mother)
- Education: Westminster School; Trinity College, Cambridge

Elijah Impey (13 June 1732 – 1 October 1809) was a British judge who served as the first chief justice of the Supreme Court of Judicature at Fort William in Bengal, Chief Justice of the Sadr Diwani Adalat and Member of Parliament for New Romney.

== Life ==
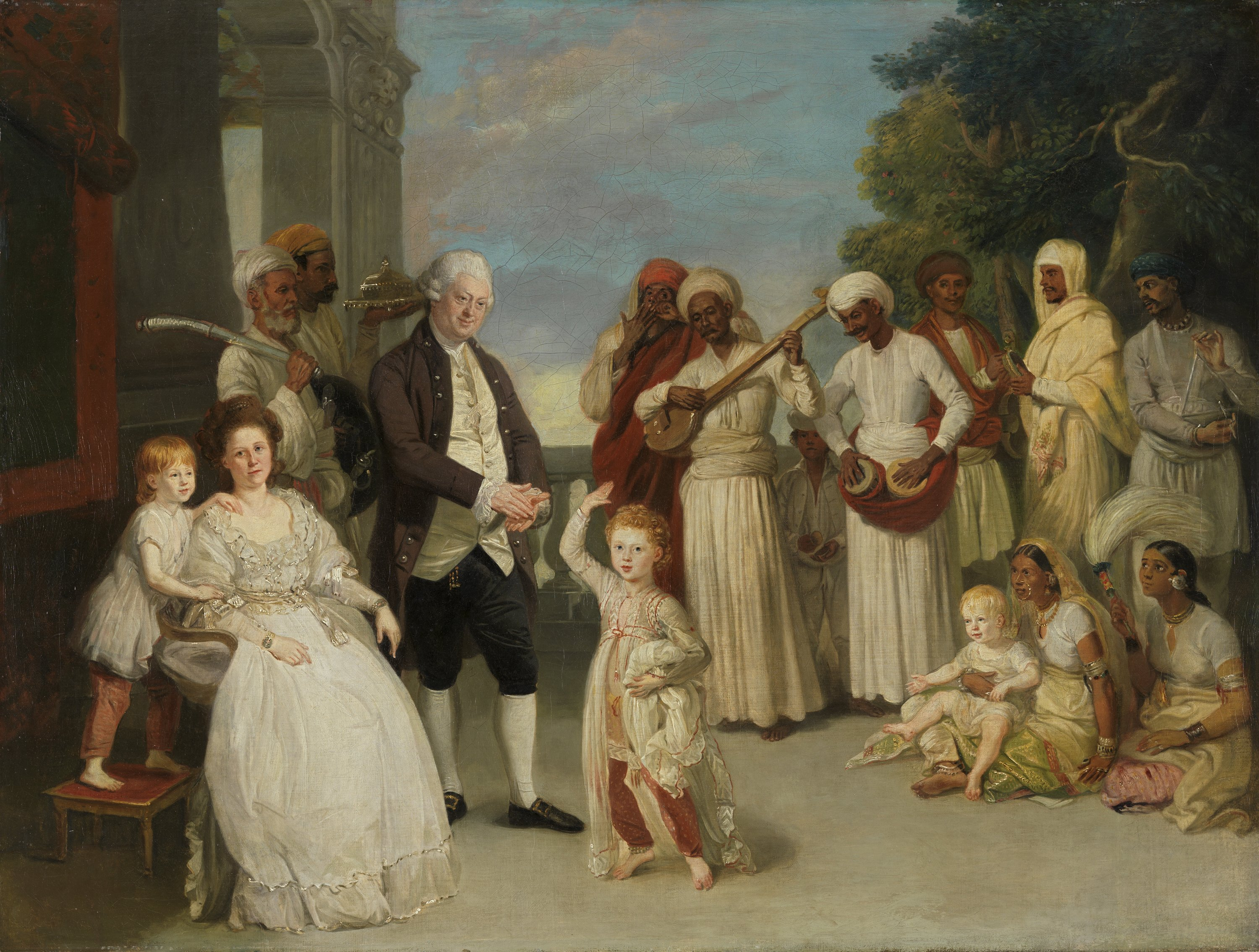
Painting by Johan Zoffany of the family of Elijah and Mary Impey in Calcutta in 1783

Elijah Impey was born on 13 June 1732 at Butterwick House in Hammersmith. He was the youngest son of merchant Elijah Impey (1683–1756) and his second wife Martha, daughter of James Fraser. He was educated at Westminster School with Warren Hastings. He was admitted to Lincoln's Inn in 1751 and proceeded to Trinity College, Cambridge in 1752, graduating in 1756 as the second Chancellor's classical medallist and becoming a fellow in 1757. He was called to the bar in 1756. He then practised law for seventeen years on the western circuit. On 18 January 1768, he married Mary Reade, the daughter of a baronet from Oxfordshire. They had five sons and two daughters. Impey also had two illegitimate children with Elizabeth Curbyshire.

In 1773 the Regulating Act reformed the government of East India Company-ruled Bengal, establishing the Bengal supreme council and a supreme court with Warren Hastings as the first governor-general. Impey was appointed the first chief justice of the new supreme court at Calcutta in March 1774 and knighted later that month. He arrived in Calcutta with the other supreme court judges in October. En route to India he learned Bengali and Urdu, and once there studied Persian. He was accompanied by his wife, who became one of the first British patrons of Indian artists. From the mid-1770s Impey and his wife hired local artists to paint the various birds, animals and native plants, life-sized where possible, and in natural surroundings. The collection is often known as the Impey Album.

Not long after Impey's appointment, the shortcomings of the newly established system created problems for the administration in Bengal. The jurisdiction of the supreme court and the powers of the council were not clearly defined, leading to disputes between the two branches. The council itself, made up of the governor-general and four councillors, was divided into two hostile factions, one supporting and the other opposing Governor-General Hastings.

In 1775 Impey became embroiled in the legal processes surrounding Maharaja Nandakumar, an Indian notable who accused Hastings of corruption. After accusing Hastings, Nandakumar himself was accused of an instance of forgery from 1769. While the accusations against Nandakumar were advanced by his Indian enemies, and there is no evidence that they were in direct contact with Hastings, they were encouraged by one of Hastings's closest friends. Nandakumar was sentenced to death under the British statute that made forgery a capital crime. Impey refused to allow a reprieve or a stay of execution. He later justified his decision by stating that this would have undermined the authority of the court because the evidence of wrongdoing was so obvious. However, there were contemporary allegations that the execution was the result of a conspiracy by Hastings and Impey. Later, these allegations were repeated by historian Thomas Babington Macaulay in his essay on Hastings, which strengthened the popular perception of Impey as a partial judge. This theory has generally been discounted by later historians, although Impey's refusal to grant reprieve or stay of execution has been criticised. It was also not clear at the time that the British statute on forgery applied in India.

In 1790 Impey was returned to Parliament as the member for New Romney constituency and spent the next seven years as an MP before retiring to Newick Park near Brighton. He died there in 1809 and was buried in the family vault at St Paul's, Hammersmith, London. With his wife he is commemorated in the church with a wall monument by Peter Rouw. He had married on 18 January 1768 Mary, daughter of Sir John Reade, 5th Baronet, of Shipton Court, Oxfordshire; they had five sons.

In 1795 his application for a fellowship of the Royal Society was rejected.

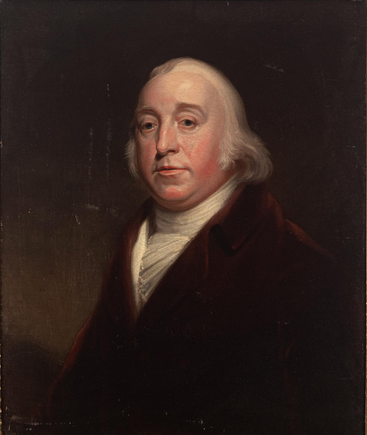
Painting by William Beechey of Elijah Impey

== Legacy ==
A portrait of Impey, by Johan Zoffany hangs in Kolkata High Court. Tilly Kettle, Thomas Lawrence and William Beechey also painted him.

His wife, Mary Impey, is commemorated in the name of the Impeyan pheasant (Lophophorus impejanus).

== Notes ==
Parliament of Great Britain
Preceded by John Henniker	Member of Parliament for New Romney; 1790–1796; With: Richard Joseph Sullivan	Succeeded by John Willett Willett; John Fordyce
