= Ghulam Ali Khan =

Indian painter (fl.1817–1852)

- Born: Delhi
- Died: c. 19th century Delhi
- Known for: Topographical paintings, portraits
- Notable work: Bahadur Shah Zafar accession portraits; Gulistan; Delhi Book; Fraser Album
- Style: Company style

Ghulam Ali Khan was a nineteenth century Indian painter in Delhi. His painting career took place over the course of more than four decades, from 1817 to 1852. He was the last royal Mughal painter, and also painted in the Company style for British patrons.

== Early life ==
Ghulam Ali Khan was born in the late eighteenth century. At this time, Shah Alam II presided over the Mughal Empire, but in 1803 the British occupied Delhi. Khan grew up and worked in a society that included Mughal and British cultures. He was the nephew of noted Mughal painter, Ghulam Murtaza Khan.

== Career ==
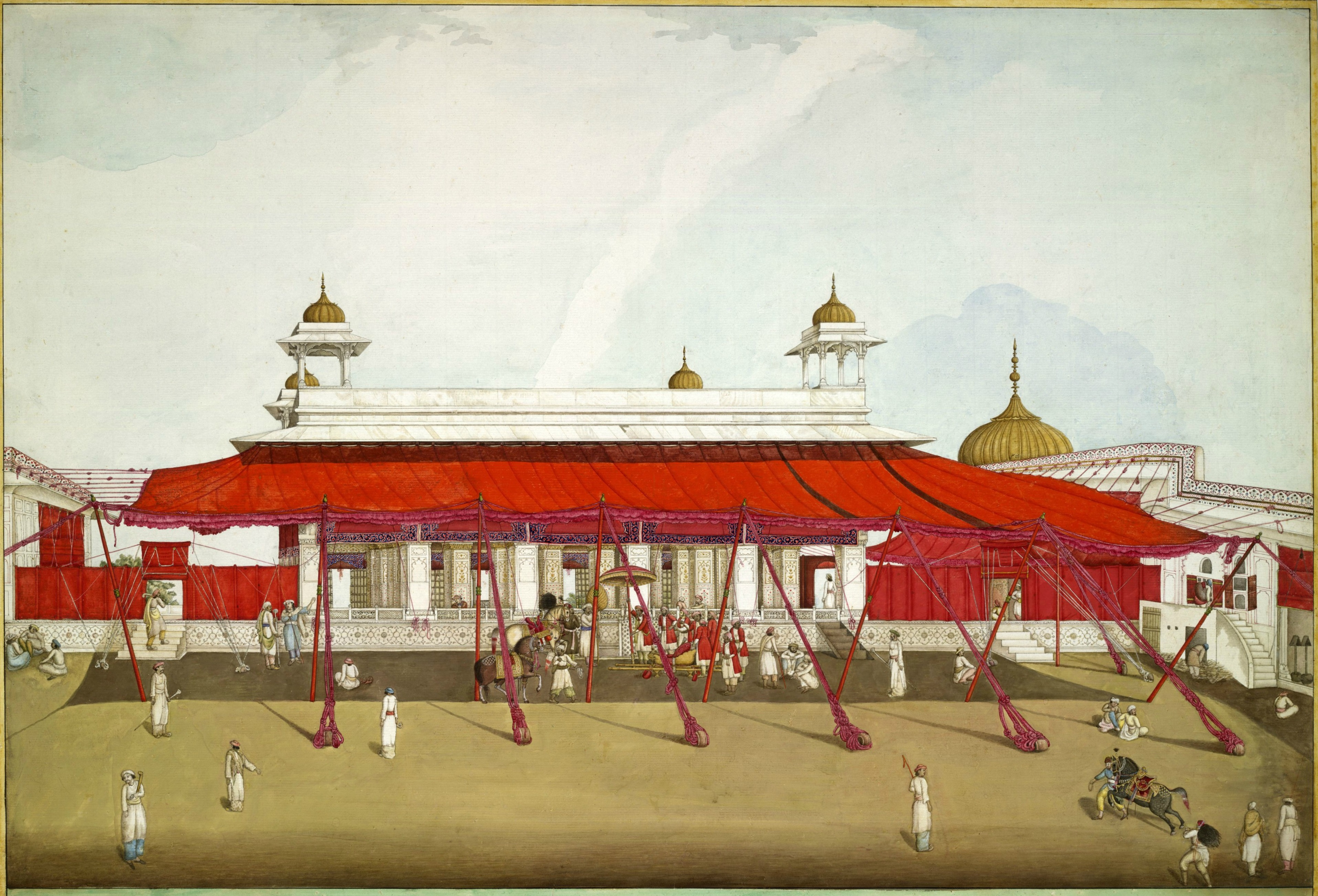
View Diwan-i-Khas, Red Fort, Delhi with red awnings or shamianas, painted by Ghulam Ali Khan in 1817

Ghulam Ali Khan was the court painter of Mughal emperors Akbar II (reigned 1806–1837 CE) and Bahadur Shah II (reigned 1837–1858 CE) in Delhi. As well as working for the royal Mughal court, Ghulam Ali Khan received commissions from British officers in the East India Company -- particularly Colonel James Skinner and officer William Fraser -- and from regional courts, such as the court of Jhajjar and Alwar. His artwork conveyed picturesque aesthetics and incorporated a Mughal painting style (such as in royal portraiture) with the more European Company Style.

=== Painting Members of the Mughal Court ===
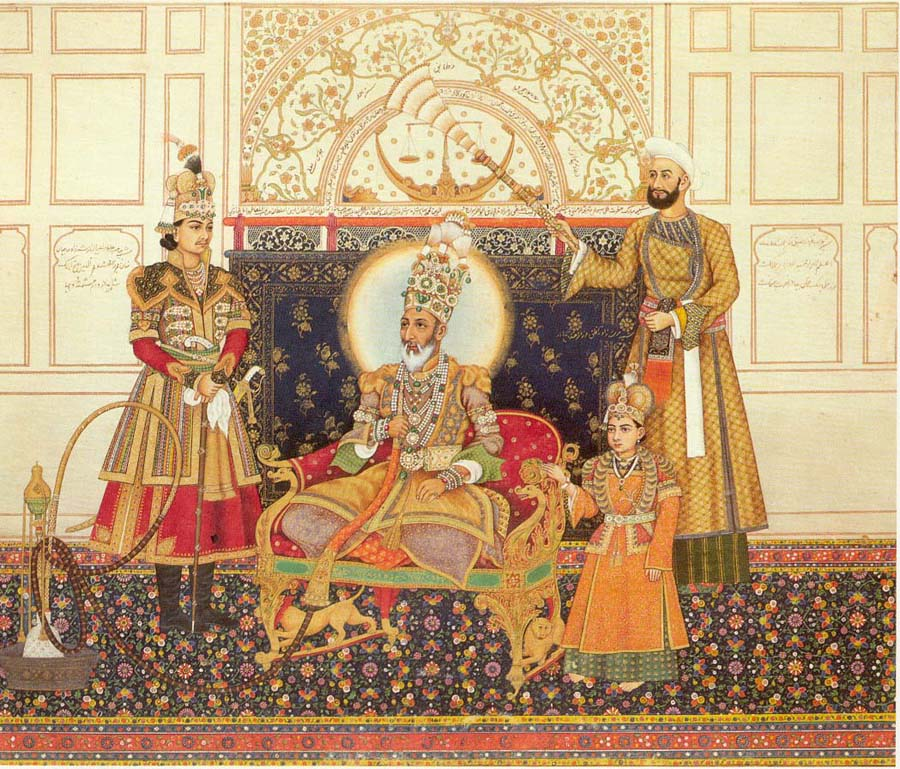
Bahadur Shah II enthroned with Mirza Fakhruddin, painted by Ghulam Ali Khan in 1837-38

In the nineteenth century there was a shift in Mughal manuscript iconography that gave greater emphasis to architectural representation. The first artwork attributed to Ghulam Ali Khan is The Diwan-i Khan in the palace in the Delhi Fort [Red Fort] from 1817. The red tent in this watercolor serves as a stand-in for the emperor in his absence. He was a formal court painter since 1827 when he produced portraits for Akbar II and his son Mirza Salim. Khan signed these two portraits as "His Majesty's Painter" and "His Majesty's devoted faithful servant." A decade later in 1837 Khan painted the accession portraits of Bahadur Shah with his sons where they are set against the backdrop of the fireplace from the Zafar Mahal. He collaborated on the Portraits of the Exalted Emperors, producing the visual imperial genealogy in 1851. Other subject matter included painting high class courtesans, tawaifs, such as those featured in Mirza Fakhruddin entertained by musicians in a salon at the Zafar Mahal, 1852.

=== Painting Beyond the Mughal Court ===
In 1827, Khan worked on a three-part painting series for Colonel Skinner memorializing portraits of Skinner's cavalry for a private album. These paintings were done in watercolor and gouache. Khan painted for Skinner again completing a portrait of the colonel in 1830. He participated in the Fraser Album project which was a collection of Delhi genre paintings.

Ghulam Ali Khan's patronage continued expanding beyond Delhi especially in the 1840s. From 1840-1853, Khan participated in the illuminating of the Gulistan (also known as the Golestan) manuscript for the Raja of Alwar. In the meantime, from 1840-1845 Khan also completed the watercolor of the Alwar gaddi for Banni Singh. He painted other commissions for the Alwar court, and he taught at the Alwar school of painting. His compositions featured the Nawab'Abd al-Rahman Khan (e.g. Nawab 'Abd al-Rahman Khan in court with the envoy of the Raja of Alwar, Capt. Alexander Heatherly, 1852) and the Nawab of Jhajjar (such as in Nawab of Jhajjar astride a pet tiger, 1849-50).

== Works ==
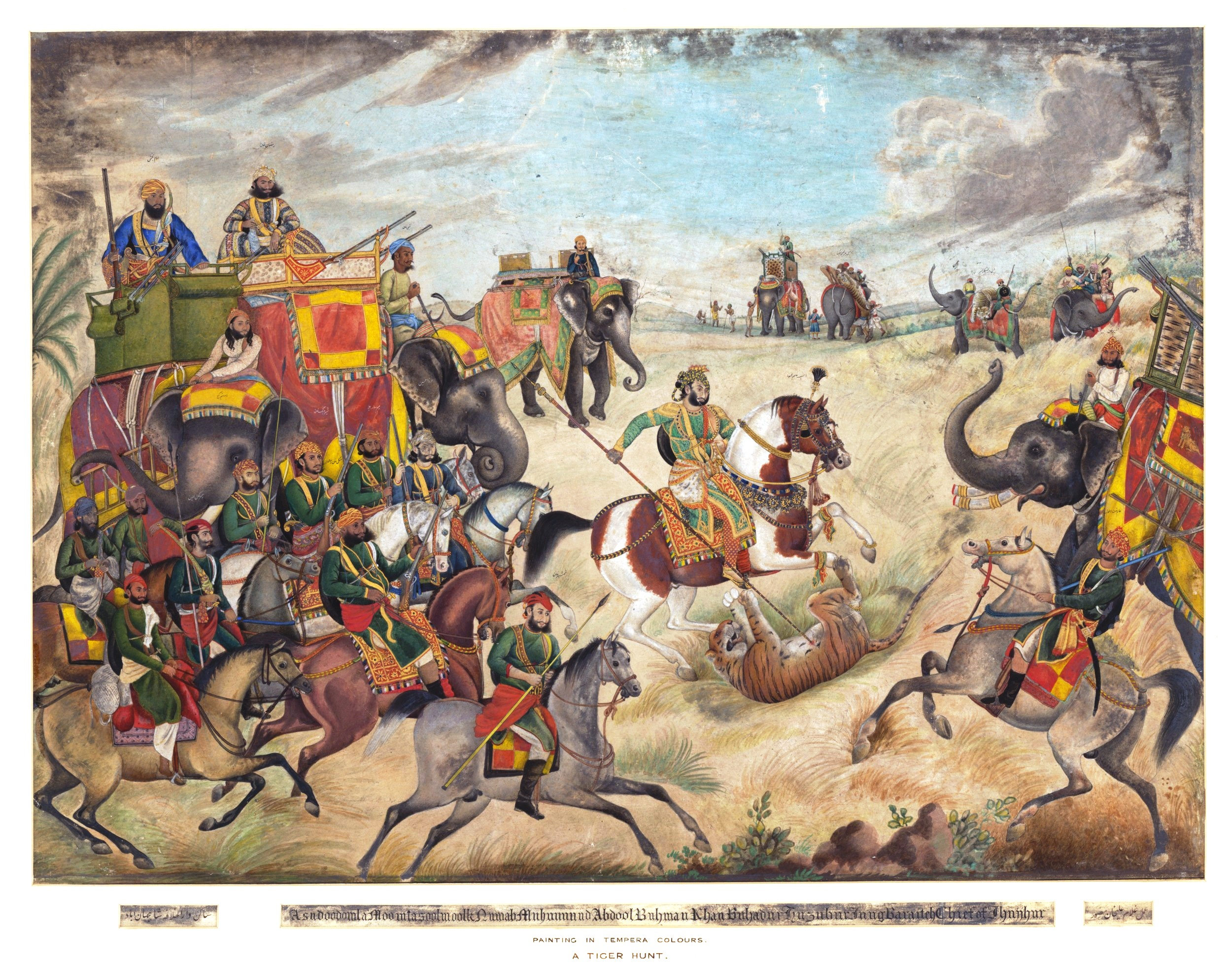
A tiger hunt, 1820 (Victoria & Albert Museum)

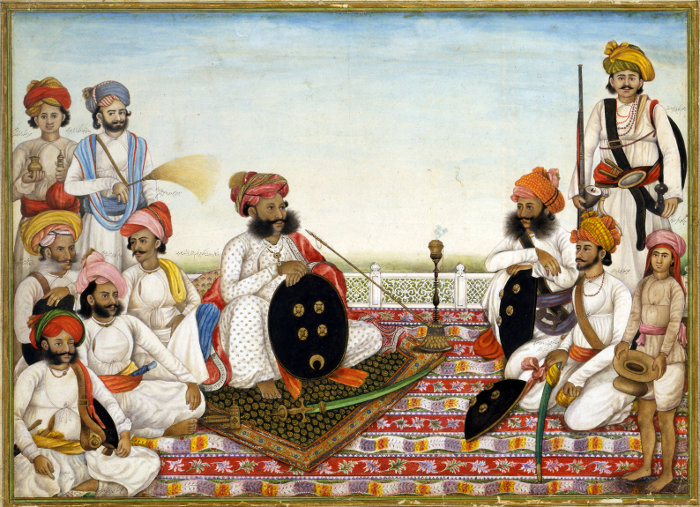
Thakur Dawlat Singh among Courtiers, 1825 (David Collection)

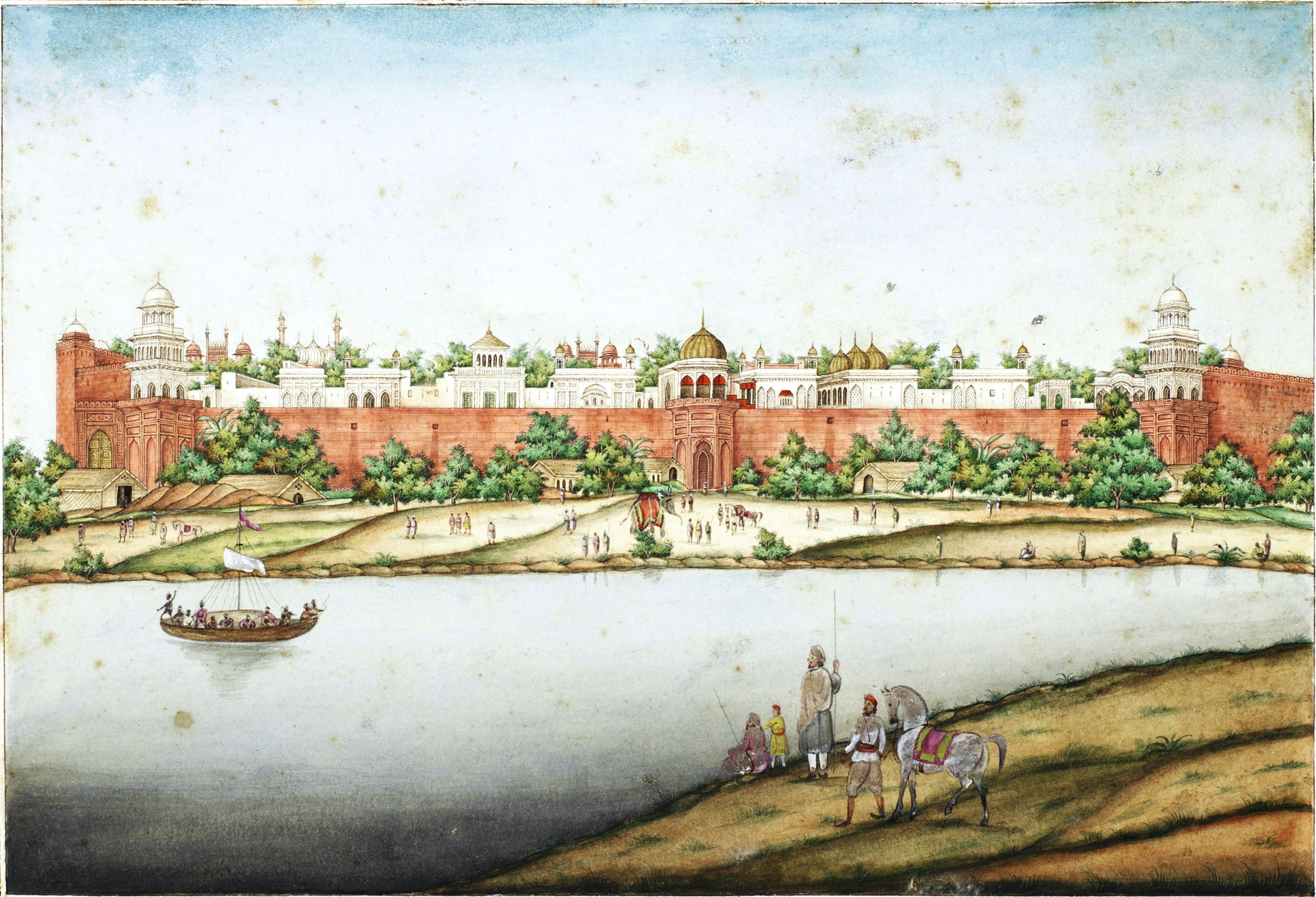
View of the Red Fort, from Sketches of The Delhee Palace & Delhee, 1854

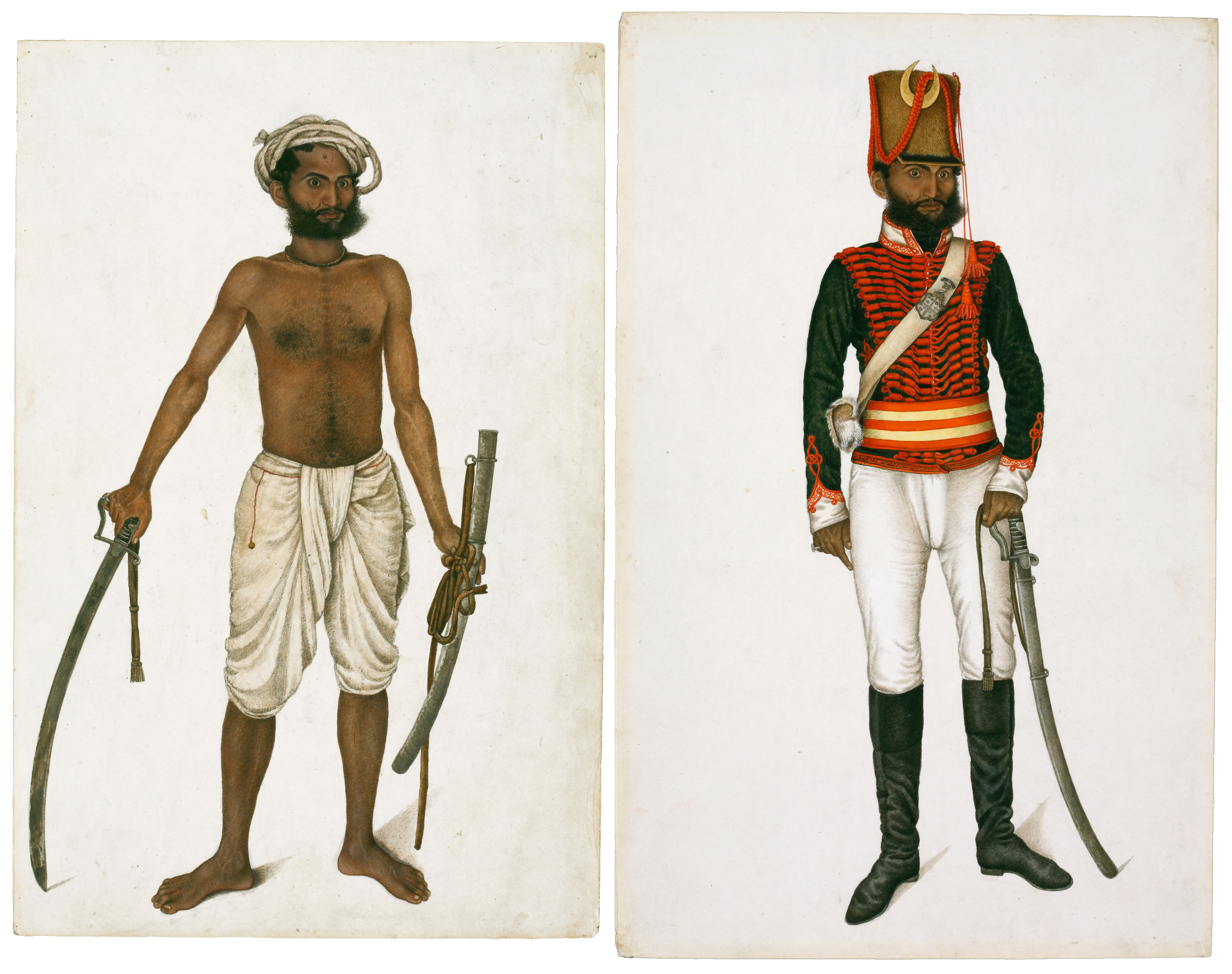
Kala, the Sepoy, with Saber Drawn and in Uniform. Two miniatures from the Fraser Album, from the workshop of Ghulam Ali Khan Family. Delhi, 1815-1816. The David Collection

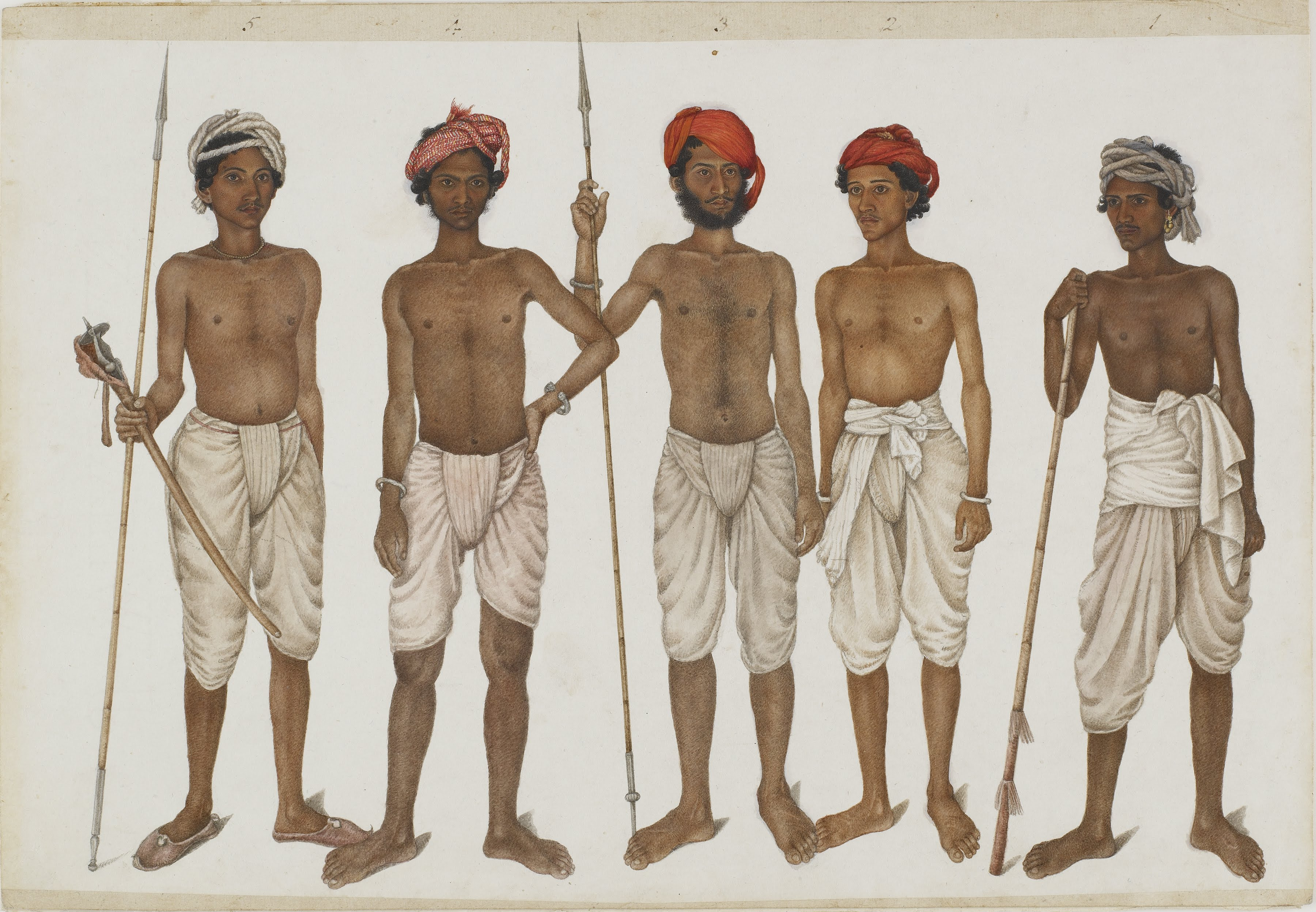
Five Recruits - Ummee Chund, Indur, Goolzaree, Kukhtawur, and Juhaz; from the Fraser Album, ca. 1816 (Freer Gallery)

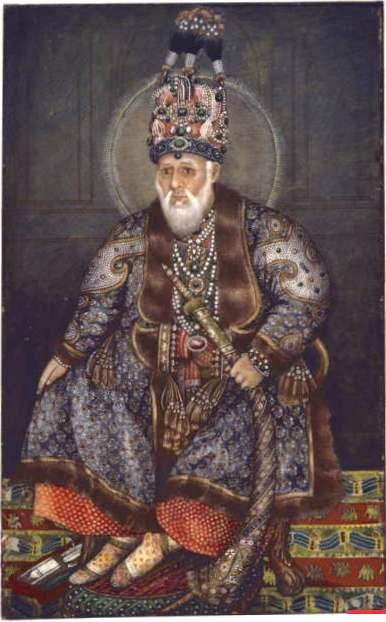
Portrait of Akbar II, 1827 (British Library)

== See also ==
- Fraser Album
- Delhi Book
