= Ghulam Murtaza Khan =

Indian painter (1760–1840)

- Born: 1760; Delhi
- Died: 1840 (aged 80); Mughal India
- Known for: portraits
- Notable work: Mughal paintings
- Style: Mughal

Ghulam Murtaza Khan (1760–1840) is a Mughal era, 19th century painter from Delhi. He worked under penultimate Mughal emperor Akbar Shah II. He worked under British officers, Skinner and William Fraser. The painting style was known as company style.

== Biography ==
Ghulam Murtaza Khan did portraits of the imperial family and was also employed by the British after they took over Delhi in 1803. His nephew was the accomplished Mughal painter, Ghulam Ali Khan, who worked on the classic, Fraser Album.

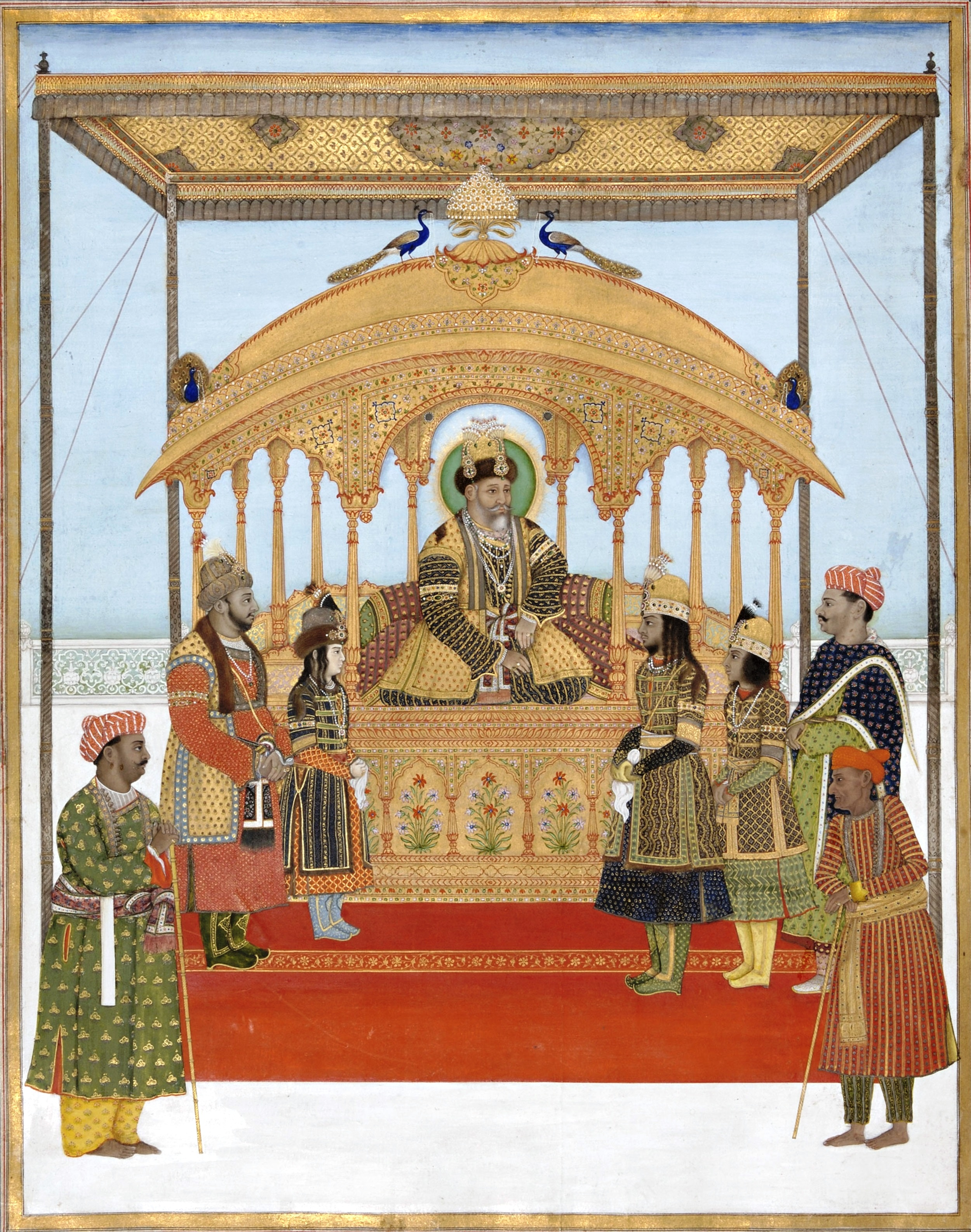
The Delhi Darbar by Ghulam Murtaza Khan

He did not change his typical Mughal style, the refined style of the seventeenth-century. His style display a restrained naturalism like the formality of compositions during the reign of emperor Shah Jahan.
