= Fraser Album =

Painting collection from William Fraser

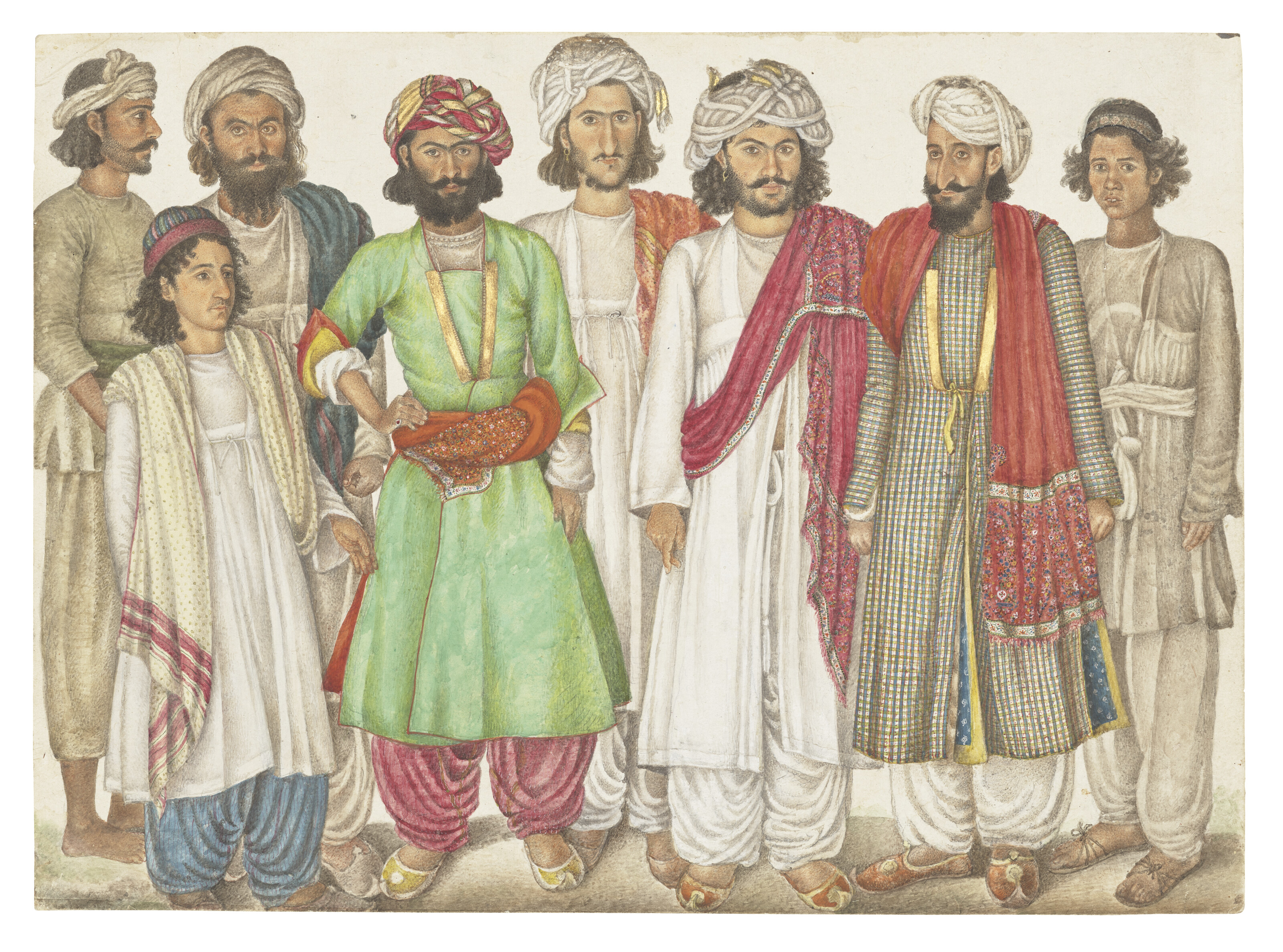
A Master of the Fraser Album, Eight Horse Merchants, c. 1816-20.

The Fraser Album is a now dispersed compilation of paintings commissioned by the British Indian civil servant William Fraser and his older brother James Baille Fraser. Its works are considered among the greatest masterpieces of Company painting. The work is an important documentation of the Mughal empire towards its end, including ethnographic, occupational, and natural studies.

== Background ==
William Fraser arrived in India in 1802, his brother James following twelve years later in 1814.

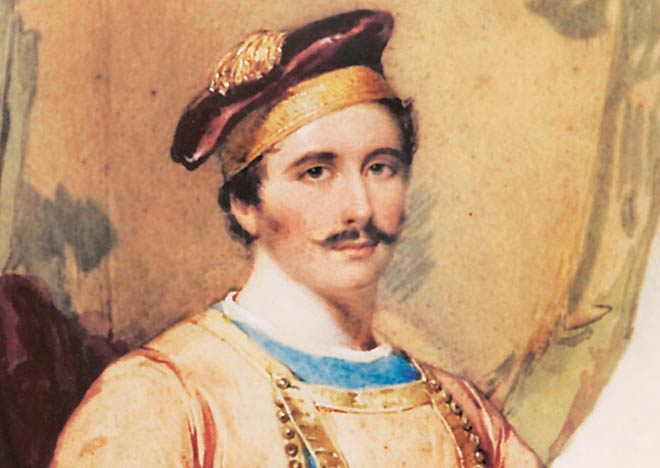
William Fraser

William likely began to hire Indian artists around 1815 to prepare maps and drawings for land and settlement work he was undertaking for the East India Company. James later wrote to William requesting a "memo of Native Drawings wished for," resulting in William routinely taking artists with him on tours.

== The Album ==
The Album was created in the Mughal muraqqa' style, folios of paintings boind together with samples of work from numerous artists and calligraphers. There are over 90 known paintings and drawings in the album, largely painted between 1815 and 1819 following William's movements around India. For instance, in 1819, William sent James a portfolio of 40 portraits, many of which James used for his own artistic interests.

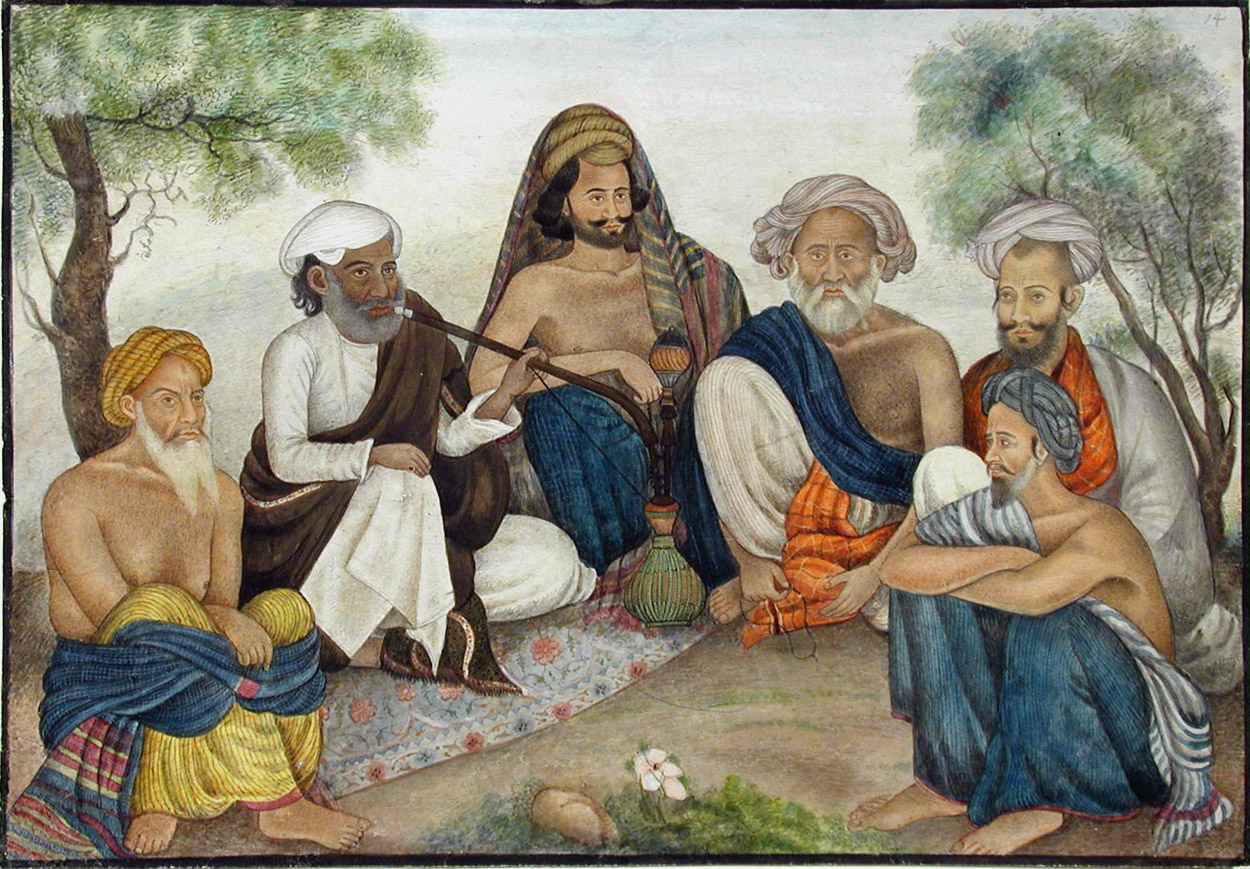
A Master of the Fraser Album, Khan Bahadur Khan with Men of his Clan, c. 1816-20.

The album is remarkable for its folios of 'type' portraits, depictions of ethnic groups that display the clothing, labours and stereotypical appearance of specific ethnicities and communities. These form a series of works of villagers, soldiers, moneylenders, Jats, Pathans, Afghan horse-dealers, Mewatis, and Sikhs.

Of the 90 known portraits, 38 were of members of Skinner's Horse, 2 are mythological and 2 are animal studies. Below each portrait is inscribed in English or Persian the names of the sitters, and in some cases the ages, and occupations.

James Fraser intended for many of the portraits to be exhibited on his return to Britain. The album was rediscovered among the Fraser's papers in 1979, bound in a red leather binding, with many images loose alongside, and would later be dispersed among private and public collections. The first, loose images appeared in a sale with Sotheby's on the 7th of July, 1980. The bound images were sold with Sotheby's New York on the 9th of December 1980.

== Artists and Style ==
Several Indian artists based in Delhi worked on paintings in the Fraser Album, but remain unknown. However, works can be attributed by style to Ghulam Ali Khan. Another artist who produced portraits for the album was Lallji (alternatively Lalljee), mentioned in the letters of James Baille Fraser as a former pupil of Johann Zoffany.

The albums artworks are praised for their sharp delineation of detail, often displaying figures against a plain white background. The works sensitively blend Mughal visual motifs with Western naturalism, particularly in their treatment of group scenes and depictions of religious figures.

== Gallery ==
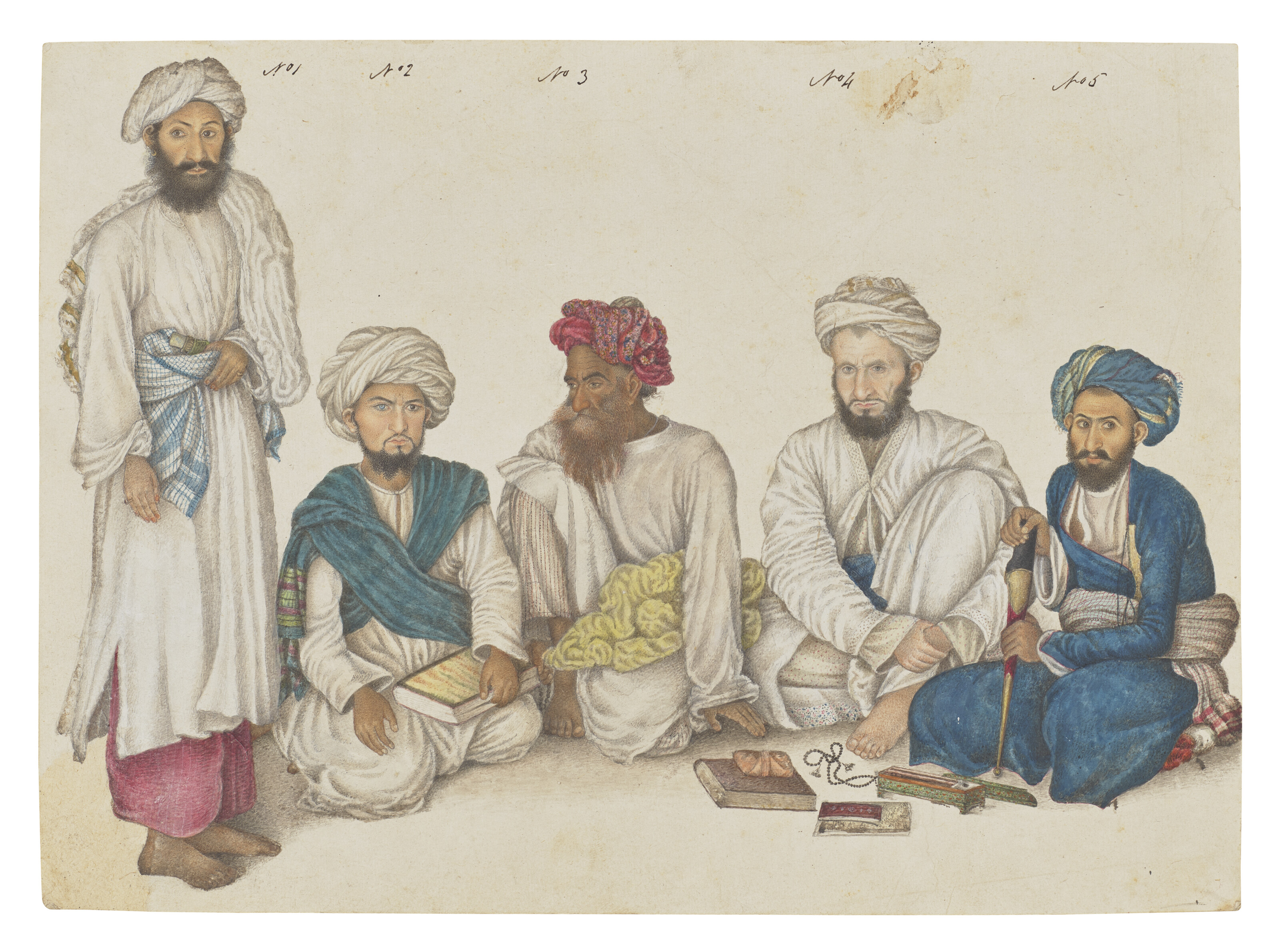
A Master of the Fraser Album, Five Tribesmen, c. 1816-20.

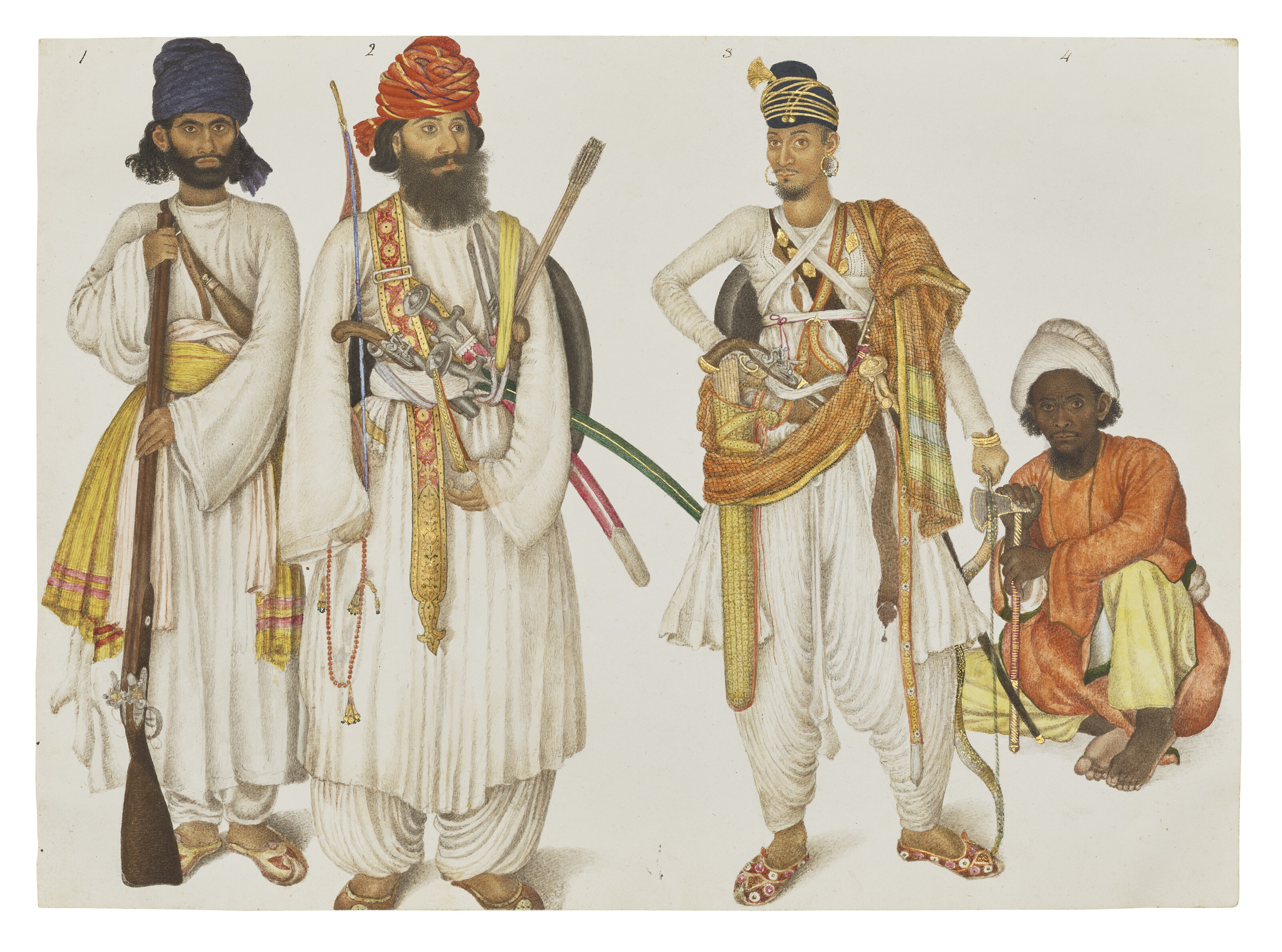
A Master of the Fraser Album, Four Tribesmen, c. 1816-20

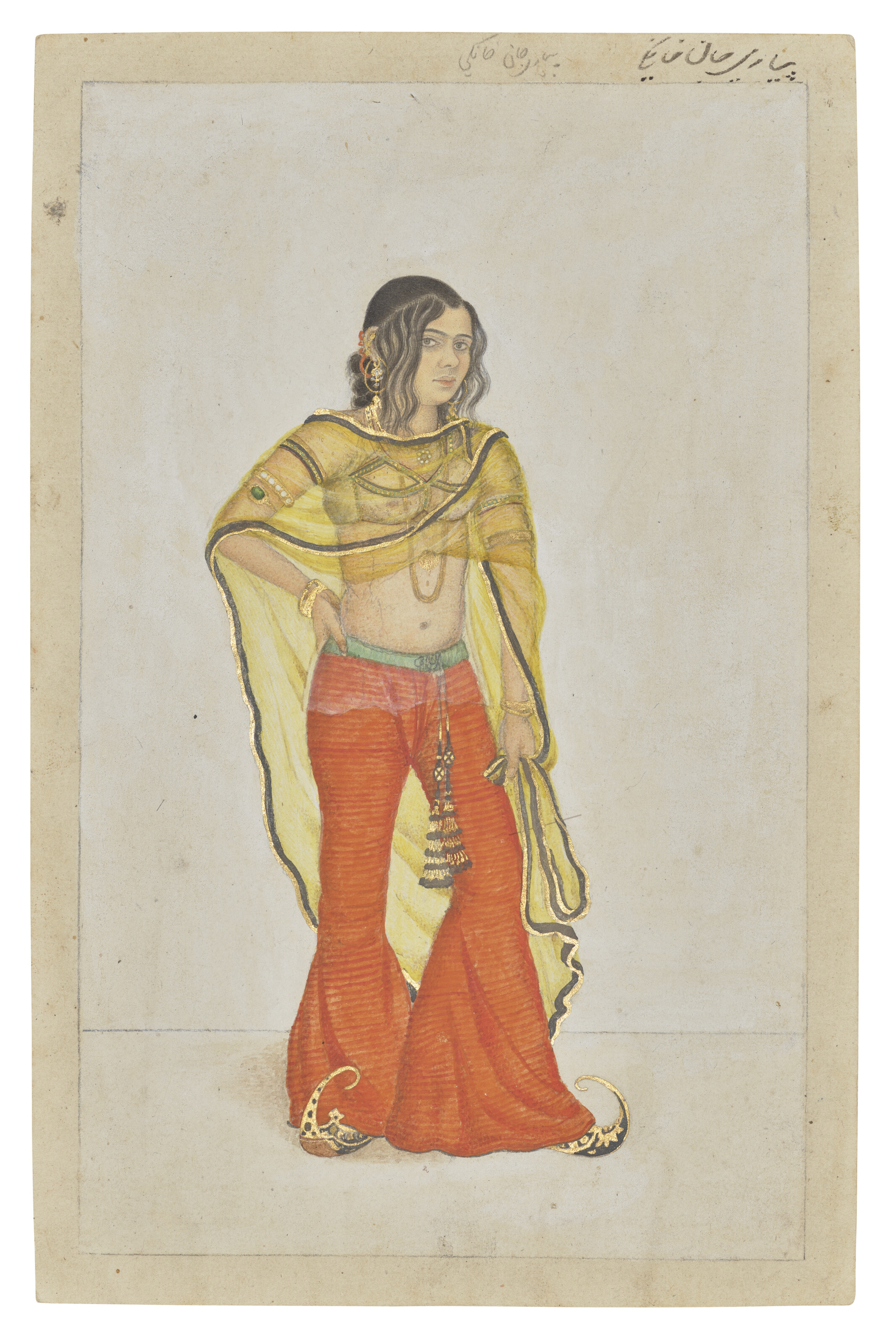
A Master of the Fraser Album, Portrait of Peearee Jan (Pari Khan), c. 1815.

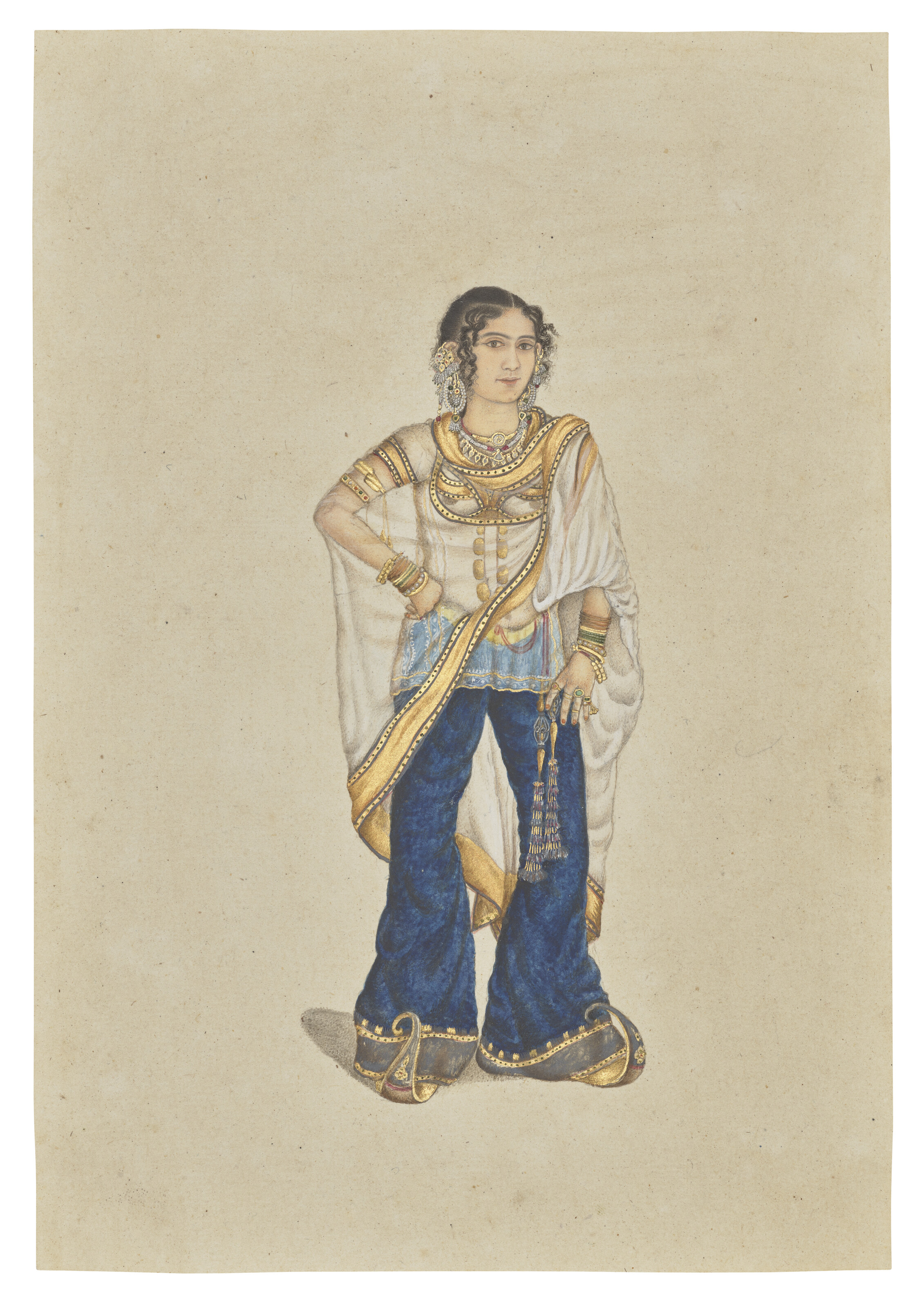
A Master of the Fraser Album, Portrait of Kandar Bakhsh, c. 1815.

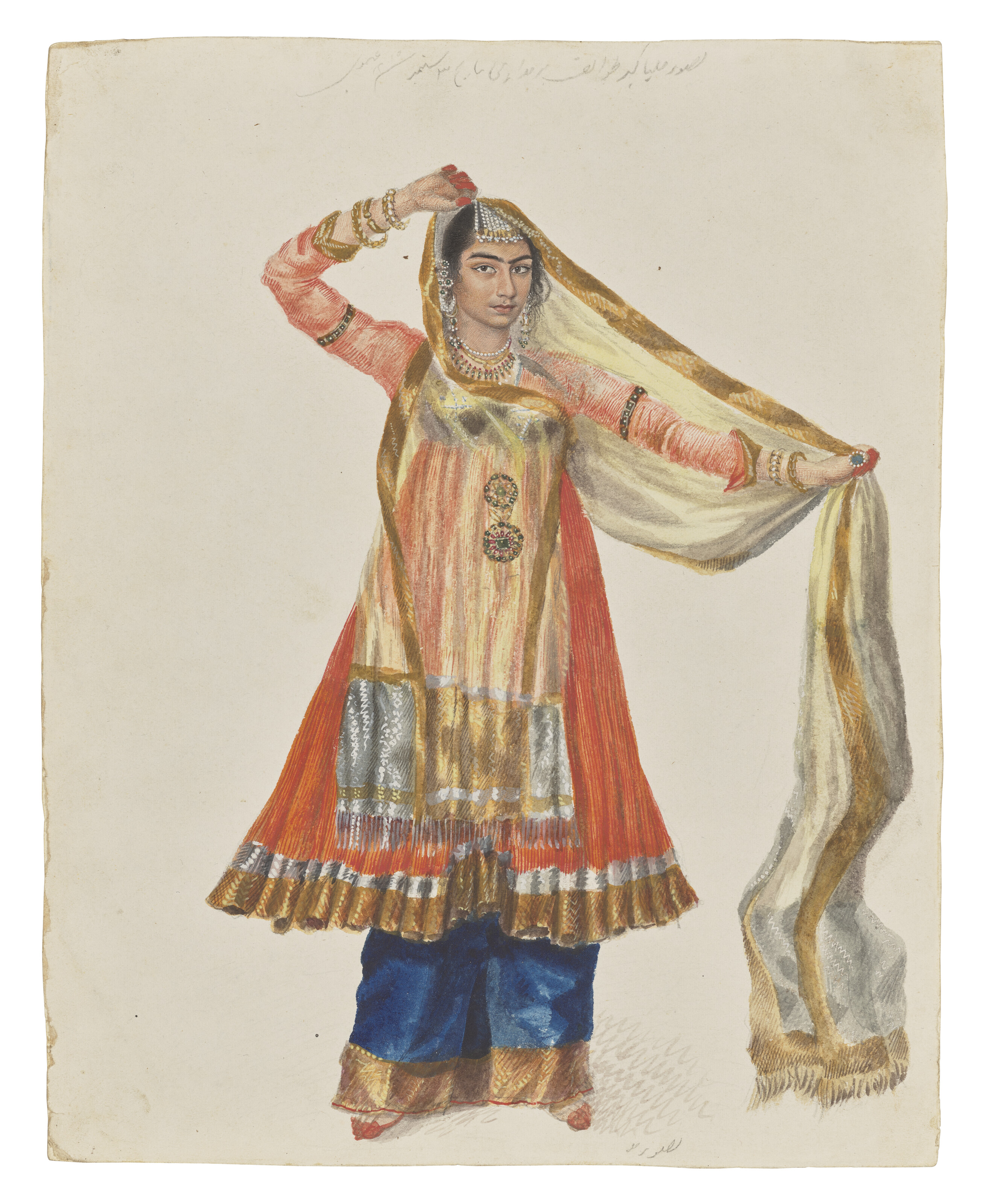
Attributed to Lalji, Malaguire in her Nautch Dress, dated 3 September 1815.

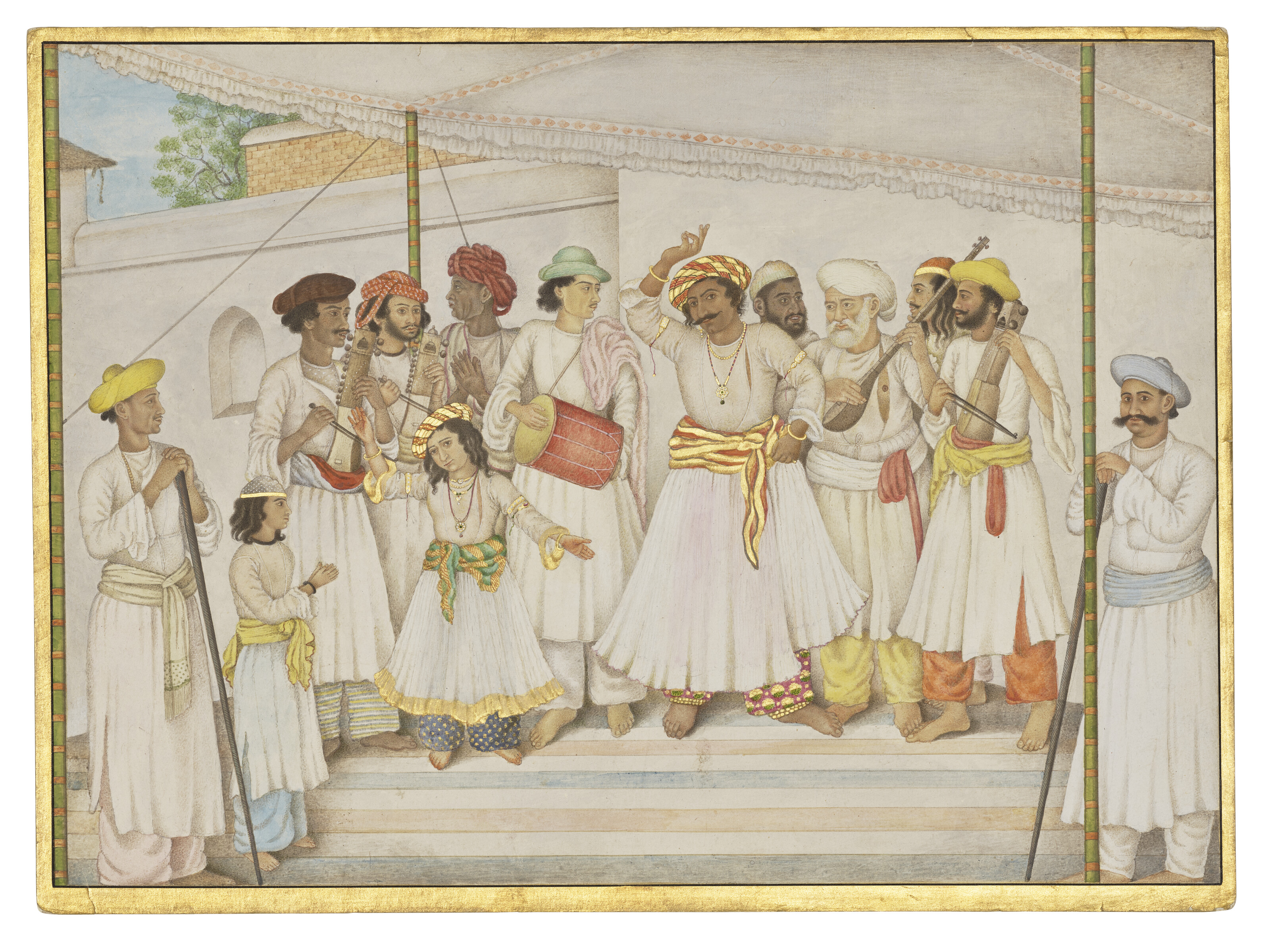
A Master of the Fraser Album, A Storyteller Performing with Musicians and Male Dancers, c. 1816-20.

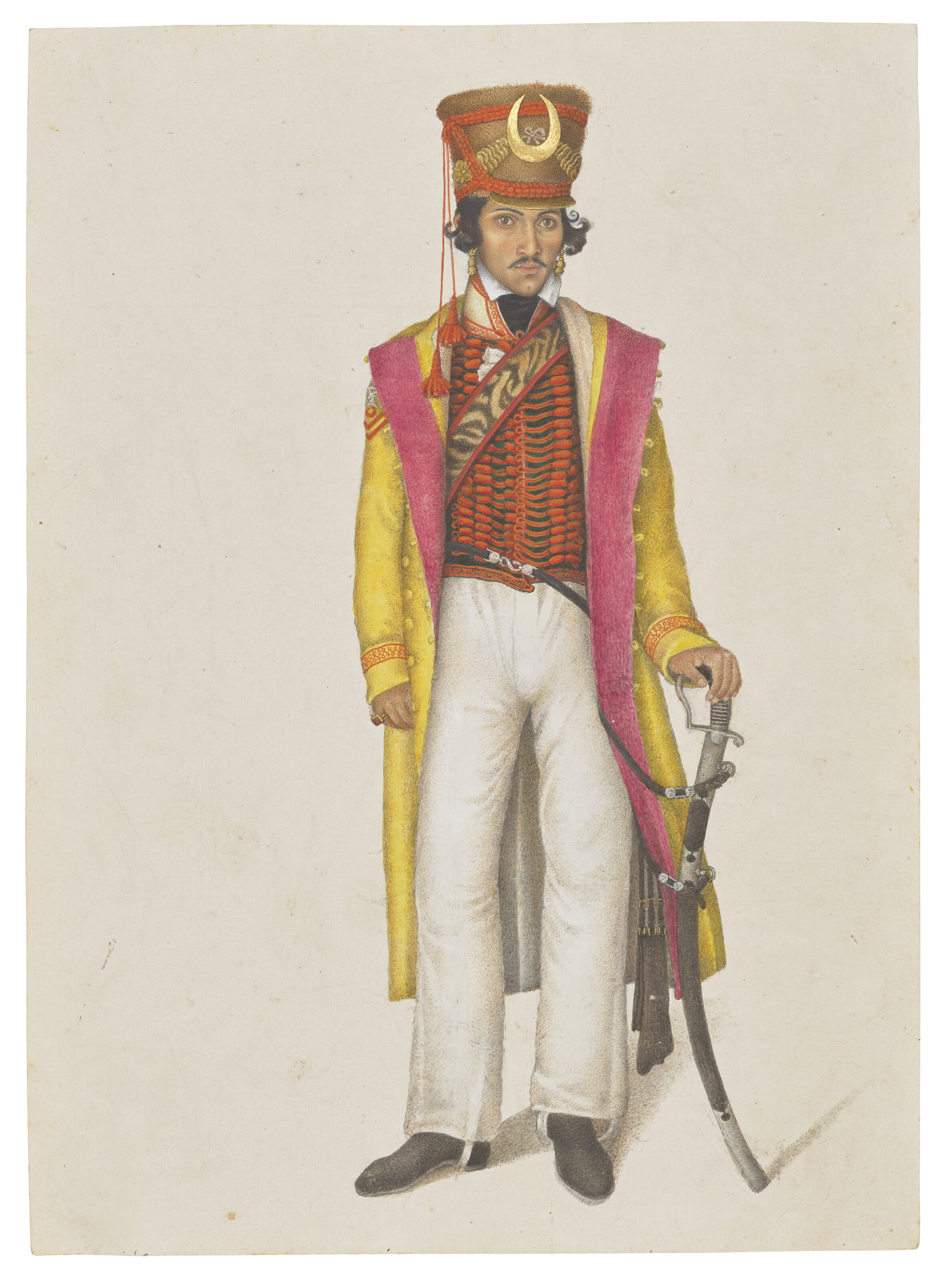
A Master of the Fraser Album, Ummee Chund in the Uniform of Skinner's Horse, c. May 1819

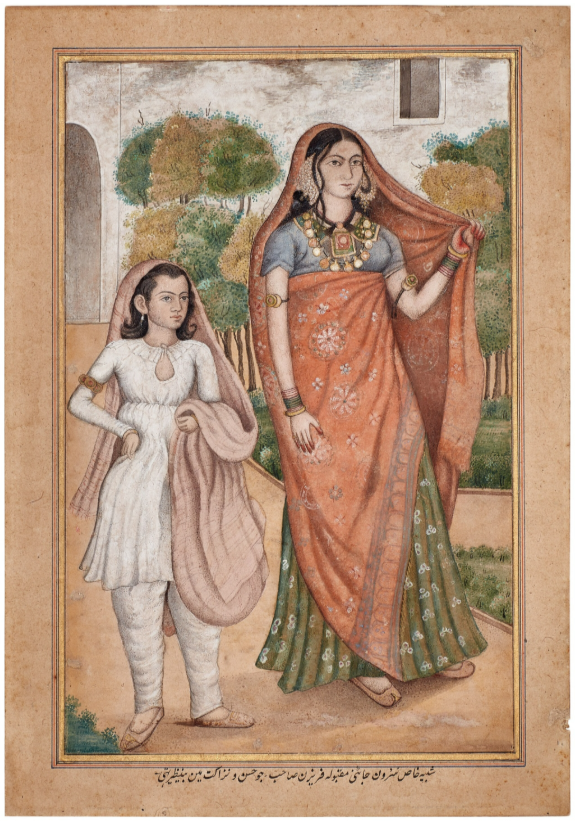
A Master of the Fraser Album, William Fraser’s Bibi, 1816.

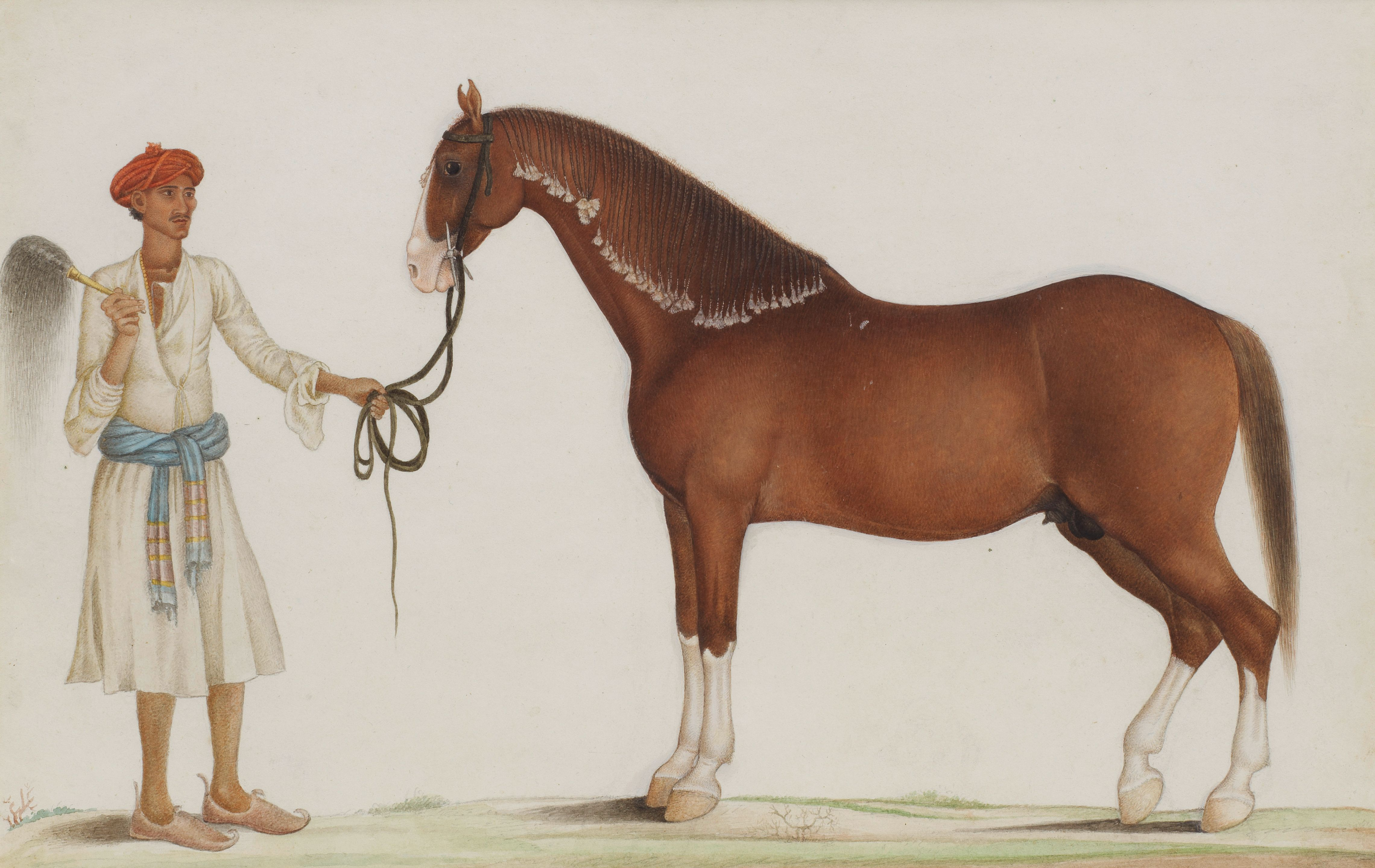
A Master of the Fraser Album, A Kathiawar Horse, Puch Kuleean, 1816.

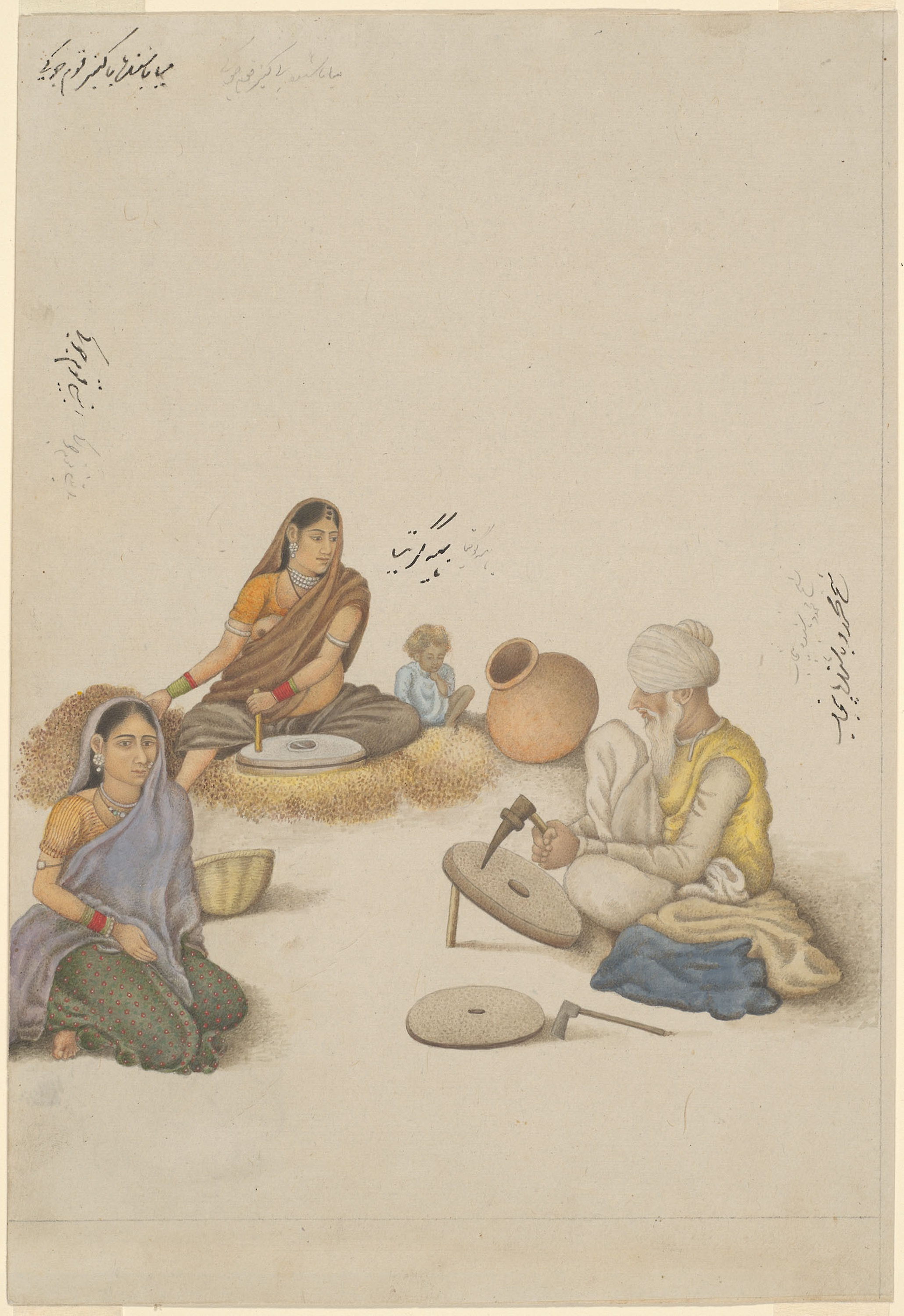
A Master of the Fraser Album, Villagers Grinding Corn, c. 1816-20. Art Institute of Chicago

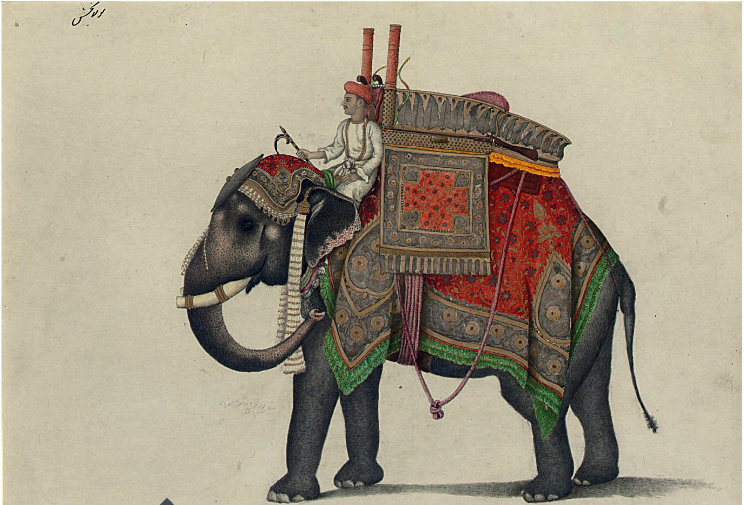
A Master of the Fraser Album, Elephant and Driver, c. 1815–1819.

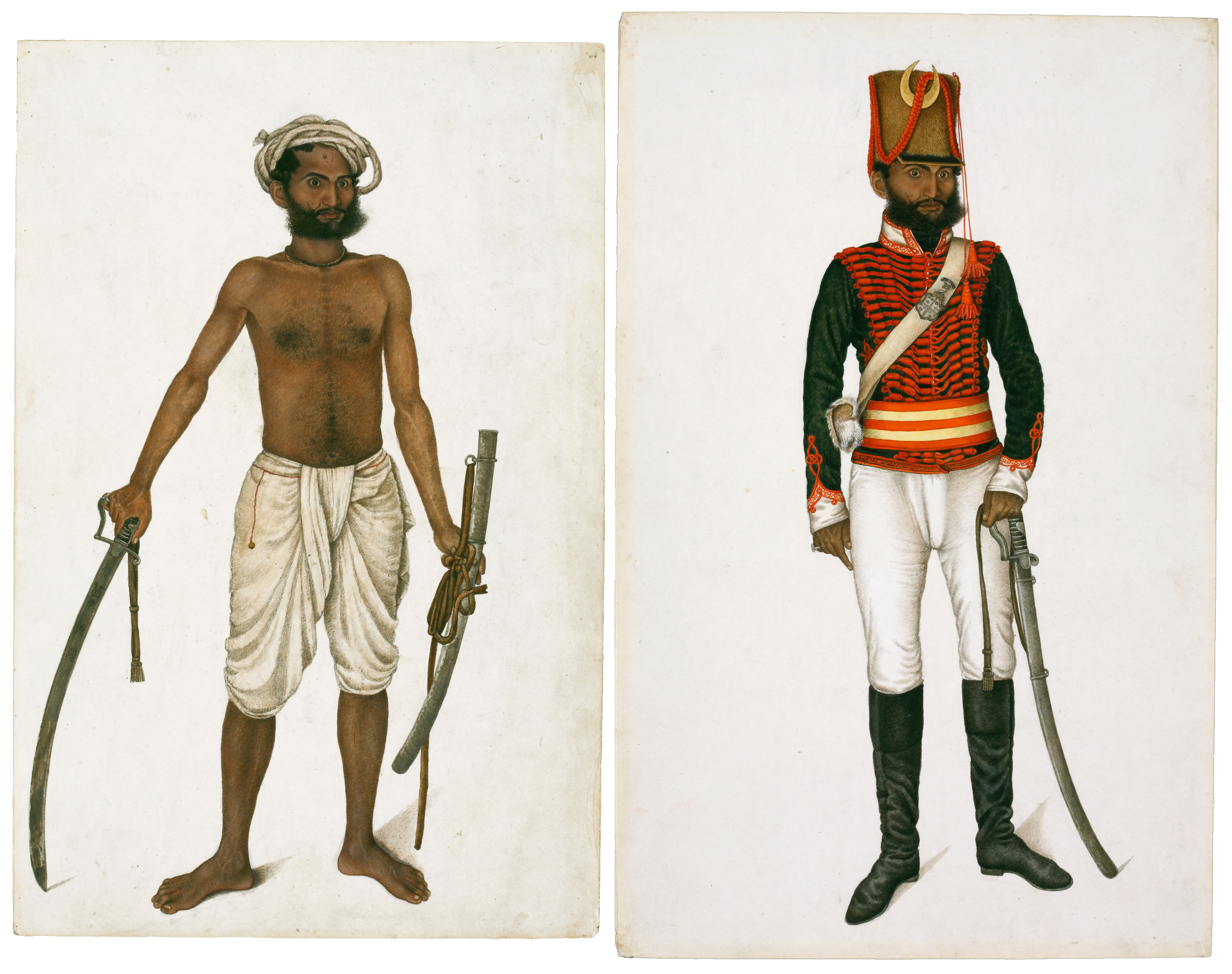
A Master of the Fraser Album, Kala, the Sepoy, with Sabre Drawn and in Uniform, c. 1815–1816. The David Collection

== See also ==
- Delhi Book
