= James Baillie Fraser =

Scottish travel writer and artist (1783–1856)

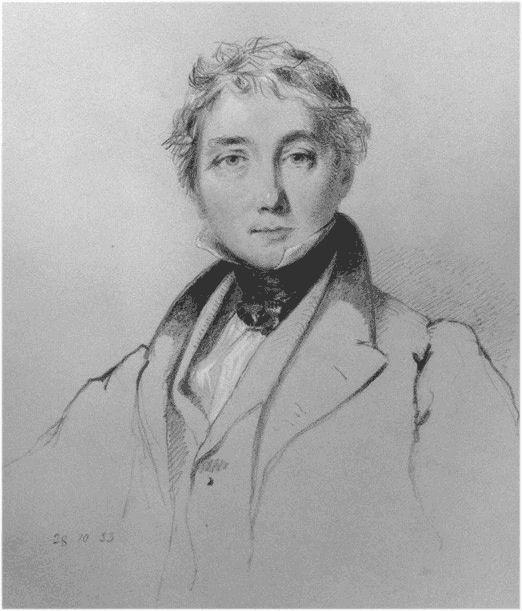
Portrait by William Brockedon (1833)

James Baillie Fraser (11 June 1783 – 23 January 1856) was a Scottish travel writer, and artist who illustrated and wrote about Asia Minor, Iran, India and Kurdistan. Some of his watercolours made in the picturesque style represent early views of India and Iran. He was a brother of William Fraser.

During his travel to Mashhad, he converted to Islam at the Imam Reza Shrine in 1822.

== Early life ==
James was born at Reelig in the county of Inverness. He was the eldest of five sons of Edward Satchwell Fraser (1751–1835) and his wife Jane. He grew up on the family estate and studied under a tutor in Edinburgh.

He lived from 1799 to 1811 in Guiana to oversee the sugar plantations that they owned in Berbice. When he left Berbice, Fraser wrote that the enslaved people he managed for his family's estate looked on him for "redress or happiness", reflecting the power he had over their lives. He returned from the West Indies in 1806 due to ill health. All of his brothers travelled in the East and had successful careers.

== India ==
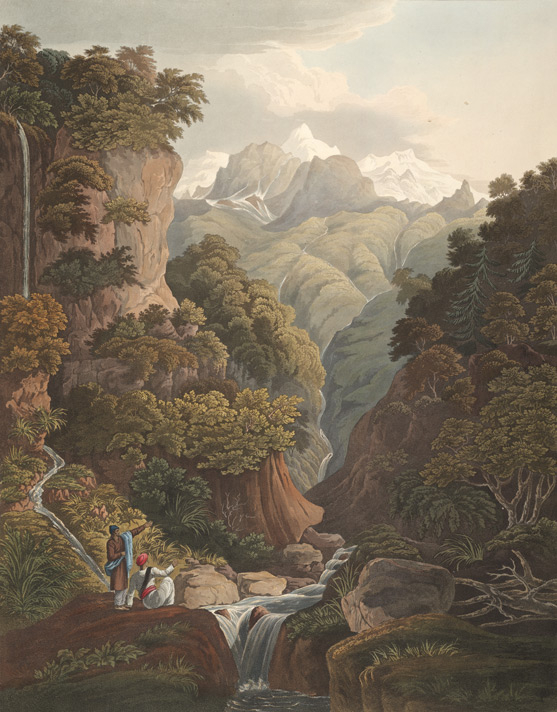
Jumnotree, the source of the River Jumna (1820)

James' father had mortgaged the family estate to buy the sugar plantation in the West Indies. When sugar prices collapsed due to overproduction, they mortgaged the plantation and soon ran into debts.

In early 1813 James set sail for India, hoping to set up a trade business in Calcutta to help pay off the family debts. His ship ran into a sandbank off Madras and he was finally able to reach Calcutta only in October. The trade venture did not do well and failed the next year.

In January 1815 he went to join his brother William (assassinated in 1835 possibly at the behest of Shams-ud-Din, Nawab of Firozpur who believed that William prevented him from inheriting title and wealth) who was posted in Delhi. His brother was a Writer to the East India Company. His work in Delhi dealt with land survey and settlement and involved being out in the field and meeting people.

William had demonstrated his excellence in Indian languages and customs and he maintained local artists to draw portraits in what is now called the "Company school" style. William was also a keen outdoorsman who went tiger hunting on foot. William had Indian mistresses or bibis although little is known about his children. He was also a close friend of James Skinner, a Scottish soldier born to a Rajput mother. Skinner raised the cavalry regiment known after him as Skinner's Horse and James was later to write a memoir on his life.

Around the time that James visited, William had been appointed to work as a political agent in the Nepal war. Fascinated by the hilly country where they finally met, James began to sketch the scenery of the Himalayan region. He later travelled the region, seeking the source of the rivers Yamuna and Ganga. James found that he was not good with human figures and decided to learn from portraits made of Gurkhas by the native artists (especially one named Lalljee) employed by his brother. In 1820 several of these aquatints were printed as Views in the Himala Mountains.

In 1816 James returned to Calcutta and joined a partner in shipping business. He also took more interest in art and worked with professional artists William Havell (1782–1857) and George Chinnery (1744–1852). In 1826 he published Views of Calcutta and its Environs. He travelled west to Bombay, and then accompanied the East India Company officer Andrew Jukes to Persia, sailing to Bushehr and then on to Tehran, and finally reached London in 1823.

Jukes died on the way at Esfahan in 1821. During this journey Fraser sketched and kept a diary, published as Narrative of a Journey into Khorasan in the Years 1821 and 1822 (1825) and Travels and Adventures in the Persian Provinces of the Southern Banks of the Caspian Sea (1826).

In 1823 he married Jane, daughter of Alexander Fraser Tytler, Lord Woodhouselee, a sister of the historian Patrick Fraser Tytler.

== Iran ==
=== Conversion to Islam ===
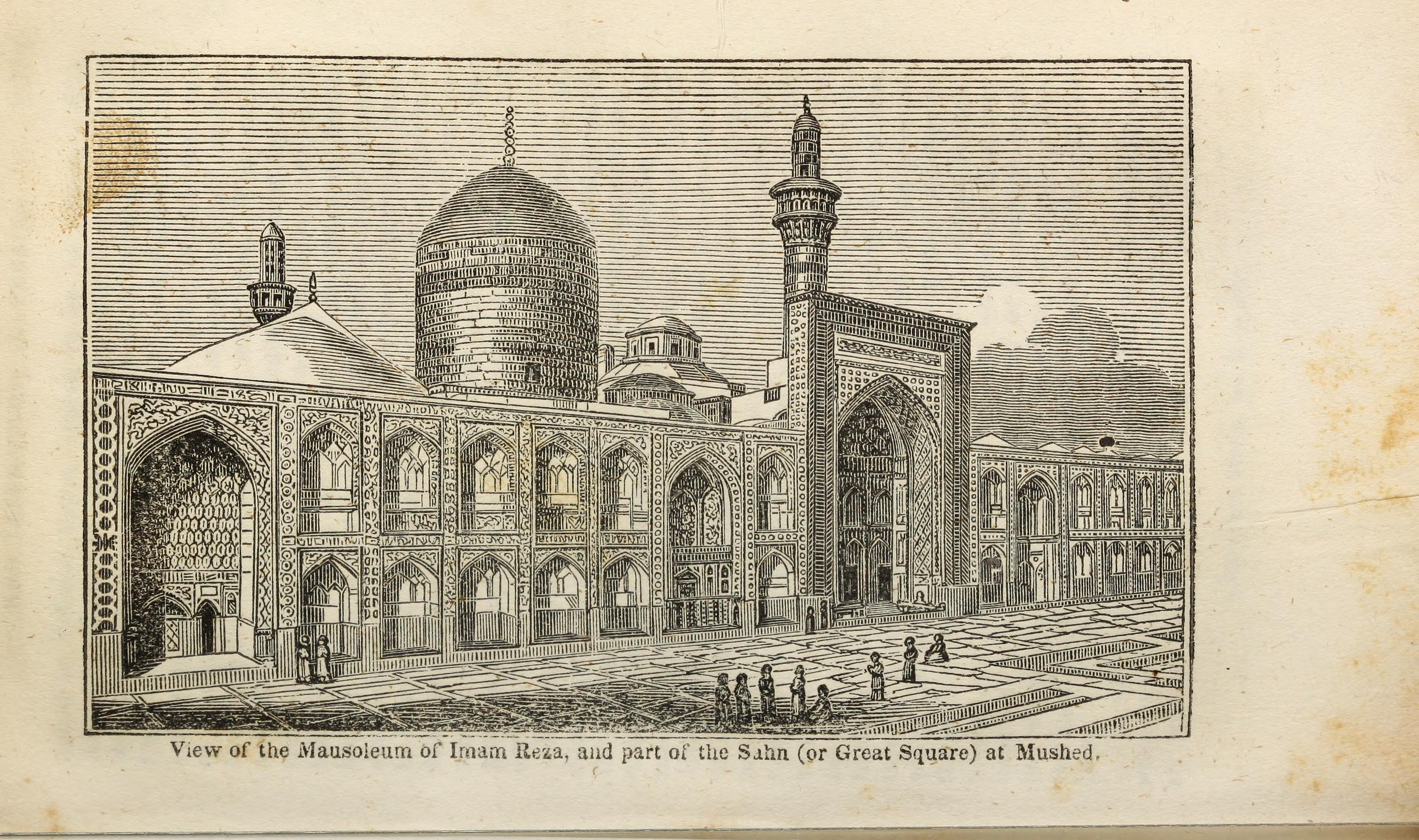
A painting of Imam Reza shrine by James Baillie Fraser, 1822. He journeyed to Mashhad and converted to Islam at the shrine.

In 1821, he decided to return to his homeland via Bushehr and Tehran. In Qom, disguised in different clothing, he visited the Fatima Masumeh Shrine. In Mashhad, with the help of a clerical friend, he converted to Islam and was able to enter the Imam Reza shrine and sketch freely without being disturbed. He entered and sketch Persian mosques which no European had entered before. After six weeks in Mashhad, Fraser headed west, traveling through Gorgan, and then along the southern coast of the Caspian Sea to Ardabil, Tabriz, and Urmia.

Russian moves in Turkey caused fears in Britain and Lord Glenelg appointed James to investigate in Iran. Fraser was appointed escort officer to the three Qajar princes, Rezaqholi Mirza, Teymur Mirza, and Najafqholi Mirza, who had come to London to seek help and protection from the British government. He also accompanied them on their return until Constantinople. During this period, he travelled extensively on horseback but his health was impaired by the exposure. He wrote several historic novels and romances. After nearly eight months in Iran, he returned to his home in Scotland in 1823. He died without children at his estate in Reelick on 23 January 1856.

== Art and writing ==
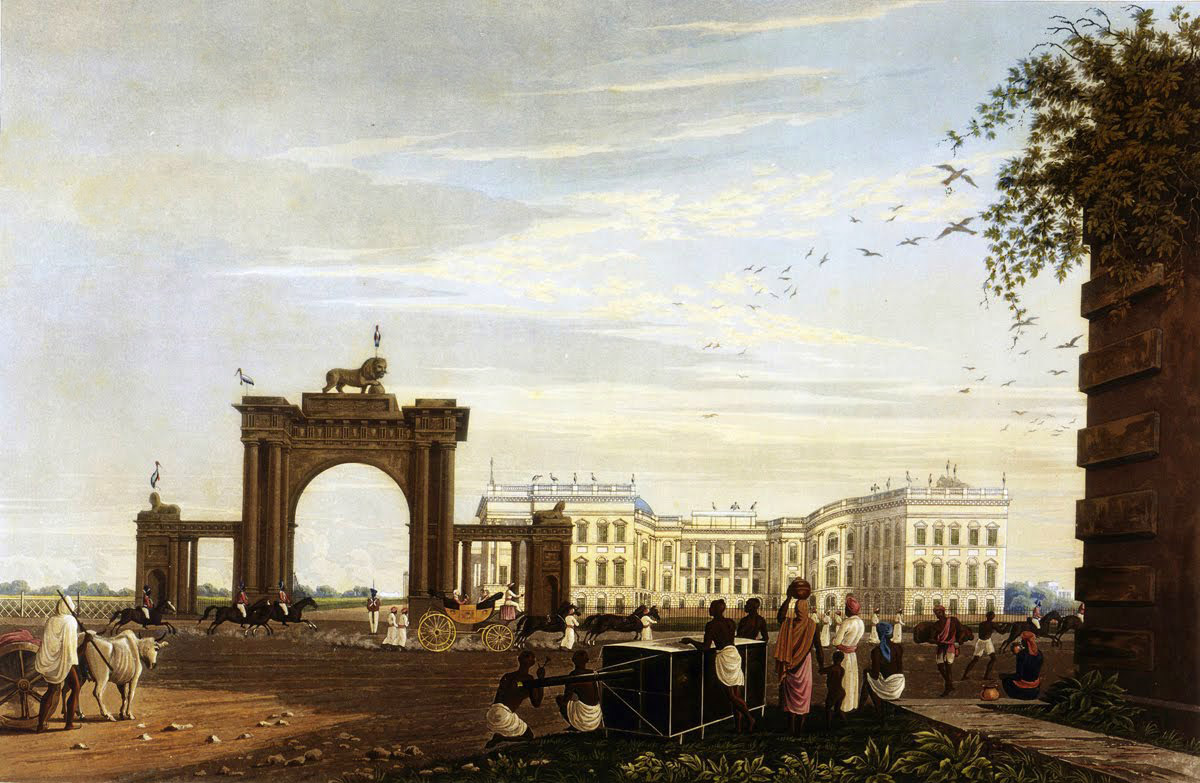
A view of Calcutta in 1819 by R Havell, Jr. based on James Baillie Fraser.

Fraser displayed great skill with watercolours, and several of his drawings were lithographically reproduced. Most of his landscapes are considered "picturesque". The astronomical observations which he took during some of his journeys did considerable service to the cartography of Asia. The works by which he attained his literary reputation were accounts of his travels and fictitious tales illustrative of Eastern life. In both he employed a vigorous and impassioned style which was on the whole wonderfully effective in spite of minor faults in taste and flaws in structure.

Fraser's earliest writings are: Journal of a Tour through Part of the Himala Mountains and to the Sources of the Jumna and the Ganges (1820); A Narrative of a Journey into Khorasan in the Years 1821 and 1822, including some Account of the Countries to the North-East of Persia (1825); and Travels and Adventures in the Persian Provinces on the Southern Banks of the Caspian Sea (1826). His romances include The Kuzzilbash, a Tale of Khorasan (1828), and its sequel The Persian Adventurer (1830); Allee Neemroo (1842); and The Dark Falcon (1844). He also wrote An Historical and Descriptive Account of Persia (1834); A Winter's Journey (Tâtar,) from Constantinople to Teheran (1838); Travels in Koordistan, Mesopotamia, etc. (1840) Mesopotamia and Assyria (1842); and Military Memoirs of Col. James Skinner (1851).
