= William Fraser (British India civil servant) =

British India civil servant, 1784–1835

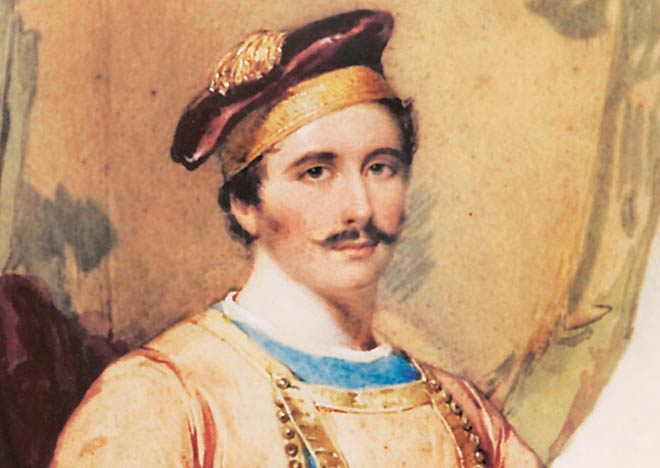
William Fraser, 1806 painting

William Fraser (1784 – 22 March 1835) was a British India civil servant who was an Agent to the Governor General of India and Commissioner of the Delhi Territory during the reign of the last Mughal Emperor, Bahadur Shah Zafar.

== Biography ==
William was born in Northern Scotland in 1784, the younger brother of amateur artist James Baillie Fraser.

He would travel to India in 1802, quickly taking up service with the East India Company, appointed as secretary to Sir David Ochterlony in 1805. He would later be appointed secretary to Mountstuart Elphinstone on his mission to Kabul. In 1815, he was granted permission by the English resident in Delhi, Sir Thomas Metcalfe, to join Colonel James Skinner's regiment, Skinners Horse later becoming Skinner's friend and Adjutant, and eventually commanding the 3rd Corps. That same year he accepted the post of Political Agent to Major General Martindale, joining Skinner and his brother James on an expedition to Nepal, to settle areas affected by the Anglo-Nepalese War. He would return to Delhi in 1830, and settle in a Bungalow near the Kashmiri Gate, behind St. James Church.

He was shot and killed near his home on the 22nd of March 1835 by Kareem Khan, an assassin hired by Shamsuddin Ahmed Khan, Nawab of Loharu and Ferozepur Jhirka. Both individuals were hanged for their parts in the murder of Fraser. The assassination was due to aggrivation over Fraser's espousal of his brother's claims in a property dispute. His death is mentioned in the Delhi Book (1844) of Sir Thomas Metcalfe. He was first buried at a local burial ground, and later reburied at the St. James' Church, Delhi in 1836 in a marble tomb commissioned by Colonel James Skinner.

Today William Fraser's bungalow houses the Office of Chief Engineer Northern Railways (Construction) and has restricted entry. William Dalrymple mentions visiting the bungalow in his 1994 book City of Djinns.

== Personal life ==
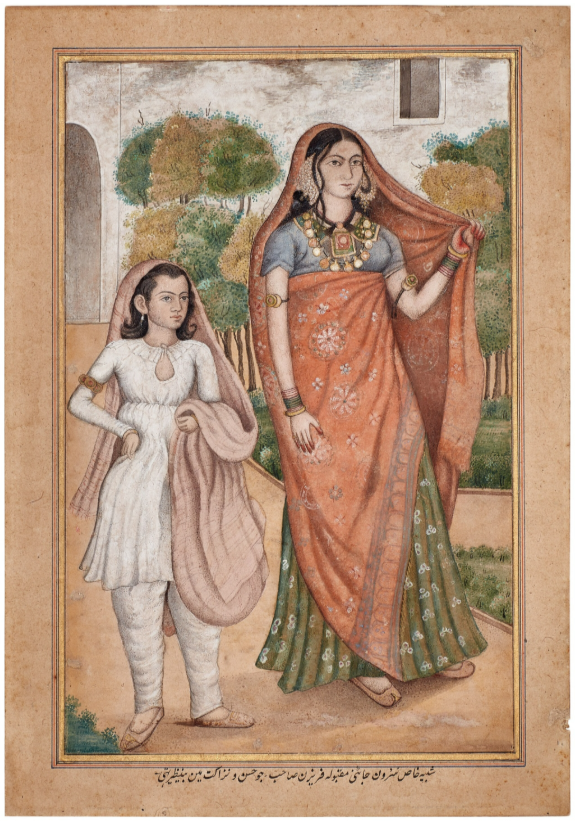
A Master of the Fraser Album, William Fraser’s Bibi, 1816.

In 1819, William Fraser settled in Garhwal for a period, and visited Rania, Haryana, where he married a Jat Woman called Sarwan (alternatively Sarvan), with whom he had two sons, and a daughter.

Fraser is perhaps best known as a patron of Delhi Company School artists, and his role in creating the Fraser Album, alongside his brother James. The creation of the Album stemmed largely from his interest in the people and culture of colonial India, admiring particularly the Mughal poet Ghalib.

== Gallery ==
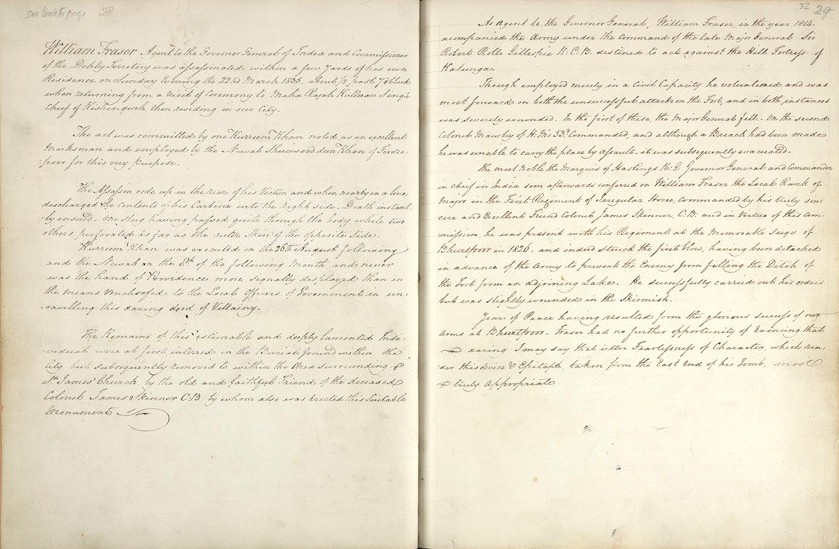
Description of assassination of William Frazer in Delhi Book (1844) of Sir Thomas Metcalfe

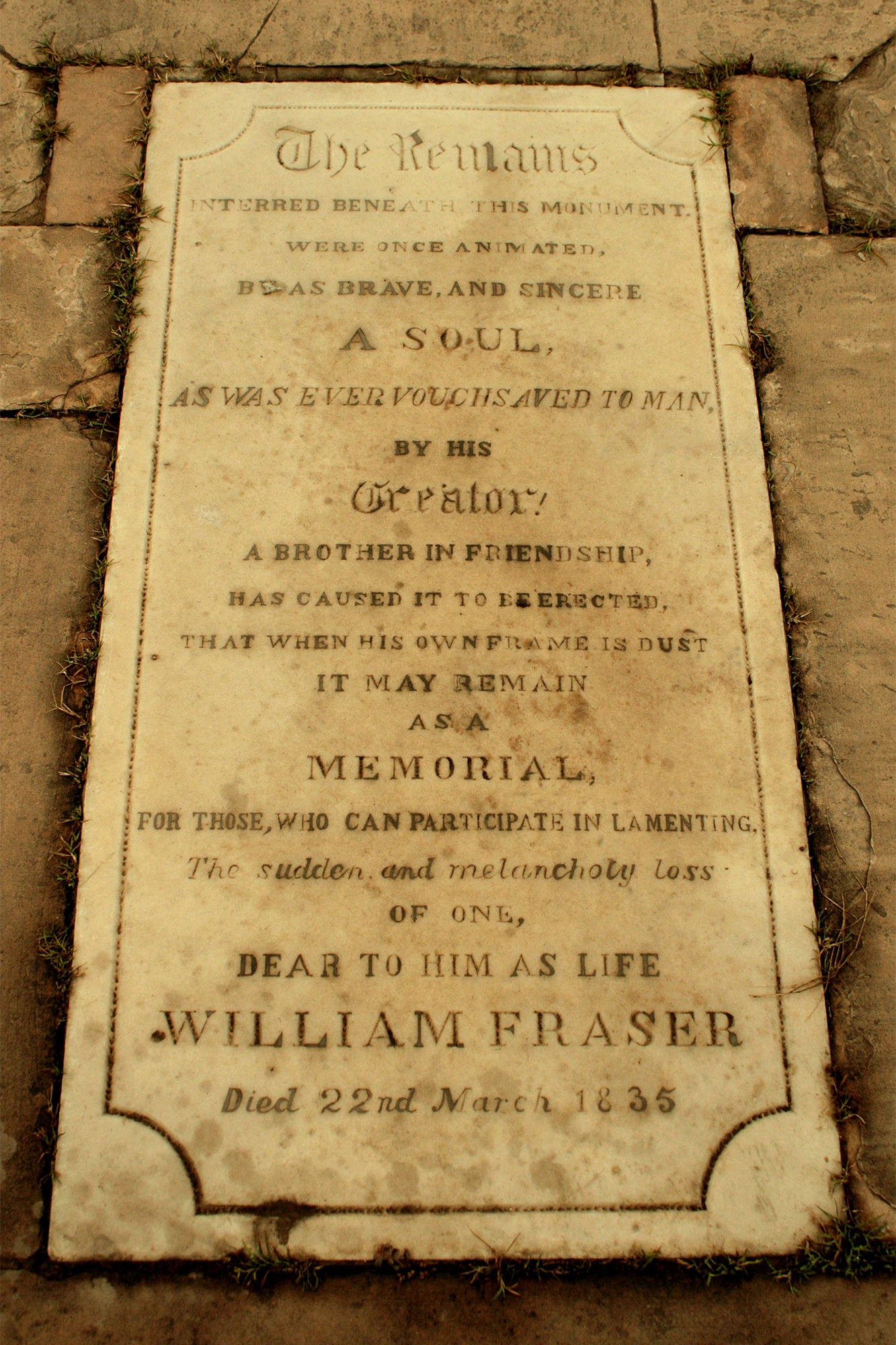
Tomb of William Fraser at St. James' Church, Delhi, near Kashmiri Gate.

== See also ==
- List of British Residents or Political Agents in Delhi, 1803–57
