= Delhi Book =

19th collection of Indian paintings

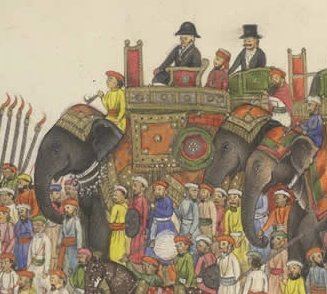
Thomas Metcalfe

Delhi Book or Delhie Book titled Reminiscences of Imperial Delhi is a collection of paintings done in Company style, commissioned by Sir Thomas Metcalfe in 1844. It contains 120 paintings by Indian artists, mainly by Mughal painter, Mazhar Ali Khan. The book was bought by the British Library in London.

== History ==
It was commissioned by Sir Thomas Metcalfe, Governor-General's Agent at the Imperial court of the Mughal Emperor, Bahadur Shah Zafar. The paintings, done by Mughal painter, Mazhar Ali Khan, document the lifestyle of the last Mughal in 19th century Delhi.

The book containing the paintings was sent to England for Metcalfe's daughter, Emily.

== The book ==
The Delhi Book is an album consisting of 89 folios with approximately 130 paintings by Indian artists. The paintings depict Mughal and pre-Mughal monuments of Delhi, the lives of native Indians, and other contemporary material. Metcalfe added extensive descriptions to almost all paintings and bound them into a book. He had assembled the album as a gift for his daughter Emily, who at the time in 1844 lived in England. The book shows buildings as they were before the siege of Delhi during the Indian Mutiny. Many of these structures were razed, vandalized, or suffered neglect in the years following the Mutiny.

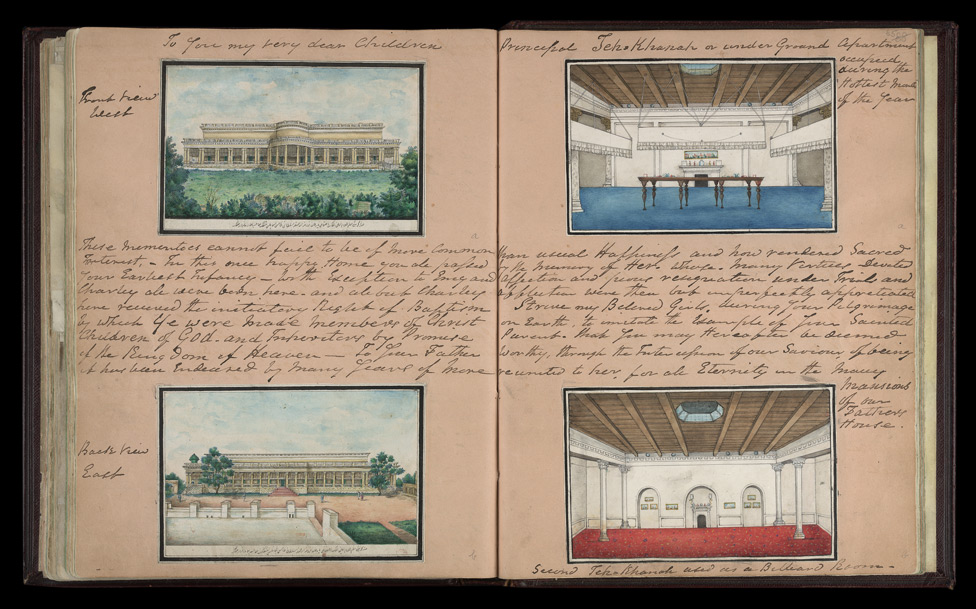
Different views of the Metcalfe House, Delhi, 1843, which now houses the Laser Science and Technology Centre (DRDO).

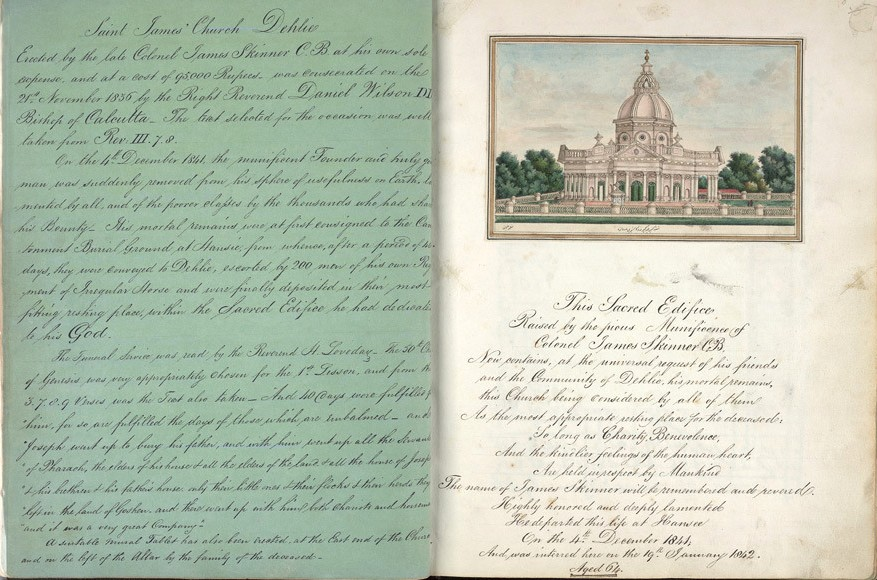
St. James' Church, Delhi

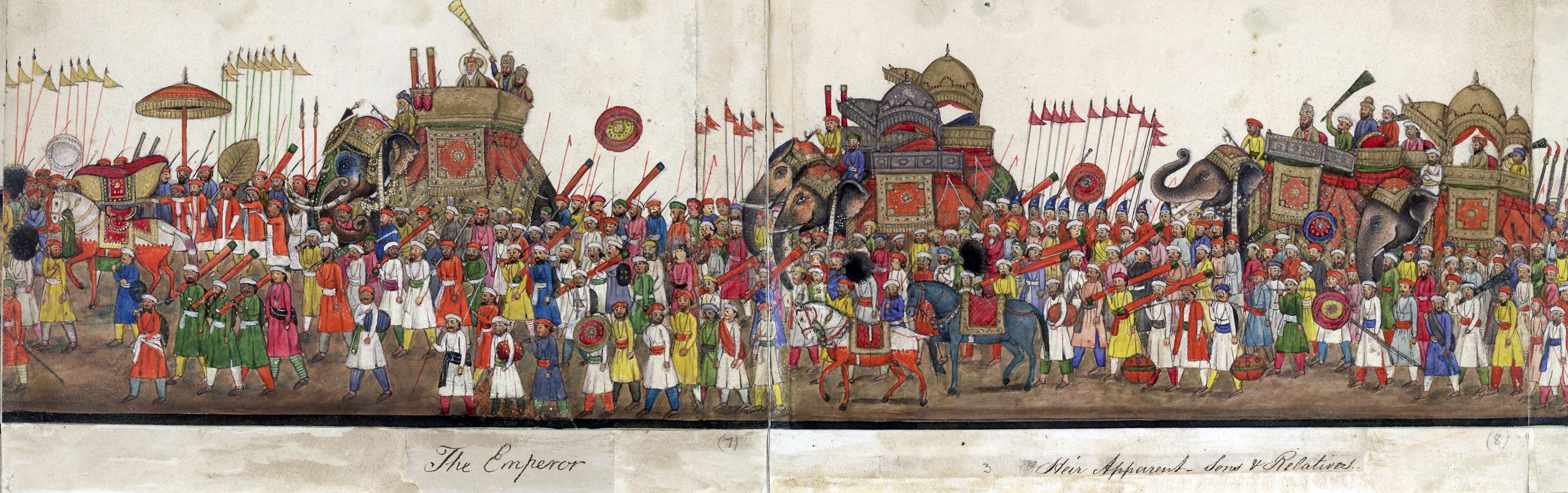
A panorama in 12 folds showing the procession of the Emperor Bahadur Shah Zafar II to celebrate the feast of the 'Id., 1843.

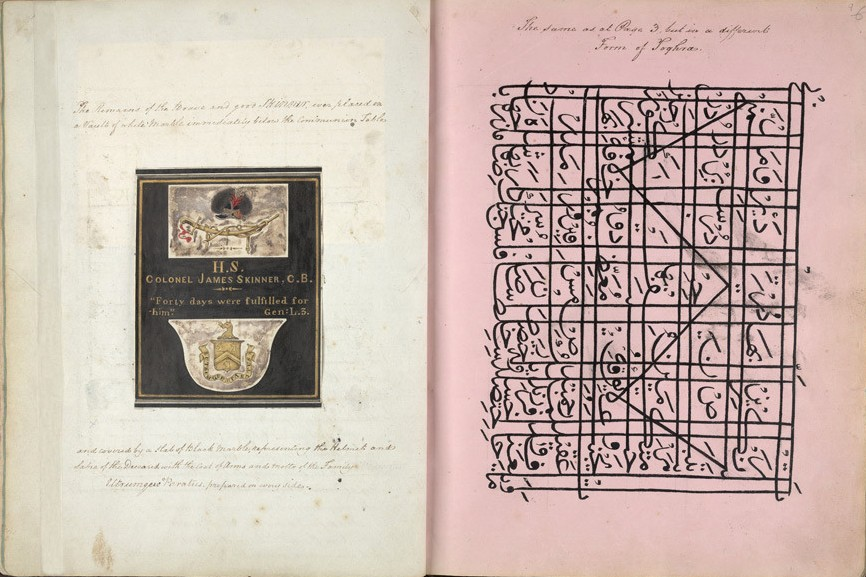
Details of the tomb of Colonel James Skinner C.B. at St. James' Church, Delhi, and Styles and titles in Persian of Metcalfe as Agent of Governor-General of India(right page)

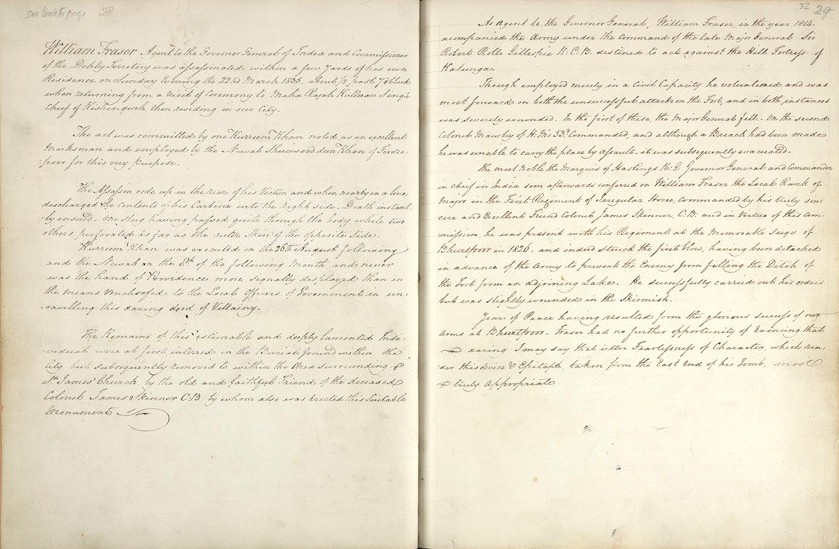
Description of assassination of William Frazer, Agent to the Governor-General of India, on 22 March 1835, in Delhi.

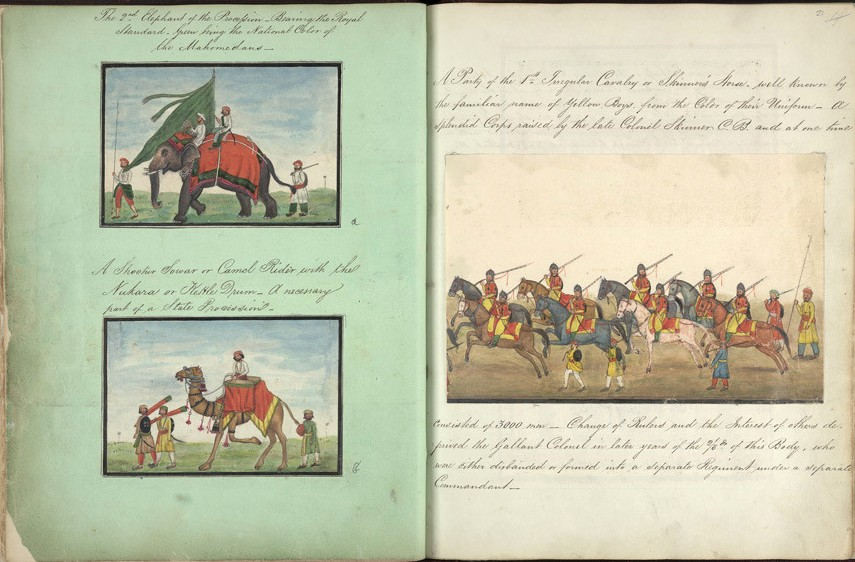
Scenes from a Royal procession, and a party of Skinner's Horse regiment.
