= Christianity in Delhi =

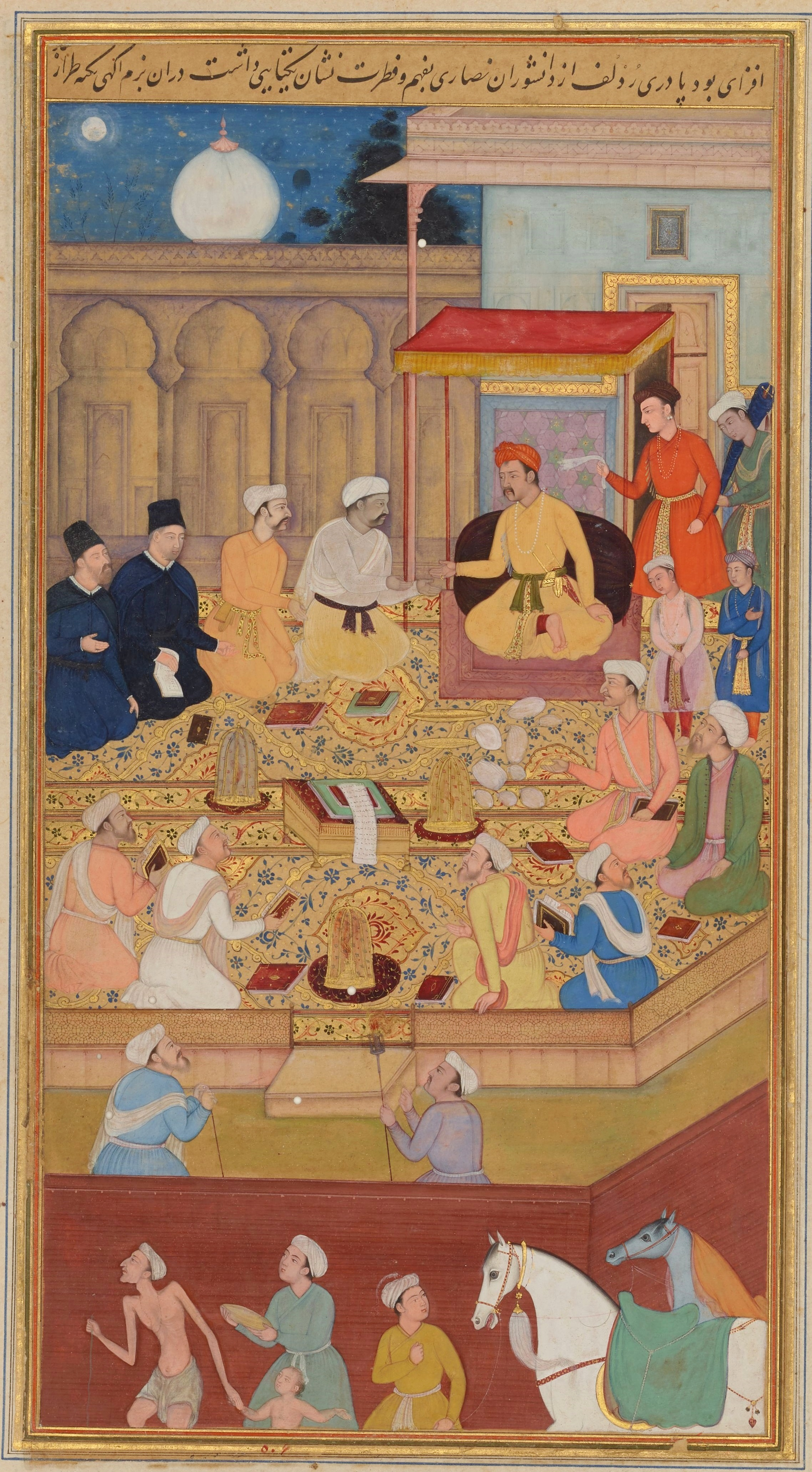
Mughal Emperor Akbar the Great (r. 1556-1605) holds a religious assembly in the Ibadat Khana (House of Worship) in Fatehpur Sikri; the two men dressed in black are the Jesuit missionaries Rodolfo Acquaviva and Francisco Henriques. Illustration to the Akbarnama, miniature painting by Nar Singh, ca. 1605.

Christianity is a minority religion in Delhi, the National Capital Territory of India. A diocese of the Church of North India is established in Delhi, as well as the Roman Catholic Archdiocese of Delhi. Other major churches include the Central Baptist Church, St. Mary's Orthodox Cathedral Hauz Khas (belonging to the Indian (Malankara) Orthodox Church), and the head office of the Northern Region of the Indian Pentecostal Church of God (situated in Bhai Vir Singh Marg, New Delhi). A Christian Revival Church is also located in New Delhi. The Syro-Malabar Diocese of Faridabad also has presence in Delhi.

Christians in Delhi
Year	Number	Percentage
2001	130,319	0.94
2011	146,093	0.87

== History ==
=== Mughal ===
Christianity in Delhi dates back to the Mughal emperor Akbar's era. Emperor Akbar was known for his secular theology. A Jesuit priest was invited by Akbar from Goa in 1579 in order that Akbar might receive knowledge about Christianity.

Sir Thomas Roe, King James I's ambassador to India during Jahangir's reign, tells the story that two princes converted to Christianity (including Janghir's nephew) only to enable Jahangir to demand to Portuguese women for himself. This ploy was unsuccessful. During the reign of Emperor Aurangzeb there was a decline in Christianity. In 1723 Father Desideri founded the city church dedicated to the Virgin Mary. The church was destroyed by Nadir Shah, who invaded Delhi in 1739. Jesuit priests managed to save their lives by hiding in a tumbledown house.

=== British ===
Christianity was introduced to Delhi for the second time by the British. British soldiers made numerous churches for their own worship. The Church of England sent many missionaries to India to propagate the Gospel among people who were unaware of Christianity. Numerous people were converted to Christianity by their efforts. Many among the converts worked for the British government. During the Indian Rebellion of 1857 several sepoys who had stayed loyal to the Company were removed by the mutineers and killed, either because of their loyalty or because they had become Christian. After these events, Christianity declined in Delhi once more.

== List of Churches in Delhi ==
- St. Basil Orthodox Church, Rohini
- India Pentecostal Church of God Northern region Headquarters.
- Cathedral Church of the Redemption
- St. Mary's Church, Delhi 6
- Sacred Heart Cathedral, New Delhi
- Green Park Free Church, New Delhi
- Centenary Methodist Church, Lodhi Road
- Central Baptist Church (Delhi)
- Cathedral Church of the Redemption
- Crossway Church
- St. James' Church, Delhi
- St. Stephen's Church, Delhi
- St. Sebastian's Church, Dilshad Garden
- St. Peter and Paul church, Najafgarh - New Delhi 110043
- Christian Revival Church New Delhi

== See also ==
- List of Christian denominations in North East India
- Christianity in Arunachal Pradesh
- Christianity in India
- Christian Revival Church
