= Medd =

Medd is a surname. Notable people with the surname include:

- Bruce Medd (born 1953), Canadian gymnast and Olympics competitor
- Donald Gordon Medd Nelson (1914–1989), Canadian surgeon general and air force medical officer
- Gordon Medd (1925–1996), English footballer
- Henry Medd (1892–1977), British architect
- Mary Medd (1907–2005), British architect
- Pete Medd (born 1976), American football player and coach
- Peter Medd (1829–1908), English priest and scholar
- William George Medd (1869–1951), Canadian businessman and politician
