= Golden Mosque =

Golden Mosque or Sunehri Masjid (Hindi-Urdu) may refer to:

- Golden Mosque (Red Fort), Old Delhi, India
- Sunehri Masjid (Chandni Chowk), Delhi, India
- Sunehri Bagh Masjid, Delhi, India
- Sunehri Mosque, Lahore, Punjab, Pakistan
- Sunehri Mosque, Peshawar, Khyber Pakhtunkhwa, Pakistan
- Al-Askari Shrine, Iraq
- Masjid Al-Dahab, Philippines
- Dian Al-Mahri Mosque, Indonesia
