= Lutyens media =

Pejorative term for New Delhi's English-language media elite

Lutyens' media
- Type: Political pejorative
- Language: English
- Named after: Lutyens' Delhi
- Usage: Indian political discourse, from about 2014
- Related terms: "Khan Market gang"; "godi media" (opposite sense)

Lutyens' media, also called the Lutyens' Delhi media or the Lutyens' lobby, is a pejorative term in Indian political discourse for the established English-language news media and journalists based in New Delhi. Those who use it portray this group as a liberal, elite class with close ties to the political establishment, and in particular to the Indian National Congress. The term is used mainly by the Bharatiya Janata Party and its supporters and by Hindutva commentators, and it became widespread after the party came to national power in 2014.

The name derives from Lutyens' Delhi, the central district of New Delhi laid out under the British architect Edwin Lutyens, which houses much of the country's political, bureaucratic, and media elite. Those who use the term allege that a network of Delhi-based journalists enjoyed proximity to power and shaped the national news agenda in favour of earlier Congress-led governments. A related phrase, the "Khan Market gang", was used by Prime Minister Narendra Modi in a 2019 interview to The Indian Express to describe the same milieu.
