= Lutyens' Delhi =

Area in New Delhi, Delhi, India

- Neighborhood
- Location in Delhi, India
- Coordinates: 28°38′8.74″N 77°13′28.02″E
- Country: India
- Union Territory: Delhi
- District: New Delhi
- Named for: Sir Edwin Lutyens

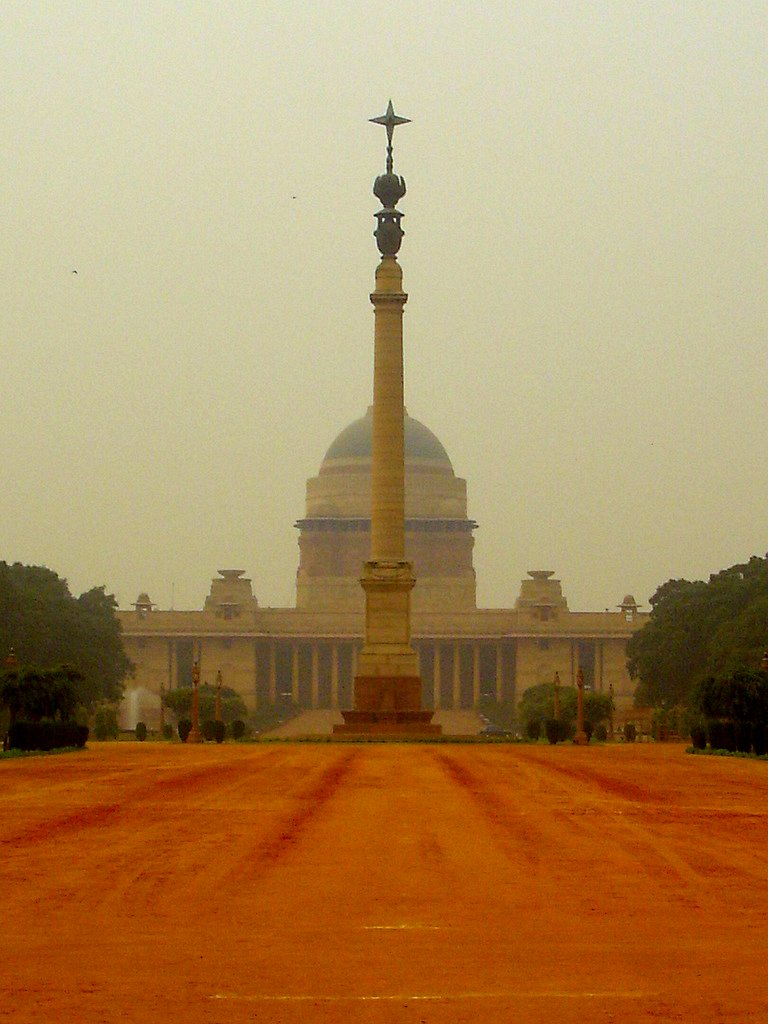
View of Rashtrapati Bhavan with the Jaipur Column in the foreground, in Lutyens' Delhi.

Lutyens' Delhi is a vast precinct in New Delhi, India, named after the British architect Edwin Lutyens (1869–1944), who was responsible for much of its architectural design and construction. The establishment and development of this imposing precinct occurred during the reign of the British Raj, when India was a colonial possession of the British Empire. Work lasted between the late-1910s and 1930s. This also includes the Lutyens Bungalow Zone (LBZ). The genesis of Lutyens' Delhi paved way for the foundation of New Delhi, which now serves as the capital of India, as is now synonymous with Lutyens' work.

Lutyens designed four bungalows in the Viceroy House Estate, which was rechristened to the Rashtrapati Bhavan Estate following independence; now, these bungalows lie on the Mother Teresa Crescent (then Willingdon Crescent). Lutyens, apart from designing the Viceroy's House, designed large government building and was involved with town planning.

Herbert Baker, who also designed with the Secretariat Buildings (North and South Block), designed bungalows on the then King George's Avenue (south of the Secretariats) for high-ranking officials. Other members of the team of architects were Robert Tor Russell, who built Connaught Place, the Eastern and Western Courts on Janpath, Flagstaff House (now referred to as the Teen Murti House), Willingdon Airfield (now referred to as Safdarjung Airport), Irwin Amphitheatre (renamed Major Dhyan Chand National Stadium) and several government houses, William Henry Nicholls, CG Blomfield, FB Blomfield, Walter Sykes George, Arthur Gordon Shoosmith and Henry Medd.

It is on the 2002 World Monuments Watch list of 100 most endangered sites, composed by the World Monuments Fund, a heritage organization based in New York.

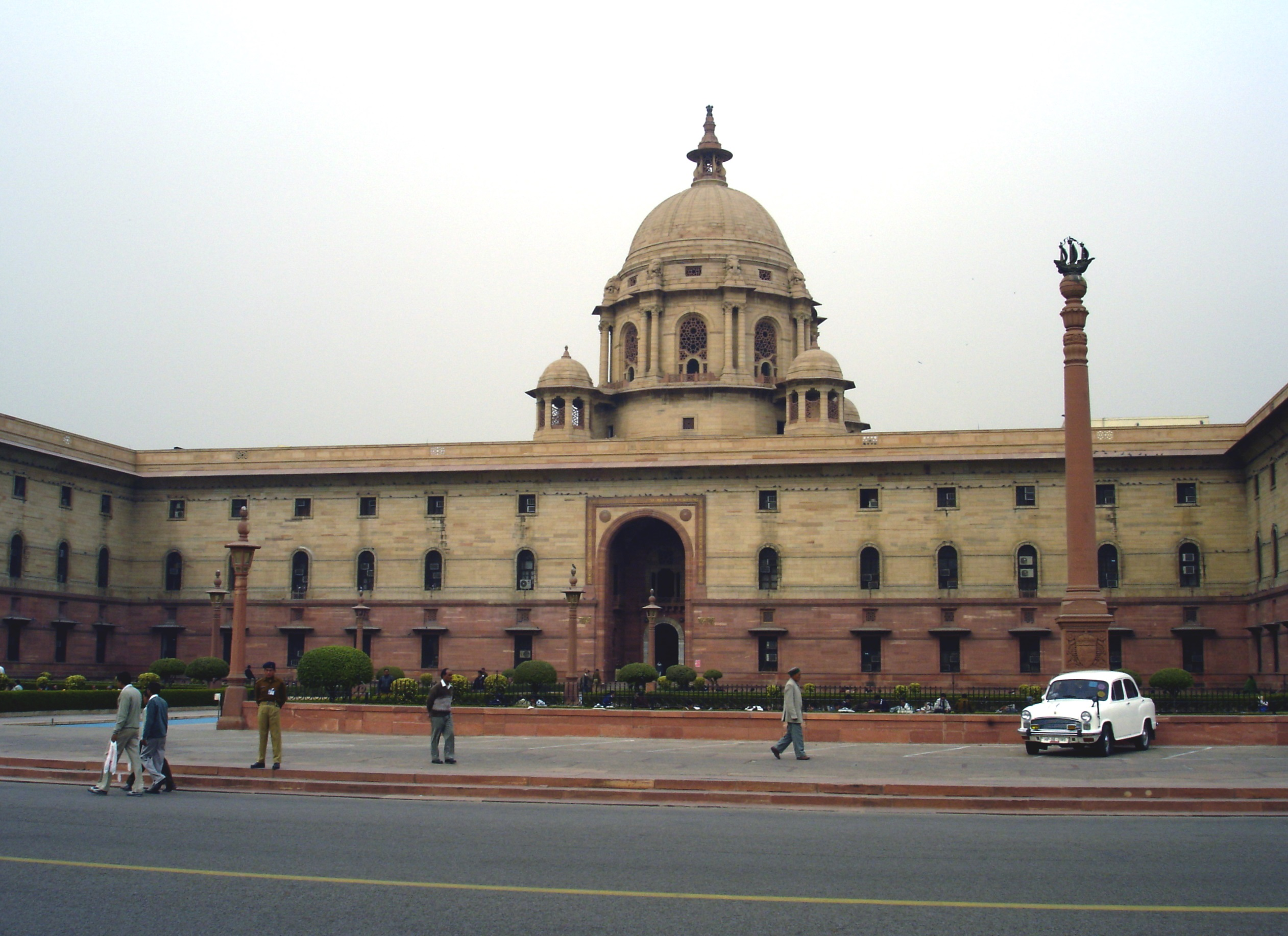
The South Block

== History ==
The area was constructed following the imperial British administration's decision to move the capital of their Indian Empire from Calcutta to Delhi; thus, a new precinct was carved out of the latter, christened New Delhi.

Before the new imperial capital was established in 1911, the Old Delhi Railway Station served the Agra-Delhi railways, cutting through what is today called Lutyens' Delhi. The line was eventually shifted to make way for the new capital and the New Delhi Railway Station was built near Ajmeri Gate in 1926.

== Design and construction ==
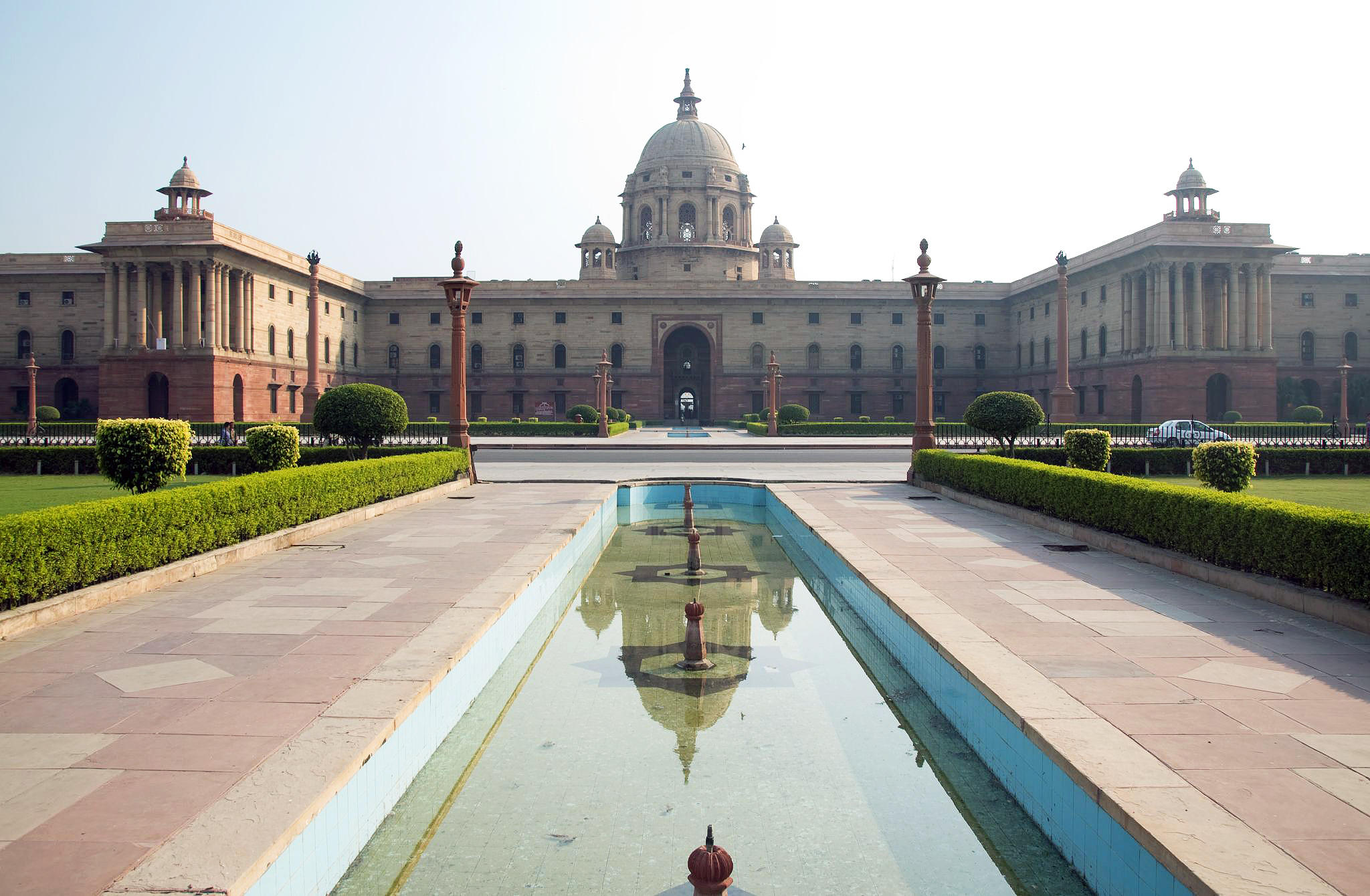
The North Block, as viewed from South Block; the South Block is identical to the North Block

Lutyens led a group of architects in laying out the central administrative area of the city, mandated with retaining one-third of the area as green space. At the heart of the city was the formidable and imposing Viceroy's House (later rechristened to Rashtrapati Bhawan, which now serves as the residence of the President of India), located atop Raisina Hill. Kingsway (now Rajpath), a sprawling boulevard, connects the All India War Memorial (now known as India Gate) to the Viceroy's House, while Queensway (now referred to as Janpath), which intersects it orthogonally, connects the South End Road (renamed Rajesh Pilot Marg) with Connaught Place.

The Secretariat Building, which houses the various ministries of the Government of India, including the Prime Minister's Office, is located adjacent to the Rashtrapati Bhawan; it was designed by Herbert Baker. Also designed by Baker was the Council House (now serving as the Parliament House), located on the Sansad Marg, running parallel to Queensway. Two magnificent cathedrals in the area, the Anglican Cathedral Church of the Redemption and the Catholic Sacred Heart Cathedral, were designed by Henry Medd.

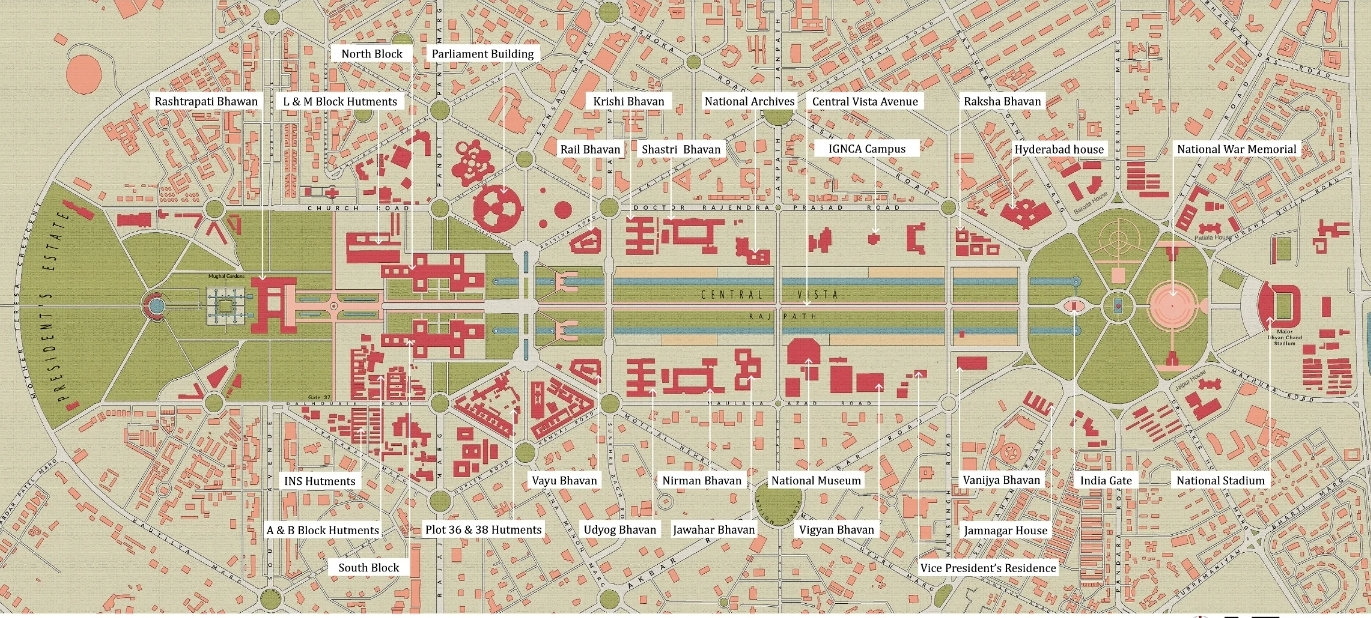
Master plan of central New Delhi as of 2021, illustrating the road and building layout

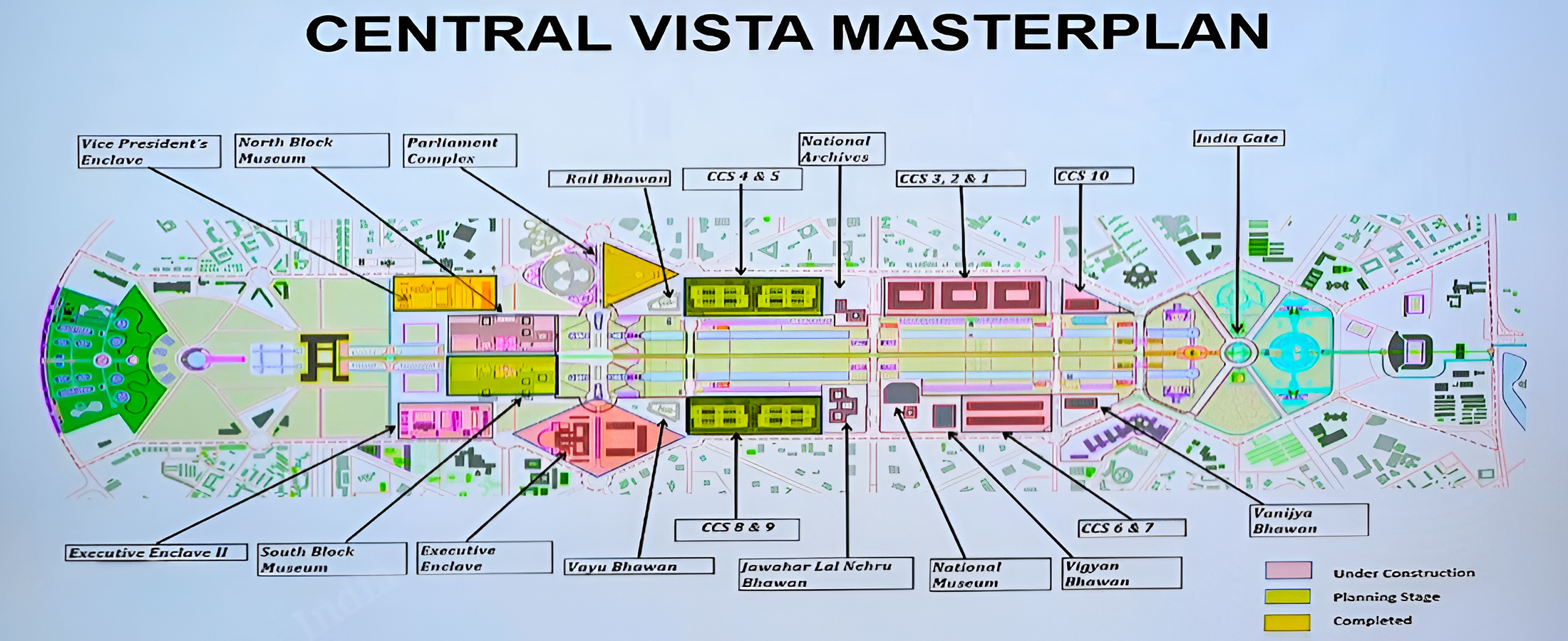
New Central Vista Masterplan as of August 2025, illustrating project statuses

== Lutyens Bungalow Zone ==
The Lutyens Bungalow Zone covers an area of about 26 km^{2}. All land and buildings in the LBZ belong to the Union Government, except for 254.5 acres (103.0 ha) that are privately possessed. This region of New Delhi is perhaps the most critical and prestigious, distinguished by its exceptional economic value. There are about 1000 bungalows in the LBZ, of which less than ten percent are in private hands.

In furtherance of devising development control norms, the Ministry of Urban Development constituted the New Delhi Redevelopment Advisory Committee (NDRAC) in 1972, when the redevelopment of the areas around the walled city, north of Connaught Place and on Prithviraj Road, was taken up.

=== Land prices ===
In 2013, it was reported that the market value of the 254.5 acres (103.0 ha) of land in private hands in the LBZ had increased eightfold in the previous ten years, from around ₹6,100 crore (US$630 million) to ₹49,000 crore (US$5.1 billion).

In June 2014, Rajiv Rattan, Indiabulls co-founder, bought a 2,920-square-yard (2,440 m^{2}) plot for ₹220 crore (US$23 million).

In December 2016, Renuka Talwar, daughter of DLF Chairman KP Singh, acquired a bungalow on Prithviraj Road for ₹435 crore (US$45 million) in one of the biggest deals for a property in Lutyens' Delhi.

=== Contiguous areas ===
Around the green expanse of the LBZ is a swathe of green, a glacis of trees, manicured lawns, and buildings, that protect and cushion it from Delhi's crowded parts: on the west is the wooded area of the Delhi Ridge, adjoining the acres of the Presidential Estate; to the west and south is Nehru Park, the Race Course, the Air force station, the Delhi Gymkhana Club, Safdarjung Airport, Safdarjang Tomb, and the Diplomatic enclave; to the south is the Lodi Gardens, with its Lodhi era tombs and remains; on the SE are the tended greens of Delhi Golf Club, with its Mughal era ruins; and beyond the Golf course, on the edge of the LBZ boundary is the green stretch of National Zoological Park, lakes, the Purana Qila, and the Humayun's Tomb. The contiguous areas are given as much care by the government as the LBZ. Those who cannot buy into the LBZ buy into the contiguous areas, like Jor Bagh, where property prices are almost as steep as in the LBZ.

== Notable residents ==
The official residence of the Prime Minister of India is at 7, Race Course Road, a complex of five bungalows, spread over 12 acres (4.9 ha). The former Prime Minister Manmohan Singh also resided there. He was allotted a Type VIII bungalow, on 3 Motilal Nehru Marg (formerly known as York Road), previously occupied by Delhi chief minister Sheila Dikshit, on 27 February 2014 by Kamal Nath Minister of Urban Development, on account of his being a Rajya Sabha MP from Assam. Sonia Gandhi and Rahul Gandhi are some of the other politicians who lived at 10, Janpath. Former Prime Ministers who are not members of Parliament (MPs) are not entitled to a government bungalow, however, Atal Bihari Vajpayee, another former Prime Minister and not a Member of any house, used to reside in a bungalow on Krishna Menon Marg from 2005 until his death in 2018.

Notable businessmen include Laxmi N Mittal, KP Singh, Sunil Mittal, C. K. Birla, Shashi and Ravi Ruia, Analjit Singh and Vijay Shekhar Sharma.

== Gallery ==
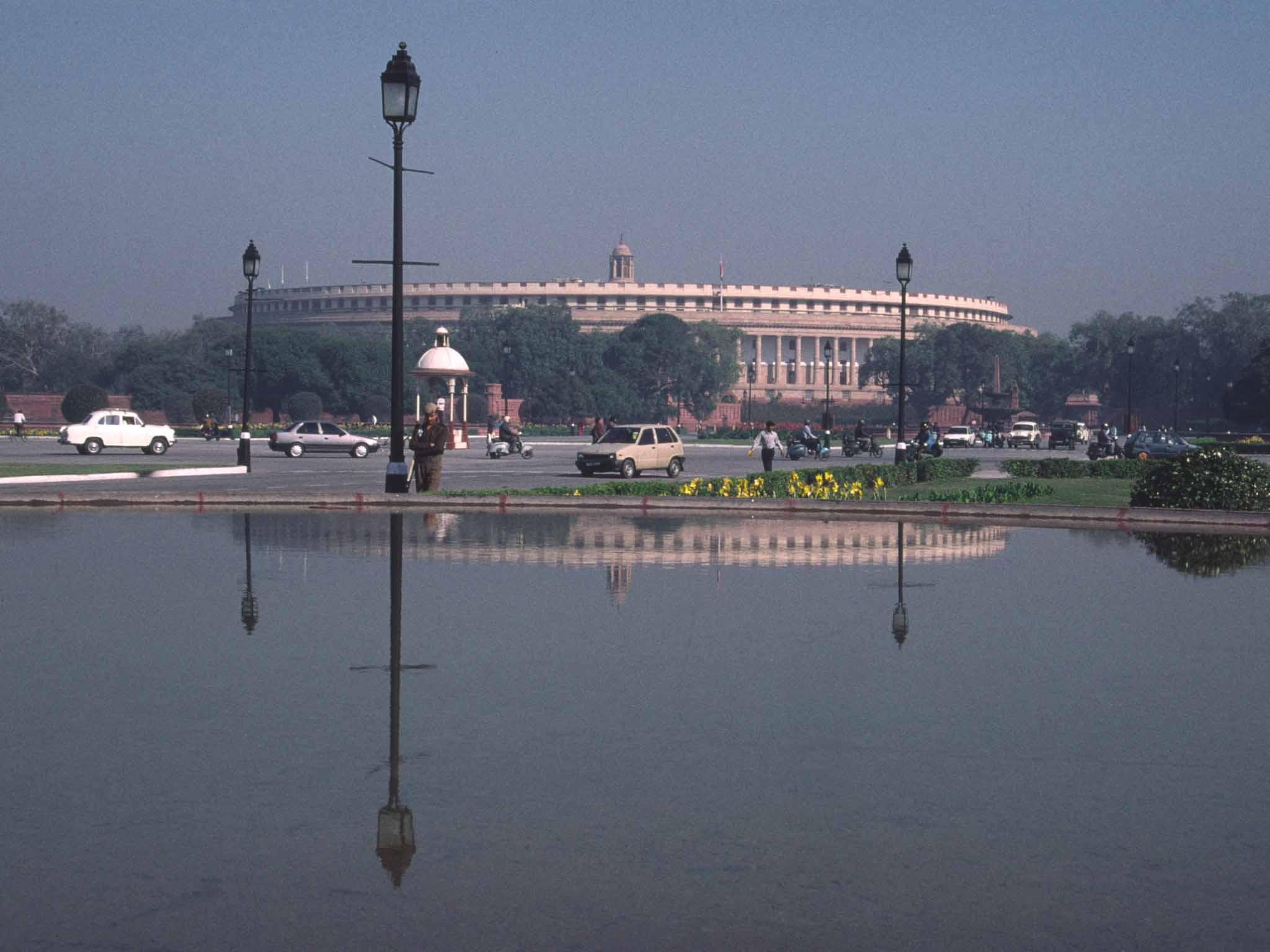
Old Parliament House

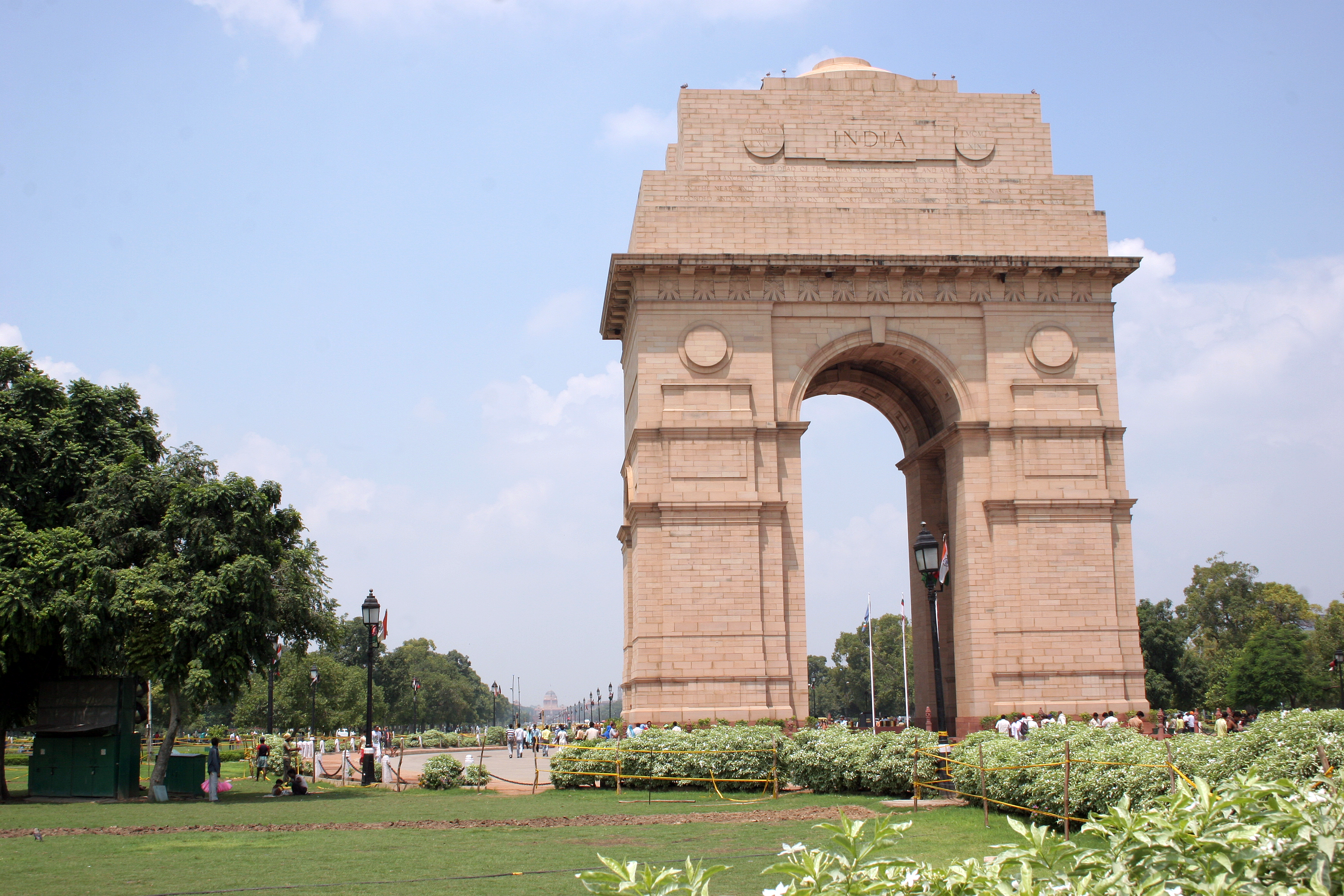
India Gate

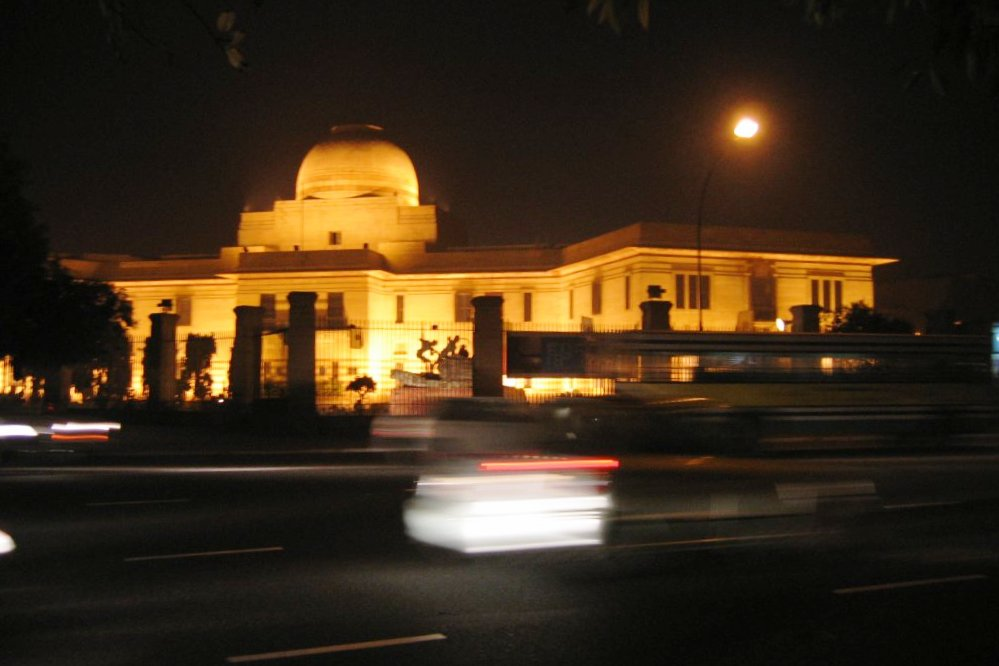
Jaipur House, which houses the National Gallery of Modern Art

== See also ==
- Beaux-Arts architecture
- Chanakyapuri
- Sunehri Bagh Masjid
- Central Vista Redevelopment Project
