= Okhla Assembly constituency =

Constituency of the Delhi legislative assembly in India

Coordinates: 28.561°N 77.287°E

Okhla
- Constituency No. 54 for the Delhi Legislative Assembly

Constituency details
- Country: India
- Region: North India
- State: Delhi
- District: South Delhi
- Lok Sabha constituency: East Delhi
- Total electors: 3,35,539 (2020)
- Reservation: None

Member of Legislative Assembly
- 8th Delhi Legislative Assembly
- Incumbent Amanatullah Khan
- Party: Aam Aadmi Party
- Elected year: 2025

The Okhla Assembly constituency is one of the seventy Delhi assembly constituencies of Delhi in northern India. The Okhla assembly constituency is a part of East Delhi (Lok Sabha constituency). Okhla Assembly includes Shaheen Bagh, Zakir Nagar, Okhla Vihar, Madanpur Khadar village, Khizrabad village, Jasola village, Aali village and Taimoor Nagar.

== Members of Legislative Assembly ==
Election	Member	Party
1993	Parvez Hashmi	Janata Dal
1998	Parvez Hashmi	Indian National Congress
2003	Parvez Hashmi	Indian National Congress
Major boundary changes
2008	Parvez Hashmi	Indian National Congress
2009 ^	Asif Muhammad Khan	Rashtriya Janata Dal
2013	Asif Muhammad Khan	Indian National Congress
2015	Amanatullah Khan	Aam Aadmi Party
2020	Amanatullah Khan	Aam Aadmi Party
2025	Amanatullah Khan	Aam Aadmi Party

- ^ : By-election held due to election of Parvez Hashmi as Rajya Sabha MP

== Election results ==
Delhi Assembly elections, 2025: Okhla
Party	Candidate	Votes	%	±%
AAP	Amanatullah Khan	88,943	42.45	−23.58
BJP	Manish Chaudhary	65,304	31.17	+1.52
AIMIM	Shifa Ur Rehman Khan	39,558	18.88	N/A
INC	Ariba Khan	12,739	6.08	+3.49
BSP	Satish Kumar	756	0.36	−0.06
NOTA	None of the above	604	0.29	−0.03
Majority		23,645	11.28	−25.10
Turnout		209,522	62.44	+3.47
AAP hold		Swing	−23.58	

=== 2020 ===
Delhi Assembly elections, 2020: Okhla
Party	Candidate	Votes	%	±%
AAP	Amanatullah Khan	130,367	66.03	+3.47
BJP	Braham Singh	58,540	29.65	+5.81
INC	Parvez Hashmi	5,123	2.59	−9.49
BSP	Dharam Singh	830	0.42	+0.01
NOTA	None of the above	637	0.32	+0.01
Majority		71,827	36.38	−2.34
Turnout		197,652	58.97	−1.97
Registered electors		335,539		
AAP hold		Swing	+3.47	

=== 2015 ===
Delhi Assembly elections, 2015: Okhla
Party	Candidate	Votes	%	±%
AAP	Amanatullah Khan	104,271	62.56	+45.51
BJP	Braham Singh	39,739	23.84	+6.86
INC	Asif Muhammad Khan	20,135	12.08	−24.26
BSP	Ashraf Kamal	696	0.41	−14.41
NOTA	None of the above	519	0.31	−0.02
Majority		64,352	38.72	+19.43
Turnout		166,702	60.94	
AAP gain from INC		Swing	+33.38	

=== 2013 ===
Delhi Assembly elections, 2013: Okhla
Party	Candidate	Votes	%	±%
INC	Asif Muhammad Khan	50,004	36.34	+14.28
AAP	Irfanullah Khan	23,459	17.05	
BJP	Dhir Singh Bidhuri	23,358	16.98	+13.86
BSP	Braham Singh	20,392	14.82	−7.96
JD(U)	Shoab Danish	9,735	7.08	
LJP	Amanatullah Khan	3,747	2.72	
SP	Amiruddin	2,395	1.74	
NOTA	None of the above	454	0.33	
Majority		26,545	19.29	+13.09
Turnout		137,632	58.33	
INC gain from RJD		Swing	+14.28	

=== 2009 By-election ===
Delhi Assembly By-election, 2009: Okhla
Party	Candidate	Votes	%	±%
RJD	Asif Muhammad Khan	23,394	28.98	+0.98
BSP	Braham Singh Bidhuri	18,387	22.78	+1.30
INC	Farhad Suri	17,804	22.06	−6.47
NCP	Rambir Singh Bidhuri	17,718	21.95	
BJP	Mohd Irfan Ahmad	2,519	3.12	−10.56
Majority		5,007	6.20	+5.67
Turnout		80,719	35.63	−13.37
RJD gain from INC		Swing	+0.98	

=== 2008 ===
Delhi Assembly elections, 2008: Okhla
Party	Candidate	Votes	%	±%
INC	Parvez Hashmi	29,303	28.53	−26.30
RJD	Asif Muhammad Khan	28,762	28.00	−0.06
BSP	Braham Singh Bidhuri	22,064	21.48	+20.23
BJP	Surender Kumar Bidhuri	14,049	13.68	−14.26
SP	Wasim Ahmed Ghazi	4,499	4.38	+7.96
LJP	Amanatullah Khan	699	0.68	
Majority		541	0.53	−26.36
Turnout		102,726	49.0	−4.91
INC hold		Swing	-26.30	

=== 2003 ===
Delhi Assembly elections, 2003: Okhla
Party	Candidate	Votes	%	±%
INC	Parvez Hashmi	29,876	54.83	−3.00
BJP	Rajpal Singh	15,227	27.94	+2.16
SP	Wasim Ahmad Ghazi	6,723	12.34	+2.30
NLP	Kabir Khan	704	1.29	+0.17
BSP	Amiruddin	682	1.25	−1.29
JD(S)	Asghar Khan	638	1.17	
Majority		12,349	26.89	+5.16
Turnout		54,491	44.09	+7.09
INC hold		Swing	-3.00	

=== 1998 ===
Delhi Assembly elections, 1998: Okhla
Party	Candidate	Votes	%	±%
INC	Parvez Hashmi	32,274	57.83	+29.96
BJP	Krishan Kumar Mehta	14,163	25.78	+2.32
SP	Asif Mohhamad Khan	5,693	10.04	+2.80
BSP	Asghar Khan	1,438	2.54	+1.75
NLP	Amiruddin	633	1.12	
JD	Ashraf Khan	534	0.94	−29.97
Majority		18,161	32.05	+29.01
Turnout		56,676	37.00	−22.90
INC gain from JD		Swing	+29.96	

=== 1993 ===
Delhi Assembly elections, 1993: Okhla
Party	Candidate	Votes	%	±%
JD	Parvez Hashmi	13,282	30.91	
INC	Hasan Ahmed	11,975	27.87	
BJP	Siraj Pracha	10,245	23.46	
SP	Ramesh Chand Tongar	3,112	7.24	
CPI	Amiruddin	1,083	2.52	
Independent	Devender Kumar	799	1.86	
Independent	Prem Chand Pahuja (Lankesh)	782	1.82	
Majority		1,307	3.04	
Turnout		42,963	52.90	
JD win (new seat)				
