= Asif Muhammad Khan =

Indian politician

Asif Muhammad Khan Former MLA

Member of the Delhi Legislative Assembly for Okhla
- In office 2009–2015
- Preceded by: Parvez Hashmi
- Succeeded by: Amanatullah Khan

Personal details
- Born: 8 February 1961 (age 65) Bulandshahr, Uttar Pradesh, India
- Party: Indian National Congress
- Spouse: Mrs. Fehmina Khan
- Relations: Arif Mohammad Khan (brother)
- Children: Ariba Khan (daughter)
- Parent: Mr. Ashfaque Mohd. Khan (father)
- Profession: Farmer & Politician

Asif Muhammad Khan (born 8 February 1961) is an Indian politician and was member of the Fourth and Fifth Legislative Assemblies of Delhi, India. He represented the Okhla constituency and is a member of the Indian National Congress.

== Early life and family ==
Asif Khan was born on 8 February 1961 in Bulandshahr, Uttar Pradesh, into a politically active family. He is the younger brother of Bihar Governor Arif Mohammad Khan. His daughter Ariba Khan is councillor of Abul Fazal ward (Okhla) in MCD since 2022.

== Career ==
Khan contested and won his first election in 1997 from the Okhla ward of Municipal Corporation of Delhi as an independent candidate. He won the election into the Municipal Council for a second term and remained a councillor till 2007. Khan then contested the 2008 Delhi Legislative Assembly Election from a Rashtriya Janta Dal ticket from Okhla but lost to Parvez Hashmi by only 541 votes. After Hashmi was nominated to the Rajya Sabha, Khan contested the 2009 by-election and became a member of the assembly. He later switched to the Indian National Congress in 2013. He went on to win the seat for a second time in the 2013 Assembly Election. Khan lost the 2015 Delhi Legislative Assembly Election and came third.
