= Sunehri Bagh Masjid =

Mosque in Delhi, India

- Urdu: سنہری باغ مسجد
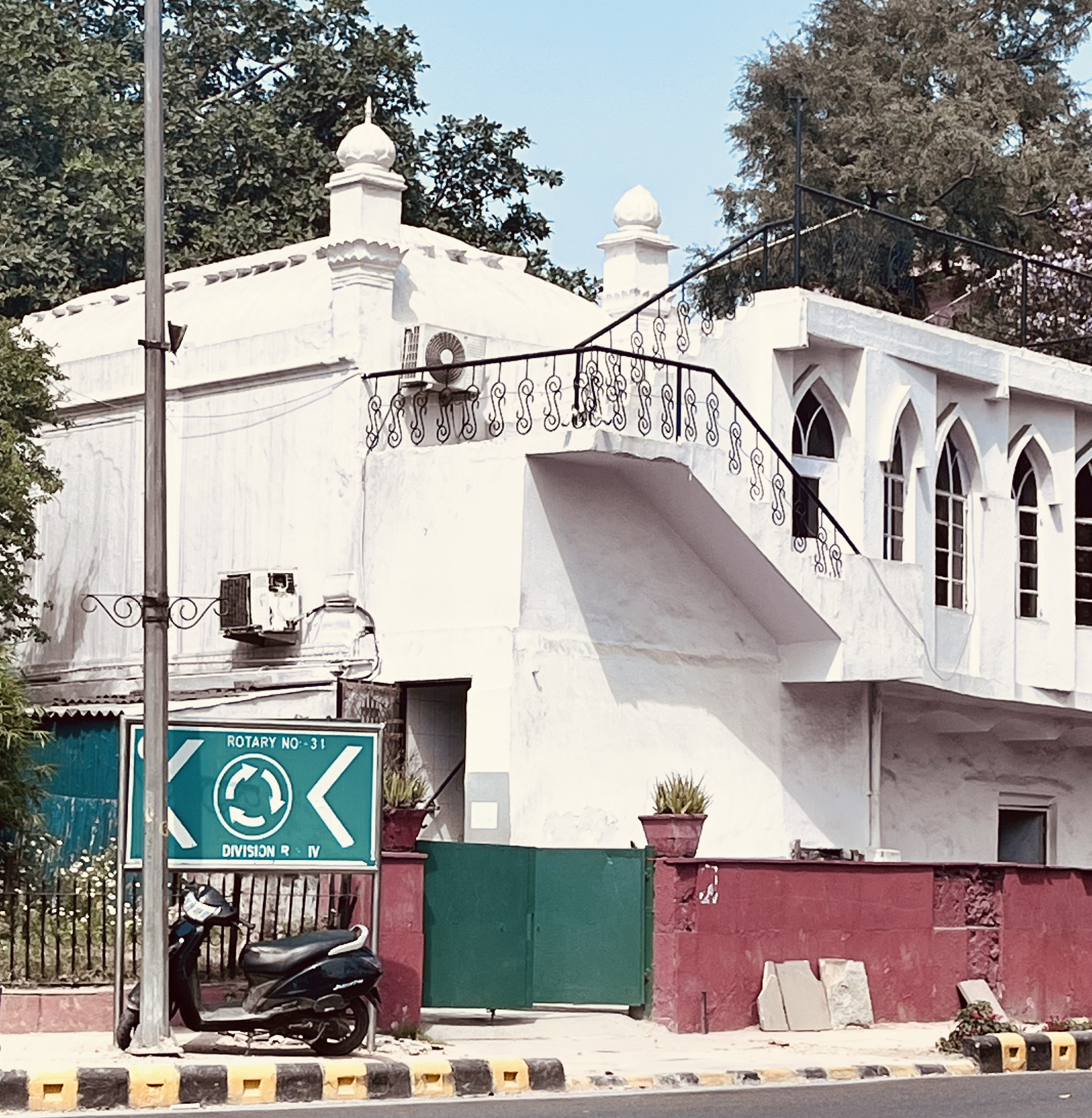
- Sunehri Bagh Masjid in 2024

- Location of the mosque in Central Delhi

Religion
- Affiliation: Islam
- Ecclesiastical or organizational status: Mosque
- Leadership: Abdul Aziz (Imam)
- Status: Active

Location
- Location: Lutyens' Delhi, NCT of Delhi
- Country: India
- Interactive map of Sunehri Bagh Masjid
- Coordinates: 28°36′37″N 77°12′43″E

Architecture
- Type: Mosque architecture
- Style: Mughal
- Completed: c. 17th century

Specifications
- Dome: One
- Minaret: Four
- Materials: Lakhori bricks

The Sunehri Bagh Masjid is a Mughal era mosque located in the Lutyens' zone of Central Delhi, India. Listed as a Grade-III heritage structure by the Archaeological Survey of India, it consists of two storeys, and comprises a Bangla dome and four minarets.

In August 2023, the New Delhi Municipal Council (NDMC) recommended that the mosque be demolished, claiming it would bolster traffic management in the area. The NDMC put their proposal for public opinions in December 2023, whereupon it courted widespread criticism from activists, historians, and organisations including the Jamiat Ulema-e-Hind and the Indian History Congress. The imam of the mosque challenged the recommendation in the Delhi High Court. During proceedings, the NDMC told the court that the notice was procedural and "nothing is going to happen to Delhi's Sunehri Bagh Masjid anytime soon".

== History ==
The Sunehri Bagh Masjid has a history of over 200 years, and predates the construction of the colonial capital of New Delhi. The mosque was constructed in the Mughal style; however, its exact construction date is unknown. According to historian Swapna Liddle, the mosque likely belongs to the 17th century, or earlier. It is located in the Lutyens' Delhi area, near Udyog Bhawan metro station.

The Lutyens' Delhi area was developed around the mosque several decades after the former's construction. The mosque survived several ravages including the colonial reconstruction of New Delhi in 1912 led by Edwin Lutyens. Notwithstanding Lutyens' disdain for subcontinental architecture, he incorporated the mosque in his plans for the new colonial capital precinct in Delhi (thereafter known as Lutyens' Delhi), retaining it by carving a traffic roundabout straddling its peripheries. A map from 1912 depicts the mosque as located within the confines of Sunehri Bagh.

The mosque housed Indian independence movement activists including Hasrat Mohani, who resided within its confines while attending Parliament sessions. The Delhi chapter of the Indian National Trust for Art and Cultural Heritage listed the mosque as a heritage building worthy of preservation, and had filed a public interest litigation to "ensure that such buildings were given legal protection", which subsequently entailed its listing as a Grade-III heritage building in a Delhi government notification dated 2009 .

== Structure ==
Sunehri Bagh Masjid is a two-storey structure. It has a Bangla dome and four minarets. The mosque has rooms in the basement that either serve as shops or homes, and a staircase leading to the prayer area. The ground floor has a park around it. It is made of Lakhori bricks.

== Demolition notice ==
Amanatullah Khan, an MLA representing Okhla in the Delhi Legislative Assembly, who was also serving as the Chairman of the Delhi Waqf Board at that time, wrote to Prime Minister on 3 June 2021 seeking his assurance that the heritage mosques in the Lutyen's area would not be touched as a part of Modi's ambitious Central Vista redevelopment project. The Delhi Waqf Board filed a plea in the Delhi High Court in July 2023, which was first heard on 5 July 2023. The court issued an interim order on 7 July 2023 maintaining the status quo, and the proceedings were closed on 18 December 2023.

In August 2023, the New Delhi Municipal Council (NDMC) recommended to the High Court a proposal warranting the removal of the mosque. NDMC had stated that the 150-year-old mosque "falls in a high-security zone where Parliament and Central government offices are located", and the removal ensured "safe and smooth flow of traffic".

NDMC issued a public notice on 24 December 2023 to seek public opinions and suggestions. It issued the notification in accordance with statements from the Delhi Traffic Police claiming that the mosque "creates traffic snarls in the area, especially on Tuesdays and Fridays." The removal proposal was found to be contradictory with a 2021 traffic study report submitted by the Central Public Works Department. The report did not find any "congestion at the roundabout then or in the near future". By 1 January 2024, NDMC had received over 85,000 responses, mainly from Muslim and minority organisations, mostly express protestations against the demolition of the mosque. Jamiat Ulema-e-Hind president Mahmood Madani wrote to Prime Minister Modi and Home Minister Amit Shah expressing reservations about the notification. He wrote in the letter that "such an action would constitute a grave loss to our shared heritage". An anonymous veteran architect quoted by Telegraph India stated, "The Sunehri Bagh Masjid is not merely a structure of bricks and mortar; it stands as a testament to our historical legacy and architectural grandeur. Its demolition would result in an irrevocable loss to the cultural fabric and collective identity of our city."

=== Delhi High Court ===
Abdul Aziz, the imam of Sunehri Bagh Masjid, lodged a petition in the Delhi High Court, challenging the NDMC's seeking public opinion, and alleged "that the notice was issued with malafide intention without any application of mind and that the structure was being targeted without any research or data to support the claim that the structure was causing traffic congestion in the area." NDMC told the court that "nothing is going to happen to Delhi’s Sunehri Bagh Masjid anytime soon", stating that the public notice was procedural, and opinions from the Heritage Conservation Committee would be heard first. The case was transferred to a double-bench on 11 January 2024.

=== Reactions from historians ===
Narayani Gupta, a historian and a retired professor of Jamia Millia Islamia University, observed that "Lutyens cleverly incorporated this little masjid into one of his roundabouts. Instead of learning from him, our present town controllers pay homage only to VIP cars", and Swapna Liddle stated that there were several other ways which could resolve the traffic problems around the mosque.

On 10 January 2024, the Indian History Congress, which comprises historians from all parts of India, issued a resolution opposing the NDMC's decision of demolition of the mosque owing to its cultural significance and history during the construction of New Delhi. The historians stated that the location of the mosque is evocative and serves as a relic.

== See also ==
- Islam in India
- List of mosques in India
