= Amanatullah Khan =

Indian politician

Member of the Delhi Legislative Assembly
- Incumbent
- Assumed office 12 February 2015
- Preceded by: Asif Muhammad Khan
- Constituency: Okhla

Personal details
- Born: 10 January 1974 (age 52) Agwanpur, Uttar Pradesh, India
- Party: Aam Aadmi Party
- Other political affiliations: Lok Jan Shakti Party
- Spouse: Shafia Khan
- Children: 2
- Profession: Businessperson; politician

Amanatullah Khan (born 10 January 1974) is an Indian politician and member of the Delhi Legislative Assembly. He is a member of the Aam Aadmi Party and represents Okhla (Assembly constituency) of Delhi in the Sixth Legislative Assembly of Delhi. Khan is the elected chairman of the Delhi Waqf Board since November 2020.

== Early life ==
Amanatullah Khan was born on 10 January 1974, in Agwanpur village, Meerut district, to Waliullah Khan. He attended the Jamia Millia Islamia but did not complete his degree. He is educated till twelfth grade, which he passed in 1992–93. He is married to Shafia Khan and has a son and a daughter.

== Political career ==
Khan had unsuccessfully contested in the 2008 Delhi Legislative Assembly election and 2013 Delhi Legislative Assembly election as a Lok Jan Shakti Party candidate. In 2013 he got 3600 votes and ended on sixth position.

Since 2015 Amanatullah Khan is a member of the Aam Aadmi Party.

=== Member of Legislative Assembly (2015–2020) ===
In 2015, he contested elections for the Legislative Assembly of Delhi and won, becoming a member of the Sixth Legislative Assembly of Delhi.

On 20 July 2016, a woman alleged that Khan's supporters threatened her after her complaint about electricity supply. She then filed a case against Khan for allegedly threatening her at the Jamia Nagar Police station in South Delhi. On 23 July Khan held a press conference and said that the woman was "pressurised" by the police to give a false statement against him. When the incident was reported, Khan said he was out of the town in Meerut on 9 and 10 July, and his children were in Kashmir on a holiday. Next day on 24 July 2016 Delhi Police arrested Khan and sent him to custody. On 28 July 2016 Khan got bail from the court as he was not required for the investigation. The Aam Aadmi Party released a video footage and a transcript of a conversation involving the complainant woman saying that, "the SHO of Jamia Nagar police station asked her to add allegations of threats — on raping and killing her — in the FIR". AAP said that other AAP MLAs were also similarly targeted like Khan in false cases by Delhi Police.

On 18 April 2017, Khan said that members of the Indian National Congress had fired guns at him in the presence of police, when members of the Congress and Aam Aami Party clashed with each other in the Jamia Nagar area ahead of local municipal elections. On 28 January 2018, two members of Congress filed assault case against Khan.

On 20 February 2018, an assault case was filed by Delhi Chief Secretary Anshu Prakash against Khan and fellow legislator Prakash Jarwal for allegedly slapping and abusing him. In 2021, a Delhi court dismissed the assault case filed by the Delhi bureaucrat against Kejriwal and ten AAP MLAs and discharged them of all charges. The court noted that "no prima facie case" was made against them.

=== Member of Legislative Assembly (2020-2025) ===
In 2020 he defeated Braham Singh of BJP by a margin of 71,664 votes in the 2020 Delhi Legislative Assembly elections. Since 2025, he is an elected member of the 8th Delhi Assembly. His term as MLA in the Seventh Legislative Assembly of Delhi is his second term.

In April 2020, a video of man assaulting a 14 year old child at Dasna temple in UP had gone viral. Yati Narsinghand Saraswati, chief priest of Dasna Devi temple, released a video supporting the assaulter and also made disparaging comments against Prophet Muhammad. Khan filed a police complaint at Jamia Nagar police station against Saraswati for "hurting religious sentiments". He said, "There are uncouth words that are below the standards of being repeated. It is needless to say that such statements for cheap publicity and personal gain hurts sentiments of Muslims at large. Yati Narsinghanand Saraswati with all his knowledge and intention has hurt religious sentiments of the Muslim community not only in India, but all the over the world." Khan had posted a reaction video where he was seen calling for Narsinghand's beheading and cutting off his tongue, followed by a statement that even though his words call for beheading, "we have faith in the Constitution and the law and we hope an FIR will be registered against him and he will be sent to jail". Later a police complaint was filed against Khan for allegedly threatening Narsinghand.

Khan had publicly criticised the Bharatiya Janata Party led Union government. In May 2022, the BJP led Municipal body in Delhi had organised a drive where structures were destroyed with bulldozers (backhoe). Khan led protests against the demolition drive and was arrested for the same. He was released on bail next day.

Committee assignments of Delhi Legislative Assembly

- Chairman (2020-2022), Committee on Welfare of Minorities
- Member (2020-2022), General Purposes Committee
- Member (2020-2022), Committee on the issues related to Unauthorised Colonies
- Member (2020-2023), Committee on Government Undertakings
- Member (2022-2023), Library Committee
- Member (2022-2023), Committee on Ethics
- Member (2022-2023), Committee on Welfare of Minorities
- Member (2022-2023), House Committee on Violation of Protocol Norms and Contemptuous Behaviour By Government Officers with MLAs - (Elected by the House)

He was re-elected in 2025 defeating BJP candidate Manish Chaudhary by a margin of 23,645 votes.

== History of arrests ==
In 2016 Khan was arrested for allegedly threatening a woman with rape and murder. The charges were dropped by a Delhi judge in 2019, due to inconsistent evidence. In March 2022, the Delhi Police opened a "history sheet" on Khan in which he was described a "bad character", with the internal police document quickly made available to the press. The Supreme Court ruled in 2024 that this document should not have been brought into the public domain, and that in future history sheets must not be leaked to the press under pain of legal sanction.

On 16 September 2022, he was arrested again in a corruption case involving the Delhi Waqf Board. After being detained for several days, he was released on bail on 28 September 2022. He was arrested again in 2024 by the Enforcement Directorate for financial irregularities and alleged illegal recruitment of staff within the Delhi Waqf Board during his tenure as the chairman between 2018 and 2022.

In February 2025, Amanatullah Khan was granted protection from arrest in a case related to an attack on a Delhi Police team. The case involved accusations of obstructing a government official, criminal assault and helping a proclaimed offender, an accused in an attempt-to-murder case, to escape from custody. Later it was reported that Amanatullah Khan can also face legal trouble as the police considered invoking the Maharashtra Control of Organised Crime Act (MCOCA) against him. Multiple raids were conducted across various states as part of the investigation. The case was linked to allegations of illegal activities and organised crime.

== Controversies ==
Confrontation with Reporter (2025)

Amanatullah Khan, the AAP MLA from Okhla, was involved in a public controversy in January 2025 when he reportedly threatened a journalist. The incident occurred after the reporter confronted Khan over his son's misbehavior with Delhi Police officers during a routine patrol. The reporter questioned Khan on whether he felt ashamed of his son’s behaviour, which reportedly included refusing to provide a driving licence and identification when asked by the police.

In response, Khan defended his son, accusing the Station House Officer (SHO) of recording and making the incident viral. He further criticised the news channel, labelling it as biased and aligned with the Bharatiya Janata Party (BJP). The situation escalated when Khan, visibly agitated, was caught on video threatening the reporter, saying, "Tereko itna marunga, chala ja yahan se" (I'll beat you so badly, leave from here).

Alleged Misbehavior by Son

The controversy began when Khan’s son’s motorcycle was impounded by Delhi Police during a patrol for traffic violations and misbehavior with officers. Reports suggest that his son refused to cooperate, claiming no need to provide identification or a driving licence. He allegedly called Khan during the altercation, handing the phone to the Station House Officer (SHO). Following the incident, the bike was brought to the police station, and a challan was issued under multiple violations.

These events sparked widespread media coverage, with critics highlighting Khan's conduct as inappropriate for a public representative, while his supporters defended him against what they termed political targeting.

== Electoral performance ==
Delhi Assembly elections, 2008: Okhla
Party	Candidate	Votes	%	±%
INC	Parvez Hashmi	29,303	28.53	−26.30
RJD	Asif Muhammad Khan	28,762	28.00	−0.06
BSP	Braham Singh Bidhuri	22,064	21.48	+20.23
BJP	Surender Kumar Bidhuri	14,049	13.68	−14.26
SP	Wasim Ahmed Ghazi	4,499	4.38	+7.96
LJP	Amanatullah Khan	699	0.68	
Majority		541	0.53	−26.36
Turnout		102,726	49.0	−4.91
INC hold		Swing	-26.30	

Delhi Assembly elections, 2013: Okhla
Party	Candidate	Votes	%	±%
INC	Asif Muhammad Khan	50,004	36.34	+14.28
AAP	Irfanullah Khan	23,459	17.05	
BJP	Dhir Singh Bidhuri	23,358	16.98	+13.86
BSP	Braham Singh	20,392	14.82	−7.96
JD(U)	Shoab Danish	9,735	7.08	
LJP	Amanatullah Khan	3,747	2.72	
SP	Amiruddin	2,395	1.74	
NOTA	None of the above	454	0.33	
Majority		26,545	19.29	+13.09
Turnout		137,632	58.33	
INC gain from RJD		Swing	+14.28	

Delhi Assembly elections, 2015: Okhla
Party	Candidate	Votes	%	±%
AAP	Amanatullah Khan	104,271	62.56	+45.51
BJP	Braham Singh	39,739	23.84	+6.86
INC	Asif Muhammad Khan	20,135	12.08	−24.26
BSP	Ashraf Kamal	696	0.41	−14.41
NOTA	None of the above	519	0.31	−0.02
Majority		64,352	38.72	+19.43
Turnout		166,702	60.94	
AAP gain from INC		Swing	+33.38	

Delhi Assembly elections, 2020: Okhla
Party	Candidate	Votes	%	±%
AAP	Amanatullah Khan	130,367	66.03	+3.47
BJP	Braham Singh	58,540	29.65	+5.81
INC	Parvez Hashmi	5,123	2.59	−9.49
BSP	Dharam Singh	830	0.42	+0.01
NOTA	None of the above	637	0.32	+0.01
Majority		71,827	36.38	−2.34
Turnout		197,652	58.97	−1.97
Registered electors		335,539		
AAP hold		Swing	+3.47	

=== 2025 ===
Delhi Assembly elections, 2025: Okhla
Party	Candidate	Votes	%	±%
AAP	Amanatullah Khan	88,943	42.45	
BJP	Manish Chaudhary	65,304	31.17	
AIMIM	Shifa Ur Rehman Khan	39,558	18.88	
INC	Ariba Khan	12,739	6.08	
BSP	Satish Kumar	756	0.36	
NOTA	None of the above	604	0.29	
Majority		23,645	11.28	
Turnout		2,09,522		
AAP hold		Swing		

State Legislative Assembly
Preceded by Asif Muhammad Khan	Member of the Delhi Legislative Assembly from Okhla Assembly constituency 2015–	Incumbent
