= St. Stephen's Church, Delhi =

Coordinates: 28.65914°N 77.2232°E

Cathedral Church of the Redemption
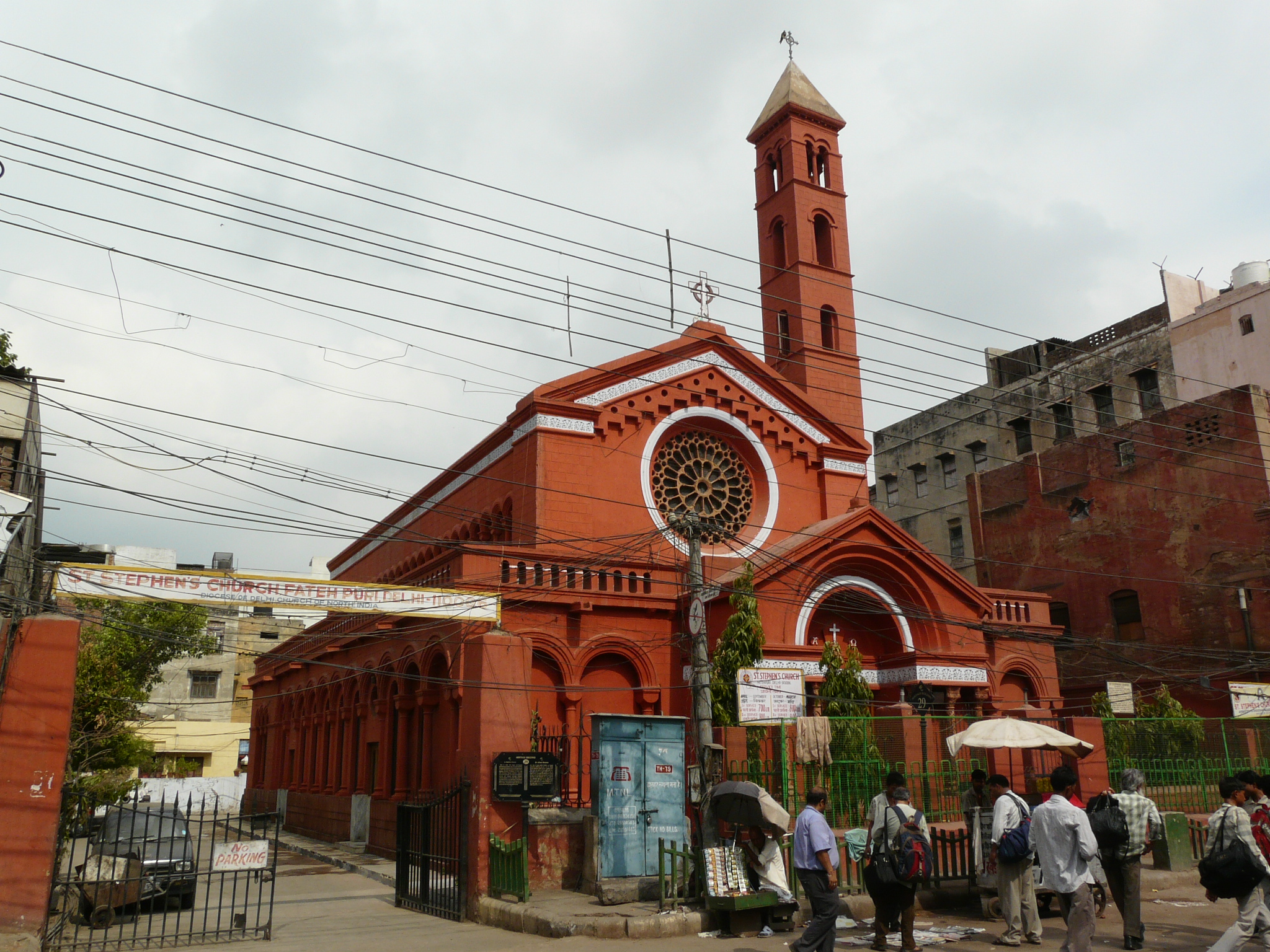
- St. Stephen's Church, Delhi
- Cathedral Church of the Redemption
- Location: St. Stephen's Church ( C.N.I ), Fatehpuri, 18, Church Mission Rd, Katra Ghel, Khari Baoli, Chandni Chowk,Old Delhi, Delhi 110006
- Country: India
- Denomination: Church of North India
- Churchmanship: High Church

Architecture
- Functional status: Active
- Years built: 1867; 159 years ago

Administration
- Diocese: Diocese of Delhi

St. Stephen's Church is located on Church Mission Road in Old Delhi. The church was built in 1862, by Anglican missionaries and DPW Engineers in the style of Italian Gothic architecture. It is part of Church of North India Diocese of Delhi.

== Architecture ==
The Church is typical Gothic style architecture, the Church is highly influenced by the Romanesque architecture Apart from its ornate walls and ceilings the Church has a unique feature which is the stained glass rose window which is exclusive in Delhi. The baroque styled church has arched windows which allow the sunlight to brighten the interiors. the interiors are well maintained with motifs, pictures, carvings and beautiful furniture. A series of fine plasters form arcade on either side with lined columns made of sandstone. These columns have beautiful carvings.

== History ==
The organization responsible for the building of St. Stephen's Church was the Anglican mission Society for the Propagation of the Gospel. Much of the work of the Society for the Propagation of the Gospel in India was later supported by the Cambridge Mission to Delhi. The color of the Church is said to symbolize the blood of St. Stephen, the first Christian Martyr and patron saint of the city, and also the blood of the first Christian martyrs in India who were killed in Delhi in 1857 revolt.

== Churches in Delhi ==
- Central Baptist Church (Delhi)
- Cathedral Church of the Redemption
- Sacred Heart Cathedral, New Delhi
- St. James' Church, Delhi
