= Henry Medd =

British architect (1892–1977)

Henry Alexander Nesbitt Medd
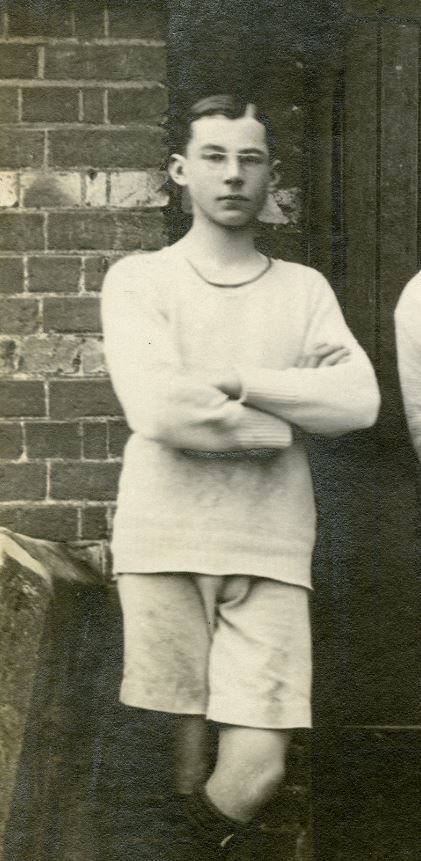
- Henry Alexander Nesbitt Medd pictured in the Abingdon School first IV rowing team
- Born: 21 September 1892; North Cerney
- Died: 26 October 1977 (aged 85); Lambeth

Henry Alexander Nesbitt Medd OBE FRIBA (21 September 1892 – 26 October 1977), was a British-born architect, whose career was made in India. He is most known for being in the team of architects, team led by Edwin Lutyens and Herbert Baker, which designed the new capital of India, New Delhi (1911–1931). Post inauguration of New Delhi, when most of architects left, he stayed on, designed many more buildings and eventually remained, Chief Architect to the Government of India (1939–47).

== Early life and education ==
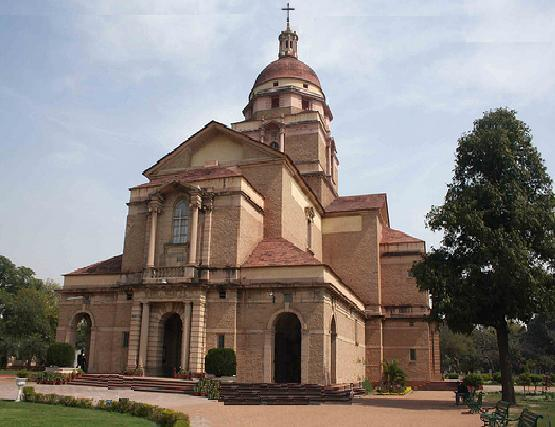
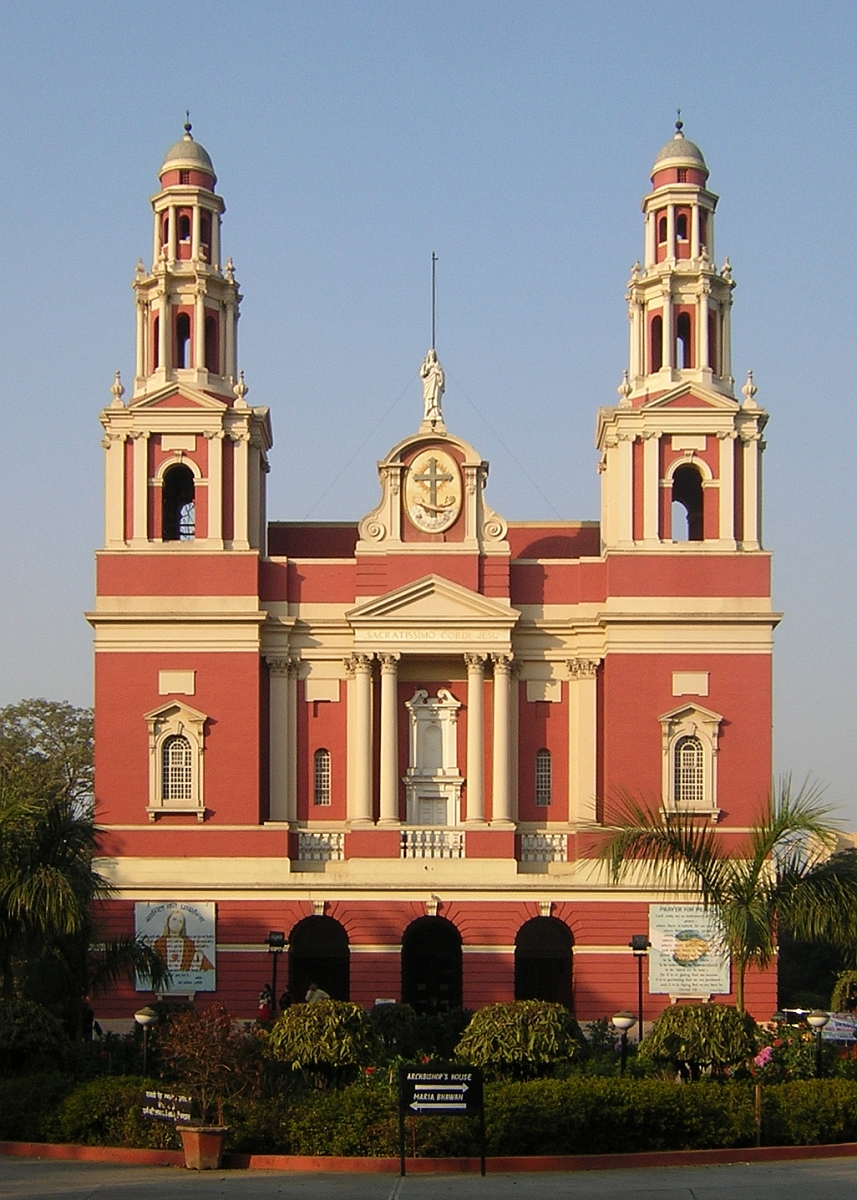
Cathedral Church of the Redemption and Sacred Heart Cathedral, New Delhi, both designed by Medd

Son of the Reverend Canon Peter Medd of North Cerney, Cirencester, a founder of Keble College, Oxford, Henry Medd was a Young and Summers Scholar at Abingdon School, from 1906 to 1910. He was a keen sportsman at Abingdon, rowing bow for the first IV, for which he received Colours. He was a 2nd XI footballer, was a competent gymnast and enjoyed debating.

== Career ==
He was articled to F. C. Eden (1911) and entered the office of Sir Edwin Lutyens (1915). The team included, apart from him, architects like Robert Tor Russell, William Henry Nicholls, C. G. Blomfield, Walter Sykes George, F. B. Blomfield and Arthur Gordon Shoosmith, which designed numerous buildings in Lutyens' Delhi.

He was Sir Herbert Baker's representative in New Delhi (1919–31) and designed the Cathedral Church of the Redemption and the Sacred Heart Cathedral, New Delhi (1927–28). He designed law courts at Nagpur (1937) and was Chief Architect to the Government of India (1939–47).

He was elected Master of the Art Workers' Guild in 1959.

== See also ==
- List of Old Abingdonians
