= Cathedral Church of the Redemption =

Coordinates: 28.618038°N 77.201978°E

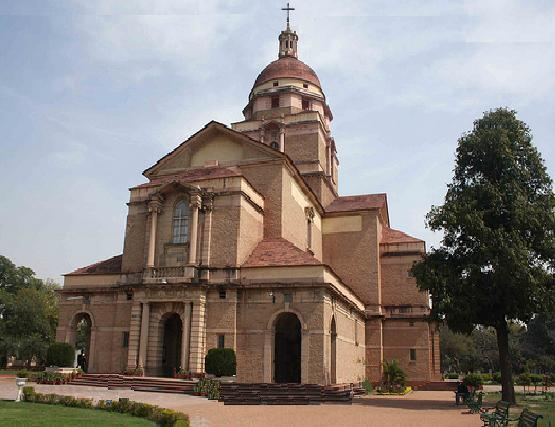
- Cathedral Church of the Redemption
- Cathedral Church of the Redemption
- Location: New Delhi
- Country: India
- Denomination: Church of North India
- Churchmanship: High Anglican

History
- Status: Cathedral

Architecture
- Functional status: Active
- Architect: Henry Medd
- Years built: 1927–1931

Administration
- Diocese: Church of North India diocese of Delhi

Cathedral Church of the Redemption, also known as the Viceroy Church, is a church in New Delhi, India, that was built between 1927 and 1931. The church is located east of Parliament House and Rashtrapati Bhavan, formerly the Viceroy's House, which was used by the then British Viceroy. The cathedral serves the Delhi diocese of the Church of North India (CNI).

The church derives its name from Palladio's Church of Il Redentore in Venice.

== Architecture ==
The building was designed by Henry Medd. The cathedral was built in such a manner that even in the extreme summers it remains cool and serene. The church has beautifully curved high arches and delicate domes, which won the heart of the then Viceroy Lord Irwin.

== Archives ==
The church since its inception on 18 January 1936, has been particular in maintaining all its records and minutes of its meetings, and is the proud owner of a 1733 Cambridge Press published Bible, bound in red leather. Its first service was held on 3 December 1922 at 8 am. and the earliest recorded wedding solemnized, was that of Adelbert Vere and Mina Monica (a widow), by Chaplain T.H. Dixon on 20 October 1926. On 4 March 1923, Chaplain T.H. Dixon officiated at the first baptism of baby David Herbert. Sixty-four year old Mary Digoll's funeral service was the first conducted by A.N. Till, the Chaplain of Delhi, on 27 November 1925.

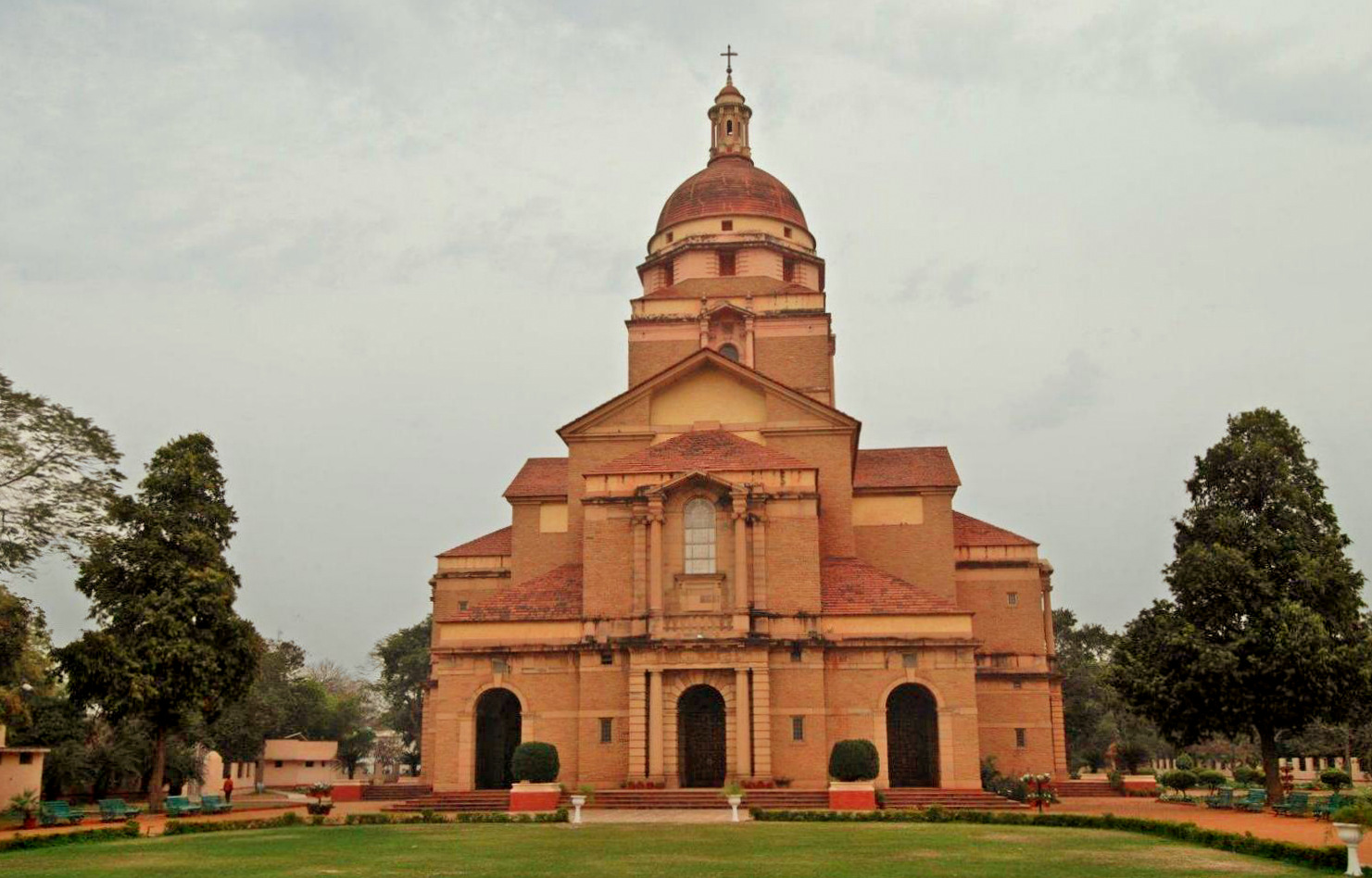
Cathedral Church of the Redemption

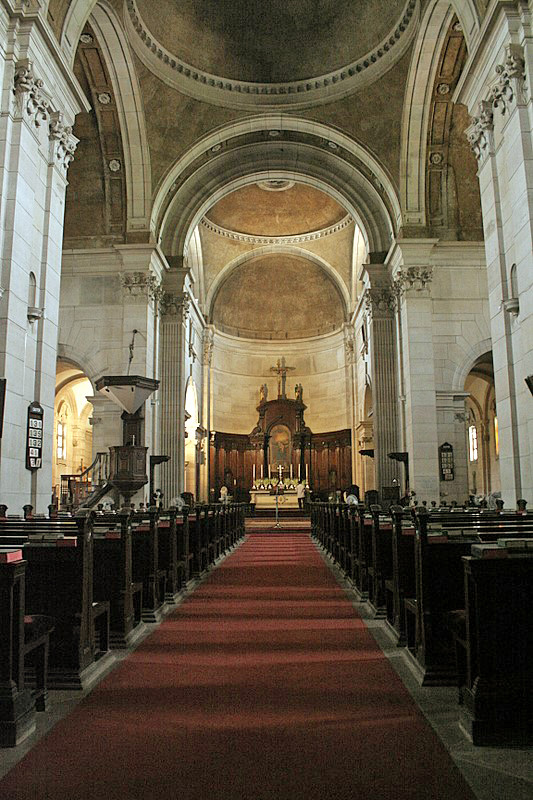
Inside view of Cathedral Church of the Redemption

== Education and Health ==
The Cathedral Church of the Redemption serves the community through its activities in education and health. The music of the church is still on its organ built in 1931. Notable organists who have played on the organ since its inception, were Sergeant Desmond Pye, Arthur Mahinder who played for thirty-two years and Bobby Chandy.

Among the many prestigious institutions under the diocese are:

- St. Stephen's College, Delhi
- St. Thomas School
- Queen Mary's School
- The Victoria School
- St Stephen's Hospital, Delhi and the LPCEF

== Churches in Delhi ==
- St. Stephen's Church, Delhi
- Central Baptist Church (Delhi)
- Sacred Heart Cathedral, New Delhi
- St. James' Church, Delhi
