= St. James' Church, Delhi =

Coordinates: 28.665637°N 77.230784°E

St. James' Church
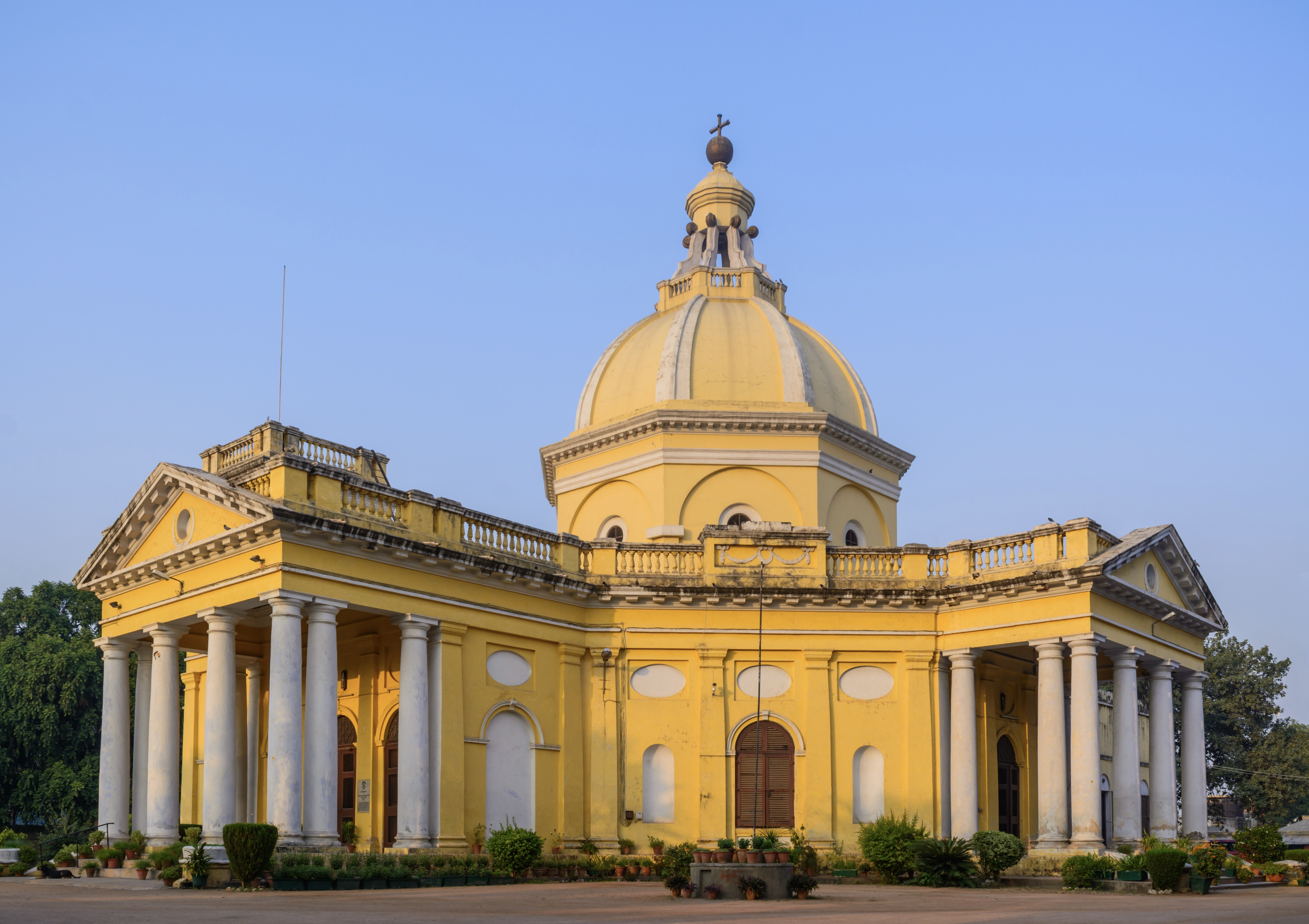
- St. James' Church, Delhi
- St. James' Church
- Location: Lothiyan Marg, Kashmere Gate, Delhi, 110006
- Country: India
- Denomination: Church of North India

History
- Founded: 1836; 190 years ago

Architecture
- Functional status: Active

Administration
- Diocese: Diocese of Delhi

St. James' Church (also known as Skinner's Church) is a colonial-era church located in Old Delhi, India. It was once the official church of the British Viceroy of India. The building, which was built in 1836 for James Skinner, is one of the oldest churches in the city. It remains part of the Church of North India Diocese of Delhi.

During the period of British India, the Viceroy of India attended services at the church until the Cathedral Church of the Redemption was built near the Gurdwara Rakab Ganj Sahib in 1931. St. James' Church is situated near Kashmiri Gate, at the intersection of Church Road and Lothian Road. The only other church from this era is St. Stephen's Church, near Fatehpuri Market in Old Delhi, which was built in 1867. A bungalow belonging to the influential British India civil servant, William Fraser is behind the church; his remains are also buried in the church's graveyard.

== History ==
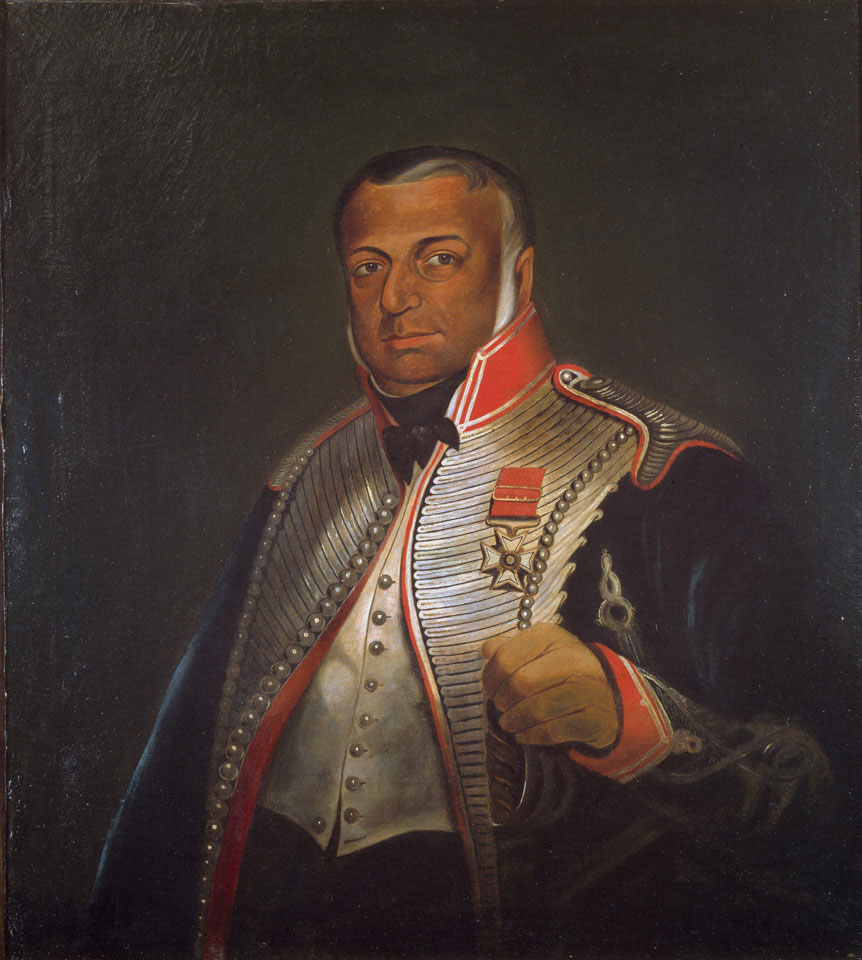
James Skinner (Sikandar Sahib), founder of the church.

Subsequently, he built the edifice at his own expense of 95,000 Rupees, under the design of Major Robert Smith. The construction started in 1826, and was completed in 1836. The basic design of Renaissance Revival style church is on a cruciform plan (Greek Cross), with three porticoed porches, elaborate stained glass windows and a central octagonal dome, similar to that of the Florence Cathedral in Italy. It was consecrated on 21 November 1836 by the bishop of Calcutta Daniel Wilson.

John Mitchley Jennings took over the edifice after Skinner.

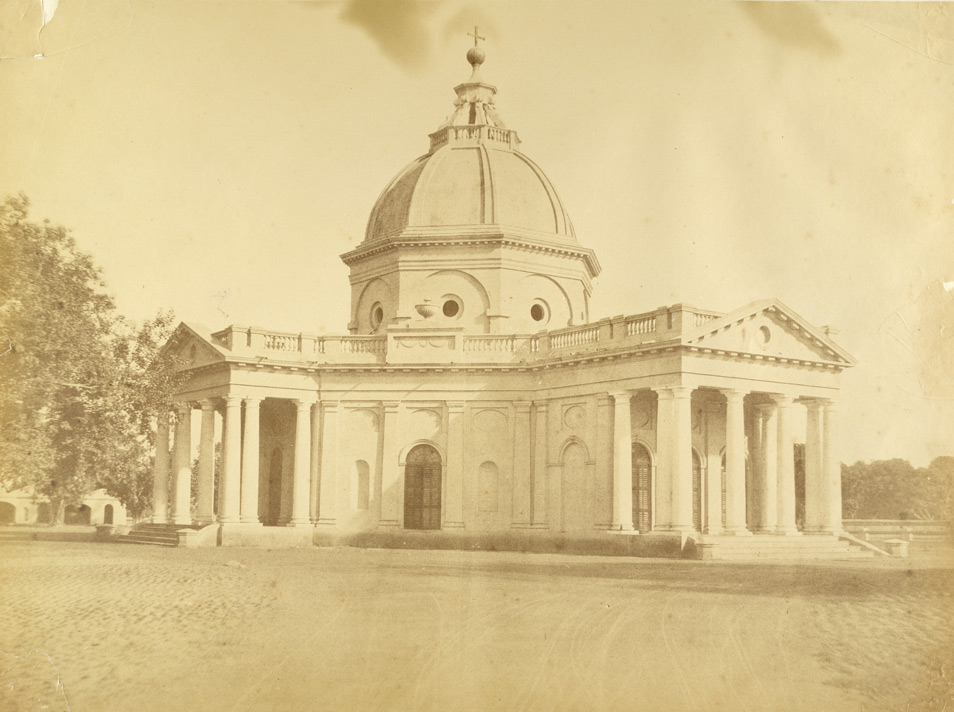
Skinner's Church c. 1858 photographed by Harriet and Robert Christopher Tytler

The copper ball and cross on the top, which are said to be replica of a church in Venice, were damaged during the 1857 revolt, and were later replaced. A special service was held in 2003, to commemorate 200 years of Skinner's Horse, the cavalry regiment raised by Skinner in 1803. Amongst those present were Margaret Skinner, great-great-granddaughter-in-law of Skinner, Admiral Sushil Kumar, retired Chief of Naval Staff, Col. Douglas Gray who commanded Skinner's Horse from 1935 to 1947, and several former British officers.

== Architecture ==
The church features "original European stained-glass windows depicting the crucifixion, ascension of Christ and his resurrection, a painting titled 'The Prodigal Son', original work of Italian painter Pompeo Batoni, a processional cross gifted by Edward Wood, 1st Earl of Halifax, a rare pipe organ gifted by Ralph T. Coe in 1899, and the church bell". All are in the process of restoration, including the church itself, scheduled for 2017, as the church due to its historical significance, falls under Grade II heritage buildings category.

== Graves ==
The church houses several tombs. One houses the remains of the British Commissioners of Delhi, William Fraser, near the large Memorial Cross erected in memory of the victims of 1857 revolt. At the rear is the tomb of Thomas Metcalfe, who lived in Delhi from 1813 to 1853, serving as Agent to Governor General of India and a Commissioner.

Skinner died at Hansi on 4 December 1841 at the age of 64, and was first buried there. Later he was disinterred, and buried in Skinner's Church on 19 January 1842 in a vault of white marble immediately below the Communion Table. North of the church lies the family plot, Skinner family, where many of his fourteen wives and many children, are buried, the burial in this place was that of a lady who died in England, but wished that her ashes be interred here.

The parish of St. James's also owns and manages the nearby Nicholson Cemetery.

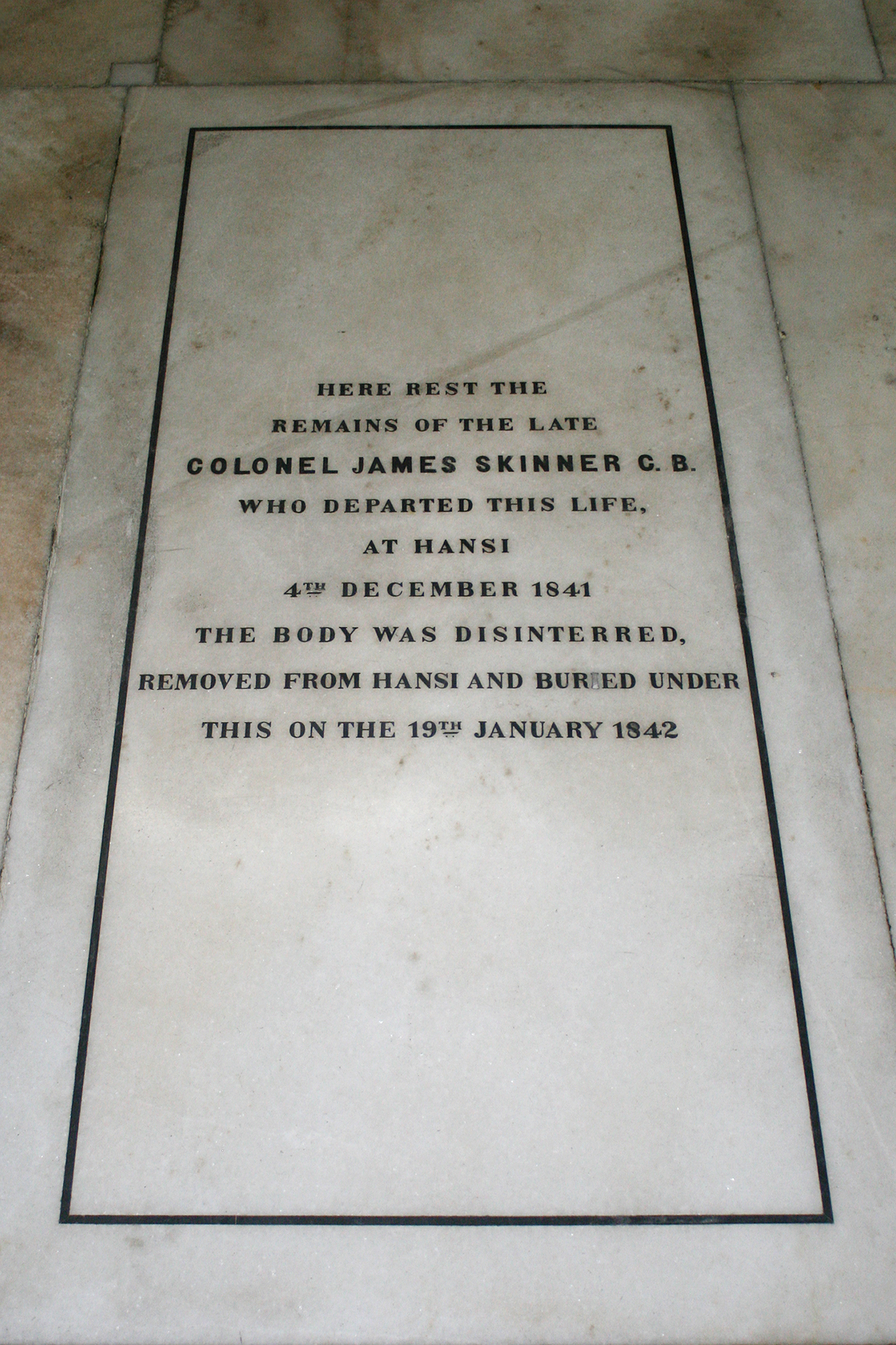
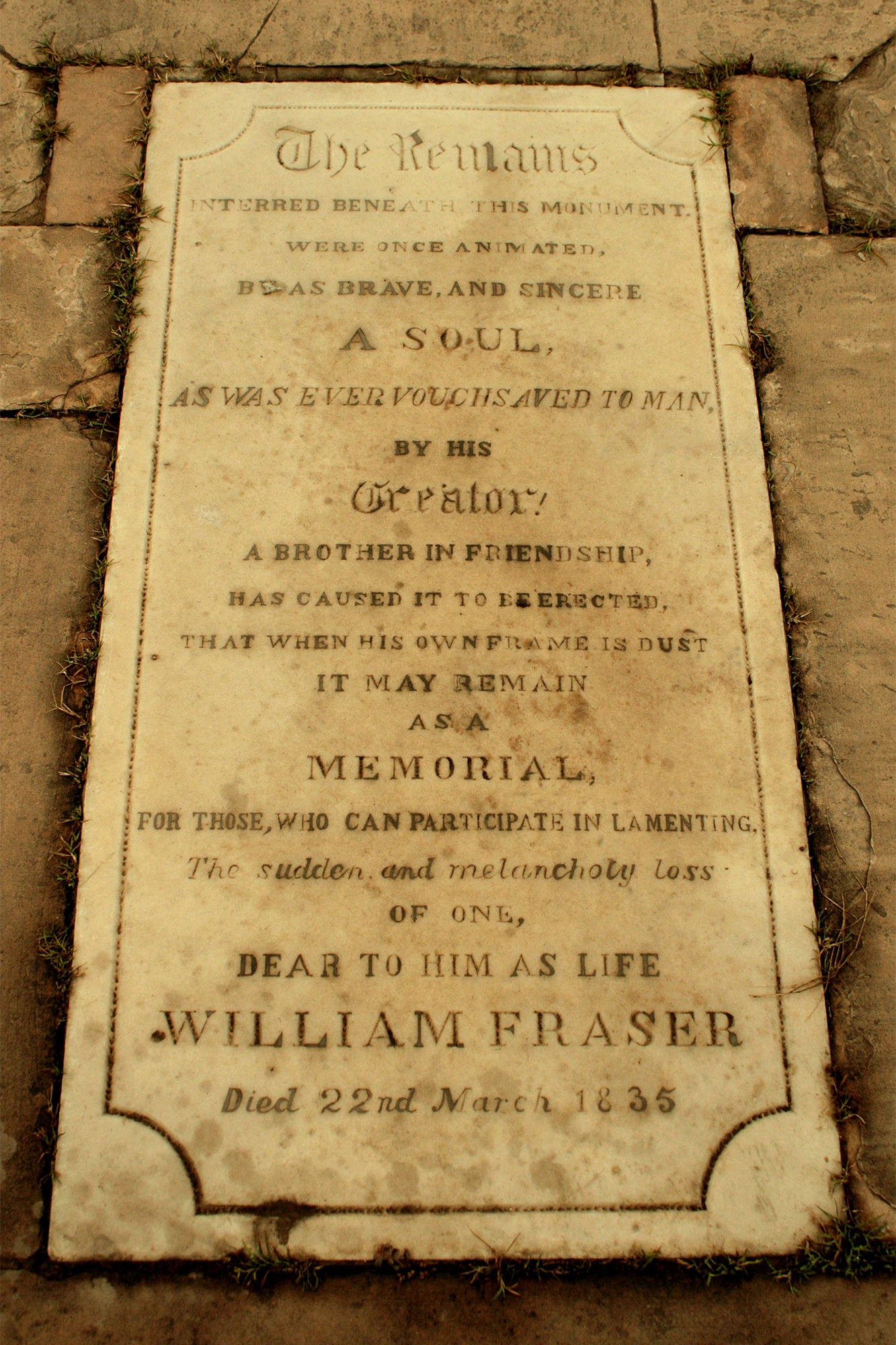
The graves of Colonel James Skinner (left) and William Fraser (right) in St. James' Church, Delhi

== Services ==
- Winter (October – March): Worship starts 9 a.m.
- Summer (April – September): Worship starts 8:30 a.m.
