= Delhi Waqf Board =

State level statutory body

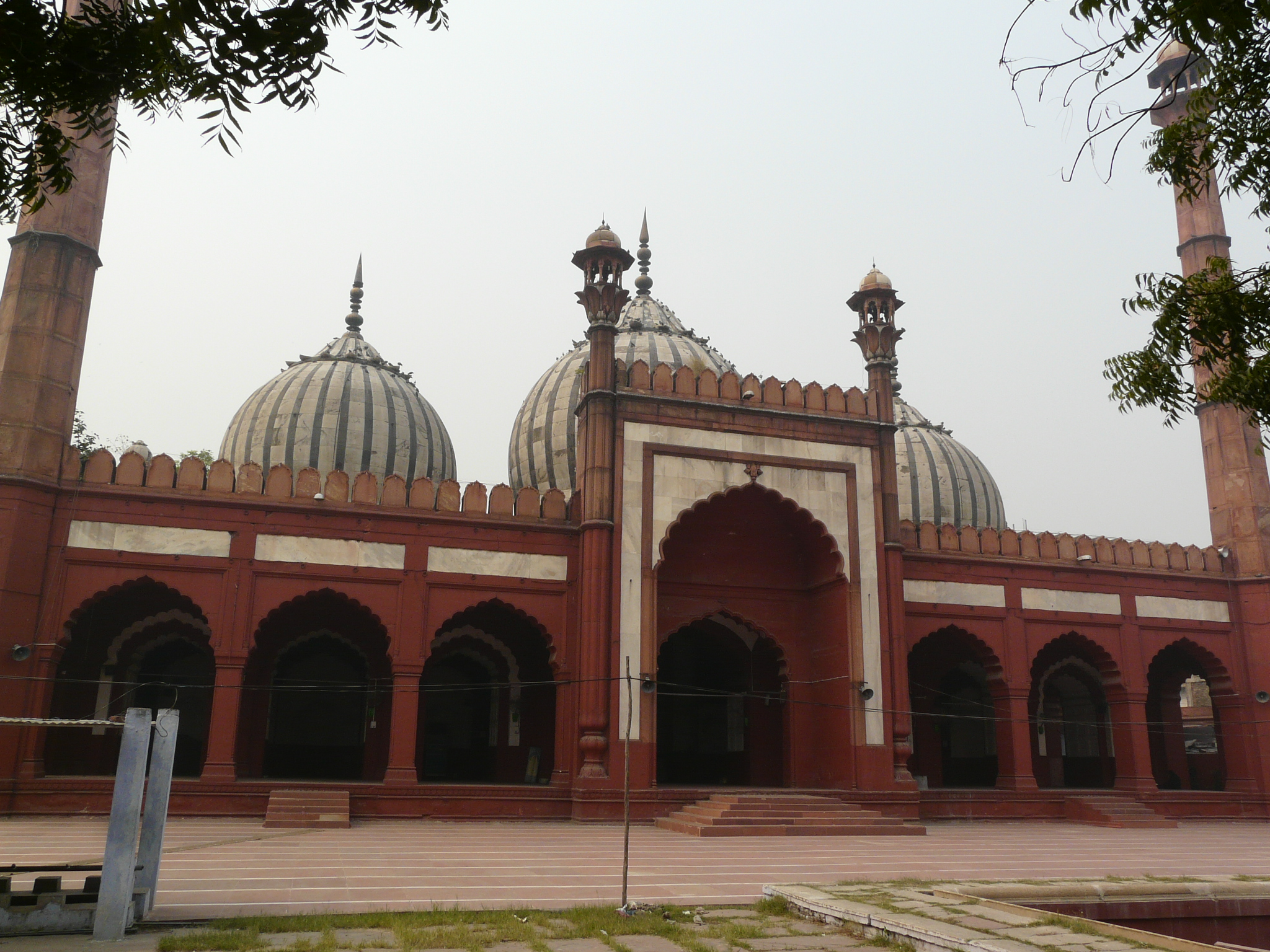
- The Zeenat-ul-Masajid, a Sunni mosque administered by the Waqf Board
- Predecessor: Sunni Majlis Auqaf
- Type: Statutory body
- Purpose: Management of Islamic waqf
- Location: Delhi, India
- Origins: Wakf Act 1954 (since repealed); Waqf Act 1995
- Region served: Delhi NCT
- Owner: Government of Delhi
- Administrator: Shri Ashwani Kumar, IAS
- CEO: Shri Azimul Haque, IAS
- Parent organisation: Central Waqf Council

The Delhi Waqf Board (Note: Sometimes Delhi Wakf Board.) is a statutory body of the Government of Delhi, initially appointed under the Indian Wakf Act 1954; now the Waqf Act 1995. It exercises control over Islamic mosques, dargahs, mausoleums, khankahs, madrasas, hospitals, and any other Islamic waqfs. The primary function of the Waqf Board is to ensure its properties and revenue are appropriately managed and used. The Board manages, regulates, and protects the waqf properties by constituting district committees, Tehsil committees, and committees for the individual institutions.

The Delhi Waqf Board is a statutory body corporate with perpetual succession and a common seal. It has the power to acquire and hold property. In the case that more than fifteen per cent of the total number of waqf property is Shia waqf, or the income thereof is more than fifteen per cent, the Act envisages a separate Shia Waqf Board is formed.

== Overview of waqf ==
According to Islamic laws, the ultimate owner of a waqf property is Allah, not any individual or the government. Any organisation appointed or set up by the government for waqf properties can only manage the waqf, or act as trustee of waqf properties. Once a property is waqfed, it will always remain a waqf property. A waqf is typically an act of charity.

== Board members ==
There are seven members of the present Board:

- Mr. Amanatullah Khan (Chairman)
- Mr. Himal Akhtar (member)
- Mr. Azimul Haque (member)
- Mr. Parvez Hashmi (member)
- Mr. Ch. Shareef Ahmad (member)
- Ms. Naeem Fatima Kazmi (member)

The Chief Executive Officer of the Board since January 2025, is Azimul Haque.

=== Composition and first meeting ===
The members are nominated from different quotas, for e.g. mutawalli (caretaker) Quota, MLA/MP Quota, and Bar Council Quota. In total there are at least six members. After the appointment of members of a newly constituted Board notified under section 13, the Delhi State Government shall, as soon as may arrange to fix, by giving to the members not less than ten clear days' notice, a date for the first meeting of the Board which shall be for the election of chairman.

== Controversies ==
In an RTI filed by Ajay Bose, in 2022 it was revealed that Delhi Waqf Board received over 100 crores in seven years from Delhi Government as Grant in Aid.

In 2024, former Chairman, Amanatullah Khan, was arrested by the Enforcement Directorate for financial irregularities and alleged illegal recruitment of staff within the Delhi Waqf Board during his tenure as the chairman between 2018 and 2022.

=== Dispute over waqf ownership ===
In 2023, a dispute arose regarding 123 properties, some of which are located in the Mehrauli Archaeological Park. The properties originate from the time of the British Raj and the Board's predecessor, the Sunni Majlis Auqaf. The properties were gazetted as waqf by the Delhi Government in 1970; however, the Delhi Development Authority, and the Land and Development Office of the Ministry of Housing and Urban Affairs contested the gazettal. Following a Union Government review, it was recommended that the properties be retained by the Union Government, and that it establish perpetual leases, with peppercorn rent payable by local mutawallis. Following a legal dispute over ownership, initiated by the Indraprastha Vishwa Hindu Parishad, the Delhi High Court issued a stay order that remained in place until 2011. Following further government enquiries, in 2014 it was decided that the Union Government should hand the 123 properties over as waqf to the Delhi Waqf Board (DWB). The Government removed its claims under legislation. However, on 8 February 2023, the Land and Development Office issued a letter that stated:

“… the DWB has been absolved of all matters pertaining to the 123 properties listed as waqf properties… ”

— Land and Development Office, Ministry of Housing and Urban Affairs, February 2023.

As of January 2025, the dispute over ownership of the properties was ongoing.

== See also ==
- Islam in India
- Central Waqf Council
