= Sunehri Mosque, Peshawar =

Mosque in Peshawar, Khyber Pakhtunkhwa, Pakistan

Sunehri Mosque
- سنہری مسجد
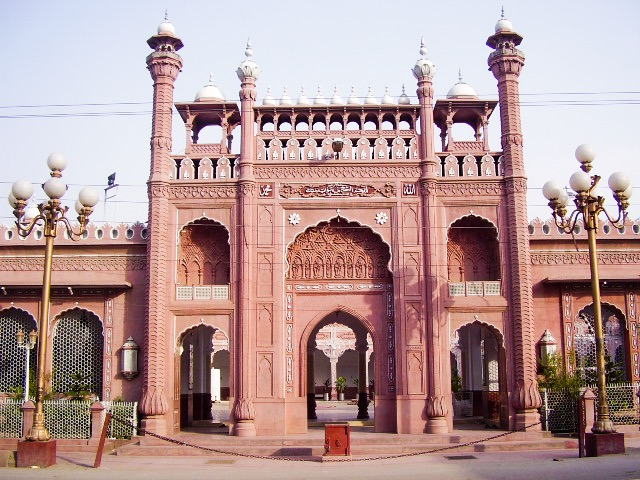

Religion
- Affiliation: Islam
- Ecclesiastical or organisational status: Mosque
- Status: Active

Location
- Location: Peshawar
- Country: Pakistan
- Interactive map of Sunehri Mosque
- Coordinates: 33°59′46″N 71°32′24″E

Architecture
- Type: Mosque architecture
- Groundbreaking: 1942
- Completed: 1992

Specifications
- Capacity: 6,000 worshippers
- Interior area: 1,700 m^{2} (18,000 sq ft)
- Dome: Several
- Minaret: Several
- Minaret height: 39 m (128 ft)

Sunehri Mosque (lit. 'Golden Mosque') is a mosque located in Peshawar, Pakistan. It is known for its considerable size and Mughal-style architecture.

== History ==
The construction of the mosque began in 1942 but experienced delays due to unavailability of funds. It was completed in 1992 and was primarily funded by public donations.

The mosque has been known for offering a separate prayer area for women. This section was established in the late 1990s but was closed for some years due to security concerns. In March 2020, the women's prayer area was reopened, allowing women to participate on Friday and Eid prayers.

== Building ==
The mosque spans 1,700 square metres (18,000 sq ft) and has a capacity for 6,000 worshippers. Its design includes red bricks, arches, domes, and pointed cupolas on the minarets, with the tallest minaret measuring 39 metres (128 ft).
