= Peter Medd =

British priest (1829–1908)

Peter Goldsmith Medd (1829 – 25 July 1908) was an English Anglican priest and scholar.

== Life ==
Medd was educated at King's College London and at University College, Oxford (although he matriculated at the University of Oxford, aged 18 on 1 March 1848, as a member of St John's College). He obtained his BA degree in 1852 and was appointed as a Fellow of University College in the same year, holding this position until 1877. He served the college as tutor, dean, librarian, and bursar. He was a long-serving member of the Council of Keble College, Oxford, having played an active part in the college's foundation. He was an ordained priest in the Church of England and was curate of St John the Baptist, Oxford (1858 to 1867), and later rector of Barnes, London (1870 to 1876), and of North Cerney, Gloucestershire (1876 onwards). He died in North Cerney after "a long and painful illness" on 25 July 1908.

His publications included a book of sermons and an edition of the manuscript of the Greek and Latin Devotions of Lancelot Andrewes. His obituary in The Times described him as "an undoubted authority" upon "all liturgical matters", whose opinion was "frequently sought" by bishops in England and the United States. His Bampton Lectures in 1882, it said, were "distinguished by great learning and an unusual wealth of illustration", although their "style and condensed character prevented them from ever becoming popular". Apart from ecclesiastical matters, he was interested in the promotion of education of women, and was a member of the council of Cheltenham Ladies' College as the representative of Oxford University. He left a widow and eight children; one of his six sons was the architect, Henry Medd.

== Publications (selected) ==
- 1861: The Priest to the Altar, or aids to the devout celebration of Holy Communion, chiefly after the ancient English use of Sarum. London: Henry Frowde; 2nd ed. 1869; 3rd ed. 1879; 4th ed. 1898; 5th ed. 1910
- 1865: Liber Precum Publicarum Ecclesiae Anglicanae; a Gulielmo Bright et Petro Goldsmith Medd latine redditus. Londini: Rivington (the Book of Common Prayer in Latin); electronic version here; 3rd ed. 1877
