= Parvez Hashmi =

Indian politician

Member of Parliament, Rajya Sabha
- In office 28 January 2009 – 27 January 2018
- Succeeded by: Sushil Kumar Gupta
- Constituency: Delhi

Personal details
- Born: 24 November 1954 (age 71) Allahabad, Uttar Pradesh, India
- Party: Indian National Congress
- Education: Aligarh Muslim University

Parvez Hashmi (born 24 November 1954) is an Indian politician born in Allahabad, Uttar Pradesh. He was a Member of Parliament, representing Delhi in the Rajya Sabha (the upper house of India's Parliament) for the second term of 2012–2018.

He belongs to the Indian National Congress. He was a member of the Delhi Legislative Assembly during 1993–98, 1998–2003, 2003-2008 and 2008–2009. He was elected to Rajya Sabha for the first term in 2009 from Delhi.

Since February 2012 he was Member of Committee on Government Assurances in the Rajya Sabha.

== Positions held ==
Year	Description
1993	Elected to 1st Delhi Assembly: Member, Committee on Assembly Rules (1994–95); Member, Public Accounts Committee (1994–1995); Member, Committee on Privileges (1995–1996); Member, Committee on Petition (1996–1999); Member, Committee on Environment (1998–1999); Member, Committee on Estimates (1995–1997)
1998	Elected to 2nd Delhi Assembly (2nd term): Cabinet Minister for Transport, Public Works Department, Land and Building, Delhi Metro; Member, Committee on Assembly Rules (2003–04); Member, Committee on Question & Reference (2003–2004)
2003	Elected to 3rd Delhi Assembly (3rd term): Member, General Purpose Committee (2004–06); Member, Committee on Library (2007–09)
2008	Elected to 4th Delhi Assembly (4th term): Member, Committee on Library (2009–10)
2009	Elected to the Rajya Sabha in a by Election
2012	Elected to the Rajya Sabha (2nd term)
