= Sacred Heart Cathedral, New Delhi =

Coordinates: 28.628699°N 77.206651°E

Sacred Heart Cathedral
- सेक्रेड हार्ट कैथेड्रल
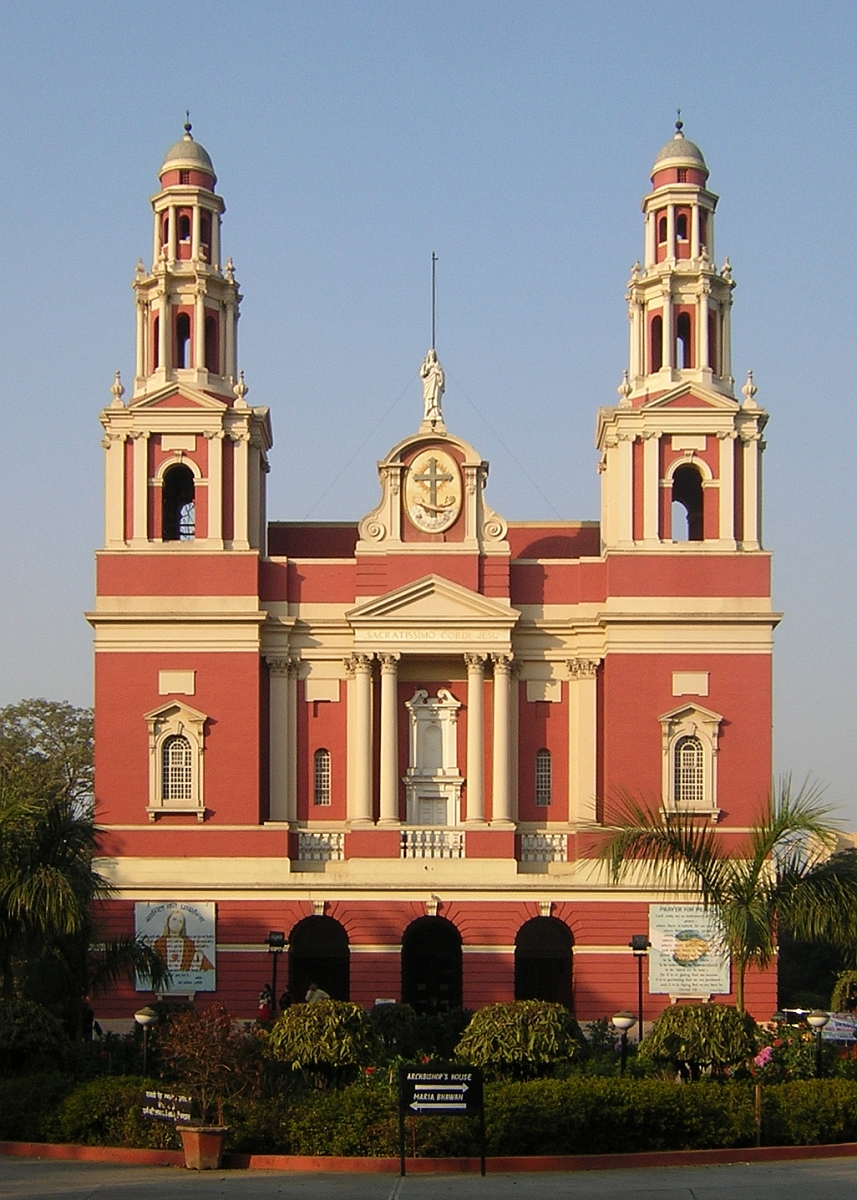
- Sacred Heart Cathedral
- Sacred Heart Cathedral
- Location: New Delhi
- Country: India
- Denomination: Catholic
- Website: sacredheartcathedraldelhi.org

History
- Status: Cathedral

Architecture
- Functional status: Active
- Architect: Henry Medd

Administration
- Diocese: Roman Catholic Archdiocese of Delhi

Clergy
- Archbishop: Anil Joseph Thomas Couto
- Priest: Fr. Francis Swaminathan.

The Cathedral of the Sacred Heart is a Catholic cathedral belonging to the Latin Rite and one of the oldest church buildings in New Delhi, India. Together with St. Columba's School, and the Convent of Jesus and Mary school, it occupies a total area of approximately 14 acres near the south end of Bhai Vir Singh Marg Road in Connaught Place.

Construction began in 1930, financed by the colonial officers of the British Empire.

== Architecture ==
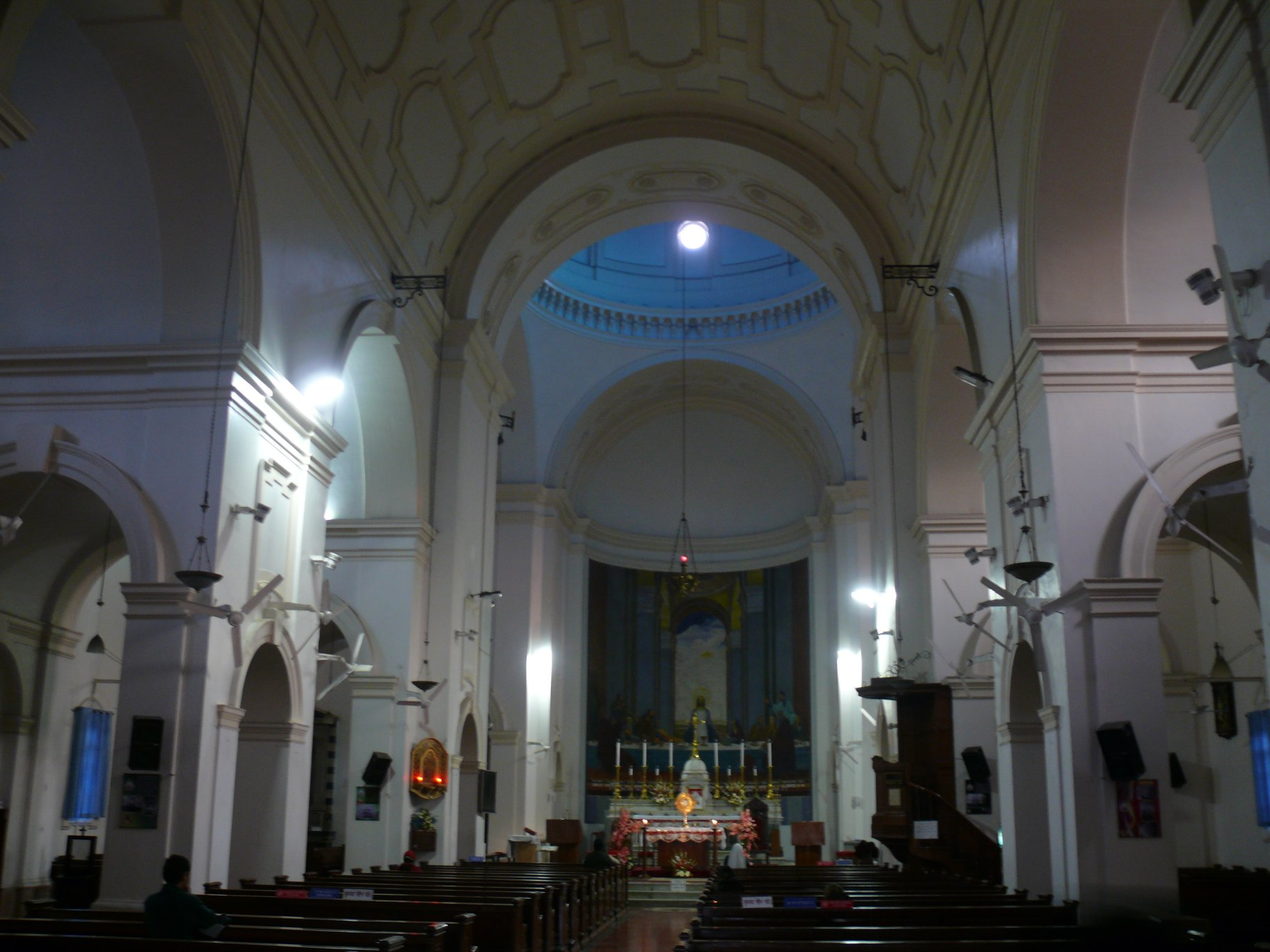
Interior towards the main altar and fresco depicting the Last Supper

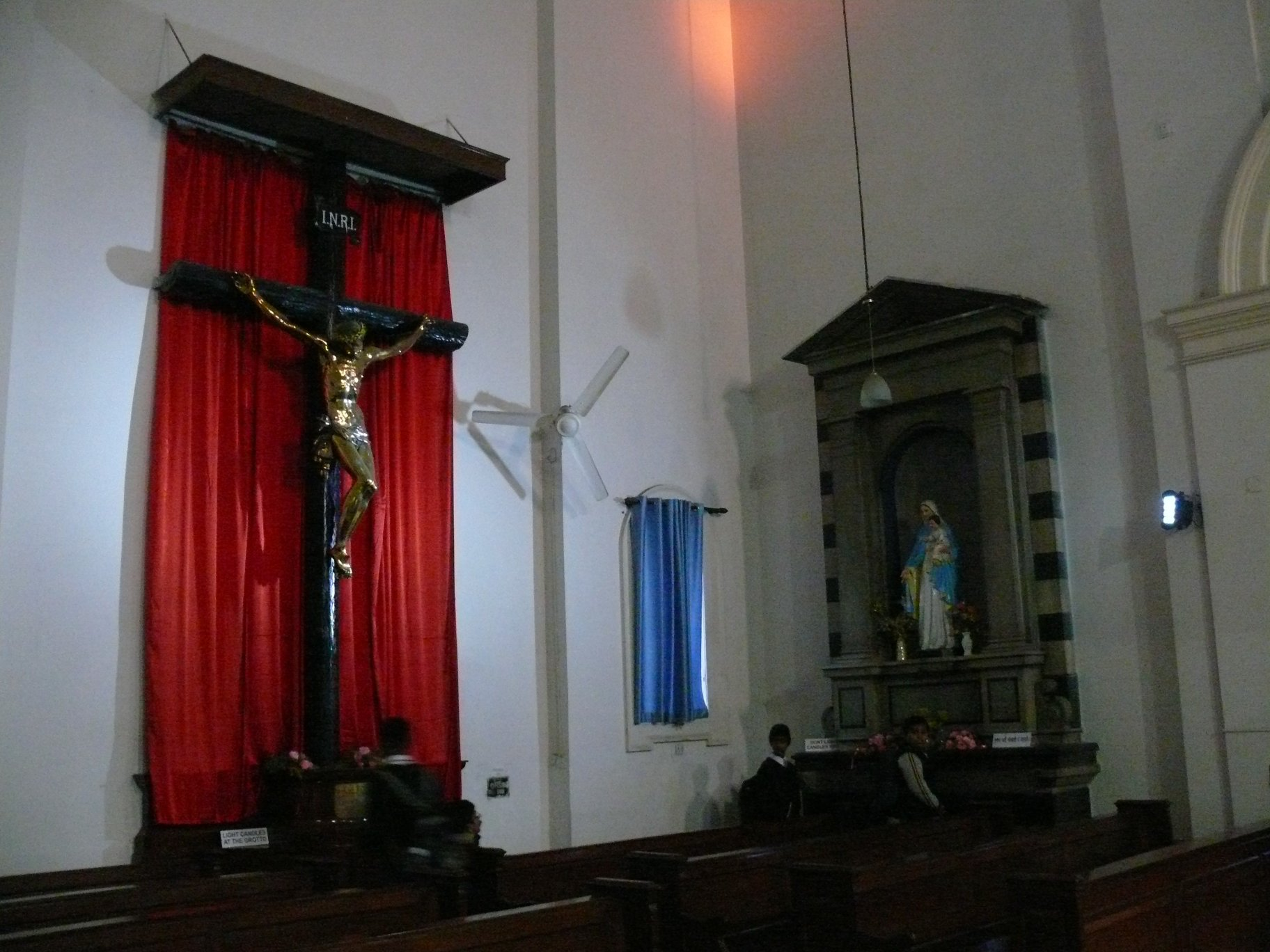
Side chapel with cross and statue of the Virgin

The church building was designed by British architect Henry Medd, and is based on Italian architecture. A facade of white pillars supports the canopy, and on each side of the cathedral's entrance porch, there are circular arcaded turrets rising above the roof. The interior has a towering curved roof, polished stone floors and broad arches.

Behind the marble altar in the apse is a large fresco depicting the Last Supper. To the left in a side chapel is a large crucifix, next to it a statue of the Virgin Mary.

== Church services and activities ==
Masses are celebrated in the Cathedral in English, Malayalam and Hindi. As of July 2026 There are four clergy allocated to the Cathedral parish.

Various cultural and social programs are also organized throughout the year.
