= Edward Clive Bayley =

Anglo-Indian civil servant, statesman and archæologist

Sir Edward Clive Bayley KCSI CIE
- Born: 17 October 1821; St. Petersburg
- Died: 30 April 1884 (aged 62)
- Education: East India Company College
- Spouse: Emily Metcalfe (m. 1850)
- Children: 8
- Parents: Edward Clive Bayley (father); Margaret Fenton (mother)
- Relatives: Georgiana Chapman (daughter)

Sir Edward Clive Bayley KCSI CIE (17 October 1821 – 30 April 1884), was an Anglo-Indian civil servant, statesman and archaeologist.

== Early life ==
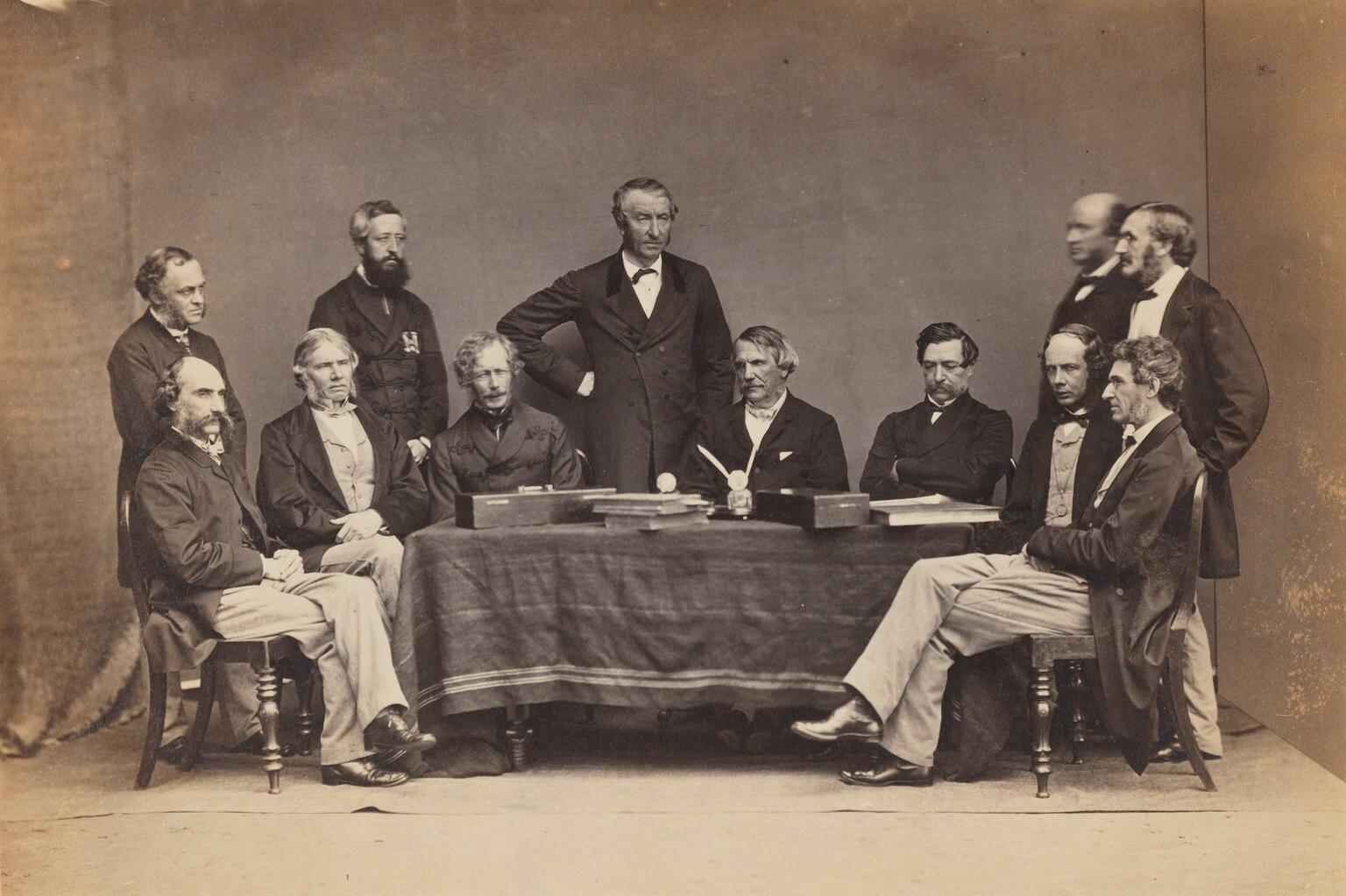
Edward Clive Bayley, standing second from right, with John Lawrence, Viceroy of India and other council members. c. 1864

Bayley was the only son of Edward Clive Bayley, of Hope Hall, Eccles, Lancashire, and Margaret Fenton. He was born at St. Petersburg in October 1821, and educated at the East India Company College.

== Career ==
Bayley entered the Indian civil service in 1842, and served at Allahabad, Meerut, Bulandshahr, and Rohtak. On the annexation of the Punjab he was appointed deputy-commissioner at Gujarat in April 1849, and in November under-secretary to the government of India in the foreign department, under Sir Henry Elliot. Two years later he became deputy-commissioner of the Kangra district, but in 1854 was compelled by poor health to take leave.

In England Bayley studied law, and he was called to the bar in 1857; he returned to India on the outbreak of the mutiny later that year. In September 1857 he was ordered to Allahabad, where he served as an under-secretary in Sir John Peter Grant's provisional government, and held various posts in that city during the next eighteen months. In 1859 he was appointed judge in the Fatehgarh Sahib district, and, after serving in a judicial capacity at Lucknow and Agra, was called to Calcutta by Lord Canning in May 1861, to fill the post of foreign secretary pending the arrival of Sir Henry Marion Durand.

In March 1862 Bayley became home secretary, an office he held for ten years, and was then selected by Lord Northbrook to fill a temporary vacancy on his council. The next year, 1873, he was appointed a member of the supreme council, on which he served until his retirement in April 1878, after 36 years of public service.

Bayley was invested as a Knight Commander of the Order of the Star of India on 1 January 1877. He married, in 1850, the writer Emily Metcalfe. His father in law was Sir Thomas Theophilus Metcalfe. They had a family of one son and seven daughters. One of his daughters, Georgiana was a writer who helped with higher education for women in London.

== Works ==
Bayley's leisure was spent in the study of the history and antiquities of India, and he published some fifteen papers in the Journal of the Bengal Asiatic Society, mainly on Indian inscriptions, sculptures, and coins, which he collected.

He also contributed to the Journal of the Royal Asiatic Society of London (1882–83) some articles on the 'Genealogy of Modern Numerals,' and to the Numismatic Chronicle (1882) a paper on 'Certain Dates on the Coins of the Hindu kings of Kabul.' At the time of his death, he had nearly completed the editing of the ninth volume of H. M. Elliot's History of India as told by its own Historians (1886). He held the post of vice-chancellor of the University of Calcutta for five years and was five times president of the Asiatic Society of Bengal.
