= Metcalfe baronets =

Extinct baronetcy in the Baronetage of the United Kingdom

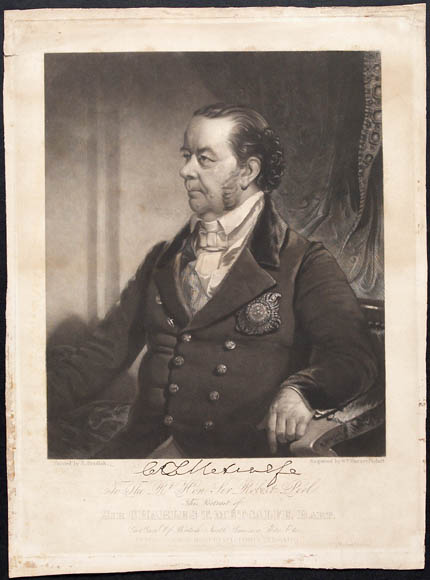
Charles Metcalfe, 1st Baron Metcalfe

The Metcalfe baronetcy, of Chilton in the County of Berkshire, was a title in the Baronetage of the United Kingdom. It was created on 21 December 1802 for Thomas Metcalfe, Member of Parliament for Abingdon between 1796 and 1807.

His second son, the third Baronet (who succeeded his elder brother), served as Acting Governor-General of India and as Governor General of the Province of Canada. In 1845 he was raised to the Peerage of the United Kingdom as Baron Metcalfe, of Fern Hill in the County of Berkshire. The barony became extinct on his death in 1846 while he was succeeded in the baronetcy by his younger brother, the fourth Baronet. He was also a colonial administrator. The title became extinct on the death of the eighth Baronet in 1979.

== Metcalfe baronets, of Chilton (1802) ==
- Sir Thomas Theophilus Metcalfe, 1st Baronet (1745–1813)
- Sir Theophilus John Metcalfe, 2nd Baronet (1783–1822)
- Sir Charles Theophilus Metcalfe, 3rd Baronet (1785–1846) (created Baron Metcalfe in 1845)

=== Barons Metcalfe (1845) ===
- Charles Theophilus Metcalfe, 1st Baron Metcalfe (1785–1846)

=== Metcalfe baronets, of Chilton (1802; reverted) ===
- Sir Thomas Theophilus Metcalfe, 4th Baronet (1795–1853)
- Sir Theophilus John Metcalfe, 5th Baronet (1828–1883)
- Sir Charles Herbert Theophilus Metcalfe, 6th Baronet (1853–1928)
- Sir Theophilus John Massie Metcalfe, 7th Baronet (1866–1950)
- Sir Theophilus John Metcalfe, 8th Baronet (1916–1979)

== Title succession chart ==
Title succession chart

Title succession chart, Metcalfe baronets.

Sir Thomas Metcalfe; 1st Baronet; 1745–1813
Baron Metcalfe
Sir Theophilus Metcalfe; 2nd Baronet; 1783–1822	Charles Metcalfe; 1st Baron Metcalfe; 3rd Baronet; 1785–1846	Sir Thomas Metcalfe; 4th Baronet; 1795–1853	Henry Metcalfe; 1796–1804
Barony extinct
Sir Theophilus Metcalfe; 5th Baronet; 1828–1883	Charles Metcalfe; 1837–1892
Sir Charles Metcalfe; 6th Baronet; 1853–1928	Sir Theophilus Metcalfe; 7th Baronet; 1866–1950	Francis Metcalfe; 1874–1929	Lt.Col. Eric Metcalfe; 1889–1934
Sir Theophilus Metcalfe; 8th Baronet; 1916–1979
Baronetcy extinct

Baronetage of the United Kingdom
Preceded by White baronets	Metcalfe baronets of Chilton; 21 December 1802	Succeeded by Eardley baronets
