= Emily Bayley =

English author

- Born: Emily Anne Theophila Metcalfe; 31 August 1830; Meerut, Bengal, British India
- Died: 6 March 1911 (aged 80); Ascot, Berkshire, England
- Known for: Memoirist
- Spouse: Sir Edward Clive Bayley (m. 1850; died 1884)
- Children: 11, including Georgiana Chapman
- Parent(s): Grace (née Clarke) and Sir Thomas Metcalfe, 4th Baronet

Emily Anne Theophila, Lady Clive Bayley (née Metcalfe; 31 August 1830 – 6 March 1911) was an English memoirist. A book of her reminiscences was published in 1980. Edited by M. M. Kaye, it was called The Golden Calm: An English Lady's Life in Moghul Delhi: Reminiscences by Emily, Lady Clive Bayley, and by Her Father Sir Thomas Metcalfe.

In 1844, her father sent her an illustrated book that he had commissioned. Known as the Delhi Book, it is currently housed in the British Museum.

== Life ==
Bayley was born in India, the daughter of Grace (born Clarke) and Sir Thomas Metcalfe, 4th Baronet, a British civil servant in India known as the British Resident (de facto Ambassador). She was educated in England before rejoining her father in Delhi at the age of seventeen.

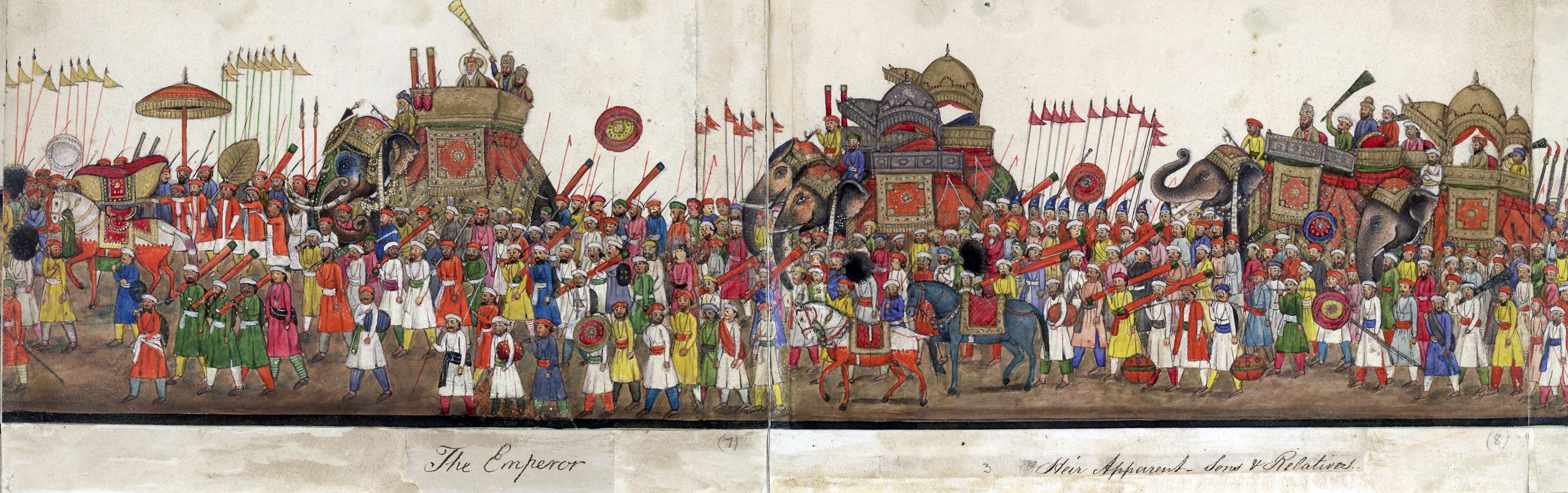
One of the illustrations from the book created by her father for her

Her father had built two houses called Metcalfe House in Delhi and he created a book for her known as the Delhi Book which he had sent to her in 1844 while she was still in England. This remained with her family after her death in 1911 until it was discovered by Lt.-Col. John Mildmay Ricketts M.C. The resulting book was built around the thoughts recorded by Emily's father and illustrated by the paintings he commissioned. This is in the British Museum. To this is added a narrative created by Emily Bayley and then these are then presented by the popular writer M. M. Kaye. in a contemporary book.

Bayley collected coins, and sold 75 Indian copper coins to the British Museum in 1889.

== Personal life ==
In 1850, Bayley married Edward Clive Bayley. He became Knight Commander of the Order of the Star of India in 1877, and Emily became "Lady Clive Bayley". They had a family of one son and seven daughters. One of their daughters, Georgiana was a writer who helped with higher education for women in London.

She died at The Wilderness, her residence at Ascot, Berkshire, aged 80.
