= General Clayton =

General Clayton may refer to:

- Gilbert Clayton (1875–1929), British Army brigadier general
- Henry DeLamar Clayton (general) (1827–1889), Confederate States Army major general
- Jasper Clayton (died 1743), British Army lieutenant general
- Powell Clayton (1833–1914), United States Volunteers brigadier general in the American Civil War
