= Governor Clayton =

Governor Clayton may refer to:

- Gilbert Clayton (1875–1929), Military Governor of Palestine from 1917 to 1917-1919
- Jasper Clayton (died 1743), Governor of Gibraltar from 1727 to 1730
- Joshua Clayton (1744–1798), 10th Governor of Delaware
- Powell Clayton (1833–1914), 9th Governor of Arkansas
