= Fernhill Park, Berkshire =

Country house in Winkfield, Berkshire, England

Coordinates: 51.4400°N 0.6608°W

Fernhill Park
- Interactive map of Fernhill Park
- Type: Private estate, country house
- Location: Cranbourne, Berkshire
- OS grid reference: SU 93181 72062

History
- Built: 18th century

Site notes
- Elevation: 307 feet (94 m)
- Area: 214 acres (87 ha)

Listed Building – Grade II
- Official name: Fernhill Park
- Designated: 7 December 1966
- Reference no.: 1390441

Listed Building – Grade II
- Official name: Buildings around Stable Court to East of Fernhill Park
- Designated: 20 December 1972
- Reference no.: 1390442

Listed Building – Grade II
- Official name: Well in Garden to South-East of Fernhill Park
- Designated: 20 December 1972
- Reference no.: 1390443

Fernhill Park is a landed private estate and country house, situated on the edge of the village of Cranbourne in the civil parish of Winkfield in the English county of Berkshire, within the former bounds of Windsor Forest, four miles from Windsor, and in close vicinity of the Windsor Great Park.

== Park ==
The estate covers 214 acres (87 ha) of primarily grazing parkland, and some woodland. There is a copse called "The Grove" which covers an area of 11 acres (4.5 ha). Other features of the property include a large man-made lake, a large walled kitchen garden (4000 square yards), and two farms Fernhill Farm and Forest Farm. These have been in existence since at least 1817. The terrain is a gradual slope from NE to SW, with the highest point of 307 feet (94 m) at the top end of mounts hill road (Forest farm entrance), to the lowest point of 217 feet (66 m) where Lovel and Hatchet lanes meet. Fernhill (the house) commands great views on top of its peak of 295 feet (90 m).

== Country house ==
At the centre of the property is Fern Hill on which a large Grade II early 18th century mansion stands. This great mansion was visible from Lovel Lane, one of the four roads which serve as the boundary of the property.

== History ==
It is said that the large house was built by John Thorp in 1700, but little is documented of this.

The property was then in the possession of Thomas Hancock. Hancock is gazetted and inferred as being the registrar for entrants to "Her Majesty’s Plate of 100 guineas" which was to be held at Ascot on 7 August 1711. This incidentally was the beginning of horse racing at Ascot.

The next proprietor of Fern Hill was Lieutenant General Jasper Clayton (1675-1743), who died at the Battle of Dettingen. (Note: A couple of sources claim that Clayton was buried at the Parish church in Winkfield, Buckinghamshire but this is not substantiated.) Jasper's wife predeceased him and so the property fell to his eldest son Jasper Clayton albeit with the recommendation that he sell the property.

The property then came into possession of a scion of the ancient Knollys family. Sir Francis Knollys, 1st Baronet (1722–1772) was resident at "Fearnhill" in 1772. He died childless, and the property passed in 1791 on the death of the wife Dame Mary Knollys to his kinsman Francis Weldale who took the surname Knollys.

The estate is mentioned in the will of Francis Knollys (Weldale) penned on 6 December 1805 who bequeathed the property to his wife Ann Knollys, noting the impeding sale of it to Sir Thomas Metcalfe, 1st Baronet. Knollys had sought the sum of £13,111 11s 11d for the sale of the estate equivalent to £42.8 million (economic share) in 2002.

Metcalfe secured the property by auction in November 1805. (Note: Metcalfe was made Baronet Metcalfe of Chilton. Metcalf had purchased Chilton Hungerford from Robert Peeres, but had already conveyed that property to Benjamin Morland of Abingdon in 1803.) Fernhill remained in possession of this esteemed family for several generations. In 1854 Sir Thomas Metcalfe, 4th Baronet bequeathed the family estate to his eldest son Theophilus John Metcalfe on condition that the property descends with the Baronetcy so long as "legal male issue exists".

== Forest Farm ==
Forest Farm was once an independent property. The original house was built in 1793, and it was described as a villa of brick stucco, and had the peculiarity of having "the whole extent of the entrance front formed into a green house". Mary Squire (Note: Mary was the daughter of Edmund Squire of Widdington Hall, Essex and his wife Mary Squire née Cater. This is significant as Mary senior was the cousin of Dame Mary Knollys of Fernhill and both were provided legacies in Knollys will of 1791.) is recorded as the holding the land in 1798 and resided there until her death in 1816. Henry Pelham-Clinton 7th Duke of Newcastle and his wife Katherine were the last owners, and held the possession of it until 1955. The house sometimes referred to Forest Hill was demolished as surplus to requirement on the behest of the honourable Irene Waite née Austin who owned Fernhill.
