= Sir Thomas Metcalfe, 1st Baronet =

British politician

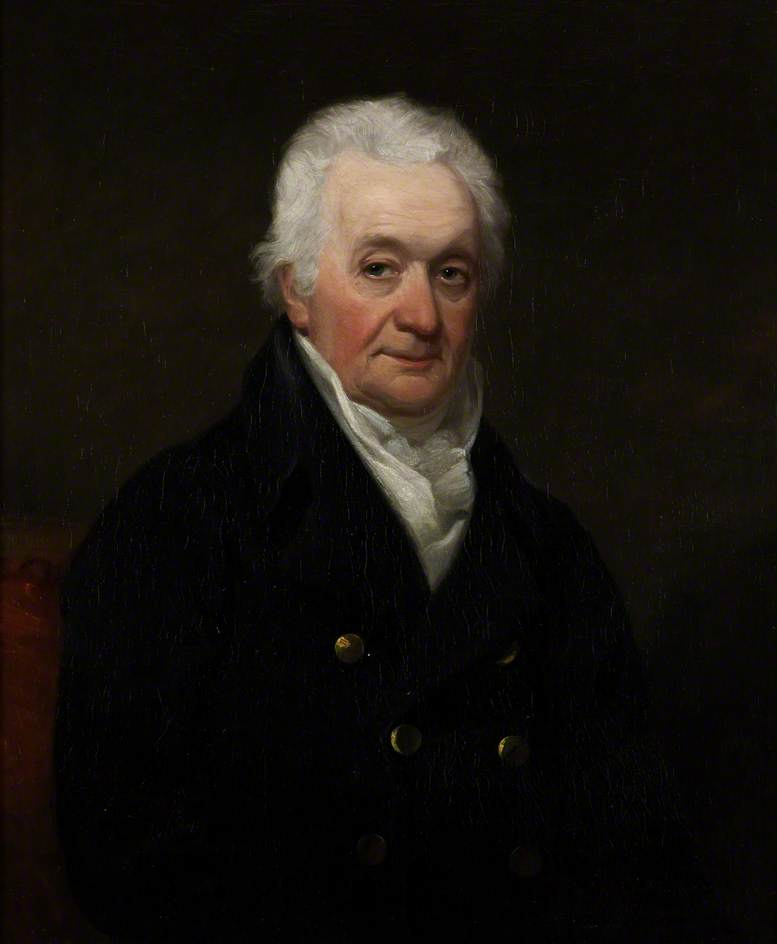
Image of Sir Thomas Theophilus Metcalfe

Sir Thomas Theophilus Metcalfe, 1st Baronet (8 January 1745 – 17 November 1813), was a British soldier and politician.

== Biography ==
Metcalfe was the son of Rev'd Thomas Metcalfe, a chaplain in the British Army, and his wife, Margaret Williams.

Metcalfe was born at Throstle Nest, Gisborough, Cleveland, England. He served as an officer in the army of the East India Company having first traveled to India in 1767, eventually becoming a major in the Bengal Army. He was a Director of the East India Company intermittently between 1789 and 1812, and gained a considerable personal fortune. He purchased the manor of Chilton and the estate of Fernhill at Winkfield in Berkshire,

He was elected Member of Parliament for Abingdon in 1796 as a Tory. He sat for the seat until his defeat at the 1807 general election. Most of his contributions in the Commons related to India and its administration. On 21 December 1802, he was created a baronet, of Chilton in the County of Berkshire, in the Baronetage of the United Kingdom. He was High Sheriff of Berkshire in 1809.

== Personal life ==
Metcalfe married Susannah Selina Sophia Debonnaire on 18 April 1782, and together they had eight children:

- Sir Theophilus John Metcalfe, 2nd Baronet (1783–1822)
- Charles Theophilus Metcalfe, 1st Baron Metcalfe (1785–1846)
- Louisa Sophia Metcalfe (1787–?)
- Selina Sophia Metcalfe (1788–1791)
- Emily Theophila Metcalfe (1790–1885)
- Georgiana Theophila Metcalfe (died b. 1864)
- Sir Thomas Theophilus Metcalfe, 4th Baronet (1795–1853)
- Henry Theophilus Metcalfe (1796–1804)

Parliament of Great Britain
Preceded by Edward Loveden Loveden	Member of Parliament for Abingdon; 1796–1800	Succeeded by Parliament of the United Kingdom
Parliament of the United Kingdom
Preceded by Parliament of Great Britain	Member of Parliament for Abingdon; 1801–1807	Succeeded by George Knapp
Political offices
Preceded by William Congreve	High Sheriff of Berkshire; 1809	Succeeded by Peter Green
Baronetage of the United Kingdom
New creation	Baronet of Chilton; 1802–1813	Succeeded by Sir Theophilus Metcalfe
