= James Metcalfe (Bengal Army officer) =

Lieutenant-Colonel James Metcalfe CB (1817 – 8 March 1888) was an Anglo-Indian military officer in the Bengal Army.

== Biography ==
Metcalfe was born in India, an illegitimate son of Charles Metcalfe and a Punjabi Sikh mother whom his father had met whilst envoy to the court of Ranjit Singh at Lahore He had three full brothers.

He was educated at the East India Company Military Seminary at Addiscombe in Surrey. He returned to India in 1836 as a commissioned second lieutenant in the Bengal Native Infantry part of the Bengal Army. He became adjutant of his regiment in 1839 until 1846. On the death of his father in 1846 he inherited a fortune of £50,000.

Between 1848 and 1853 he served as aide-de-camp to The Marquess of Dalhousie during his term as Governor-General of India. During the Indian Rebellion of 1857 he was appointed interpreter to the Commander-in-Chief in India General Sir Colin Campbell as well as aide-de-camp and commandant to the headquarters. After the rebellion he was made a Companion of the Order of Bath and promoted to lieutenant-colonel. He retired from service in 1861. He later migrated to London, where he died on 8 March 1888.

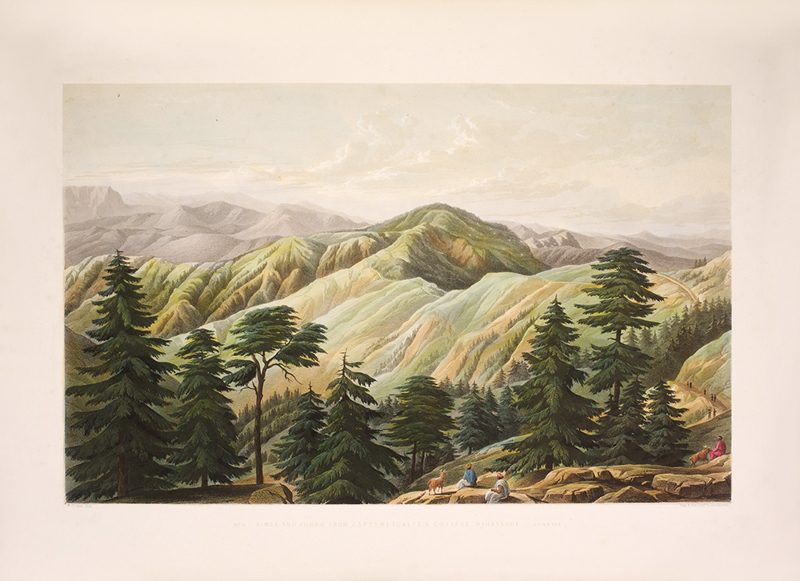
Simla and Jukko from Capt. Metcalfe's Cottage, Mahassoue.

== Personal life ==
In 1852 he married José Eliza, daughter of Evelyn Meadows Gordon of the Bengal civil service.
