= Defence Scientific Information and Documentation Centre =

Indian defense institute

Defence Scientific Information & Documentation Centre
- Established: 29 July 1970
- Director: K Nageswara Rao
- Location: Metcalfe House, Delhi-110054, Delhi
- Operating agency: DRDO
- Website: DESIDOC Home Page

The Defence Scientific Information & Documentation Centre (DESIDOC) is a division of the Defence Research and Development Organisation (DRDO). Located in Delhi, its main function is the collection, processing and dissemination of relevant technical information for DRDO scientists. The present director of DESIDOC is K Nageswara Rao.

== History ==
DESIDOC started functioning in 1958 as Scientific Information Bureau (SIB). It was a division of the Defence Science Laboratory (DSL) which is now called Laser Science & Technology Centre. The DRDO library which had its beginning in 1948 became a division of SIB in 1959. In 1967 SIB was reorganised with augmented activities and named Defence Scientific Information and Documentation Centre (DESIDOC). It still continued to function under the administrative control of DSL. DESIDOC became a self-accounting unit and one of the laboratories of DRDO on 29 July 1970.

The centre was functioning in the main building of Metcalfe House, a landmark in Delhi and a national monument. In August 1988 it moved to its newly built five-storeyed building in the same Metcalfe House complex. Since it became a self-accounting unit, DESIDOC has been functioning as a central information resource for DRDO. It provides S&T information, based on its library and other information resources, to the DRDO headquarters, and its various laboratories at various places in India.

== Functions ==
=== Library ===
DESIDOC maintains the Defence Science Library (DSL), which is a well-equipped library housing 262,000 documents. It also provides access to various databases, and other reference material. Additionally, DESIDOC has taken up the initiative of digitizing complete research papers of DRDO scientists, as well as preparing presentation material and promotional material for DRDO scientists.

=== Publications ===
DESIDOC functions as the publication wing of DRDO, providing scientific and technical information via specialised publications, monographs, technical bulletins, online journals and popular science publications. These cover current developments in Indian defence R&D. The publications are unclassified and available free of charge online. Monographs and other publications are available on payment. The periodicals published are:

- Defence Science Journal - bi-monthly research periodical.
- Technology Focus - bi-monthly periodical focusing on the technologies, products, processes, and systems developed by DRDO.
- DRDO Newsletter - monthly newsletter with house bulletins of DRDO activities.
- DESIDOC Journal of Library & Information Technology (earlier DESIDOC Bulletin of Information Technology (DBIT)) - bi-monthly publication bringing out the current developments in library and information technology.

=== Training programs ===
Short term training programmes and workshops are conducted every year for DRDO personnel, mainly in the areas of library automation, Internet use, DTP, multimedia development, communication skills, stress management, etc. CEPs
