= Georgiana Chapman =

English writer (1855–1941)

Lady Georgiana Charlotte Clive Chapman
- Born: 11 May 1855; London, England
- Died: 4 April 1941 (aged 85)
- Occupation: Writer
- Spouse: Edward Francis Chapman (m. 1886; died 1926)
- Parents: Edward Clive Bayley (father); Emily Metcalfe (mother)

Georgiana Charlotte Clive Chapman, Lady Chapman, (née Bayley; 11 May 1855 – 4 April 1941) was an English biographer and educator. She was a council member and college administrator for Westfield College in Hampstead from 1890 to her death in 1941.

== Early life ==
Georgiana Charlotte Clive Bayley was born in London on 11 May 1855, the daughter of Edward Clive Bayley and the writer Emily Anne Theophila Bayley. Her father held a position in the English Civil Service in India, and Georgiana spent her early years in Bengal.

By 1884, Bayley was living with her widowed mother in Ascot when she took up a part-time post as secretary to the council of Westfield College in Hampstead. She was responsible for a range of administrative duties and helped the college's Principal, Constance Maynard, with the accounts.

== Marriage and time in India ==
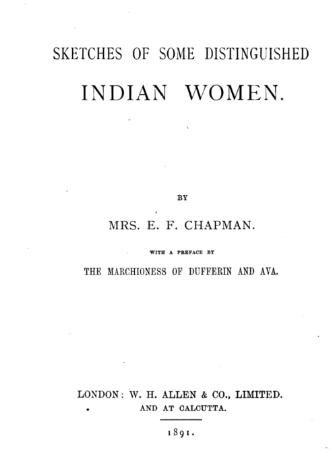
Sketches of some Distinguished India Women, 1891

In 1886, Bayley left the college after her marriage to Edward Francis Chapman. They moved to India, where he took up post as quartermaster-general, until 1889 when they returned to England. Whilst in India she gathered the material for her book, Sketches of some Distinguished India Women, which was published in 1891. The books introduction precedes profiles of the social reformer Pandita Ramabai, physician Dr. Anandi Gopal Joshi, The Marahani of Kuch Behar, the poet Toru Dutt and the lawyer Cornelia Sorabji.

== Involvement with Westfield College ==
On their return to England, Lady Chapman took up a post as a member of the Westfield College council which she held for the rest of her life. She shared the college's aims of both preparing women for London University degrees and Christian service. The college required all council members to belong to the evangelical wing of the Church of England. She focussed heavily on her work with the college, serving on committees and drawing up the annual report.

In 1909, Lady Chapman was offered the role of vice-chair when it was created. As vice-chair she frequently deputised for the men who held the office of chair. From 1917, Chapman was also the chair of the finance committee of the college. She and her husband both donated from their own collections to the college library. A new library, completed in 1927, was named after her.

Between 1900 and 1920, and again from 1931 to 1933, Lady Chapman was President of the Westfield College Association: a membership group for former students.

She officially gave up her roles with the college in 1937, but remained on its council.

== Other activities ==
From 1901, when her husband retired, the Chapmans lived in Limpsfield. She co-founded a branch of the Women's Citizens' Association and was co-opted onto the education committee of Surrey County Council. She was critical of the state educational offer as she felt it was biased towards the needs of men and boys.

She became Lady Chapman when her husband was knighted in 1906. After her husband's death, Chapman moved to Hampstead to be near Westfield College.

== Death ==
Chapman died on 4 April 1941 in Hampstead, and her funeral was held in the college chapel.
