= Metcalfe House =

- Dilkhusha
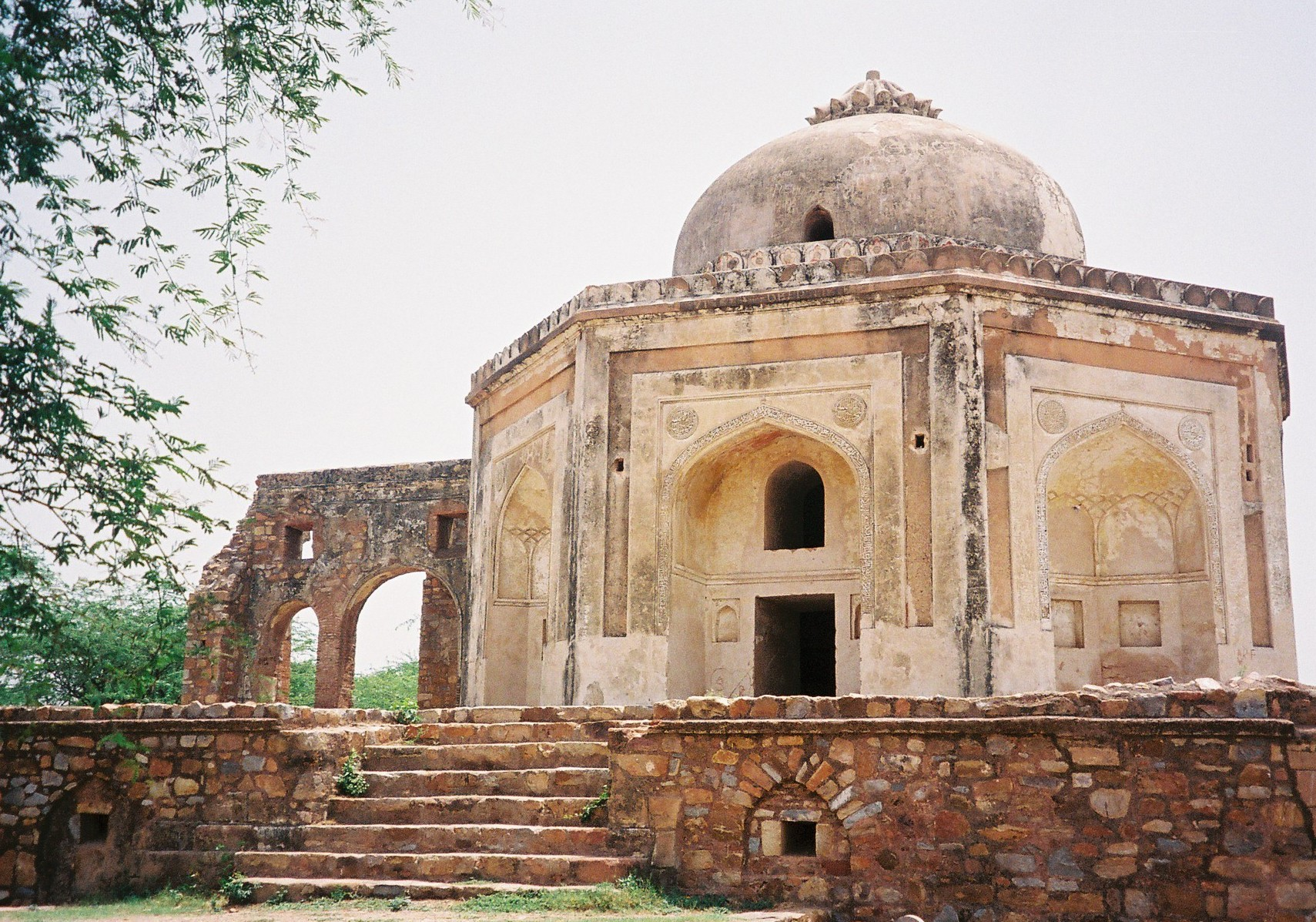
- Dilkhusha or Metcalfe House in Qutb Archaeological Village, in ruins as on date

- Location within Delhi
- Former names: Quli Khan Tomb

General information
- Type: Mansion
- Architectural style: Mughal and European
- Location: Qutb Complex (Mehrauli Archaeological Park)
- Coordinates: 28°31′21″N 77°11′13″E
- Current tenants: Archaeological Survey of India
- Destroyed: 1857
- Client: Sir Thomas Metcalfe
- Landlord: Government of India

Technical details
- Structural system: stones and brick

Design and construction
- Architect: Sir Thomas Metcalfe

Metcalfe House is the name given to two residential houses built in the 19th century in Delhi; one is near Old Delhi Civil Lines and the other is in Mehrauli, South Delhi. These were built by Sir Thomas Metcalfe (1795–1853), a civil servant, when he was the Governor General's last British resident (agent) at the Mughal court of Emperor Bahadur Shah Zafar.

The first house near the Civil Lines, called the 'town house', was built in 1835 in colonial style, near the present day Inter State Bus Terminal (ISBT). He resided there till his death in 1853. It was badly damaged during the Indian Rebellion of 1857 (well known as the Uprising). It was repaired subsequently. His son Sir Theophilus Metcalfe (who had a major involvement in the British suppression of the uprising) inherited it. The house exchanged hands several times before it finally came under the possession of the Government of India. Between 1920 and 1926, it also remained the seat of the Council of State of the Imperial Legislative Council, which eventually paved way for the present Rajya Sabha, till the inauguration of the Parliament House in New Delhi. It now houses the highly secured offices and residences of the Defence Scientific Information & Documentation Centre (DESIDOC) and Defence Terrain Research Laboratory (DTRL), and many other divisions of the Defence Research & Development Organisation (DRDO). It is out of limits for visitors and photography.

The second Metcalfe House, known as 'the retreat' or 'Dilkhusha', was also built by Sir Thomas Theophilus Metcalfe as a country house in Mehrauli in South Delhi in Qutb Complex. 'Dilkhusha' in Urdu language means "Delight of the Heart". He refurbished the 16th century Mughal tomb of Quli Khan in true English style as a pleasure retreat by surrounding it with many rest houses, follies and gardens. He used to lease out his retreat as a guest house to honeymooning couples, as it provided an idyllic view of the Qutub Minar with its surrounding structures. An inscription at site (photo of plaque in the gallery) testifies that Metcalfe rented out this house to honeymooning couples.

== The town house ==
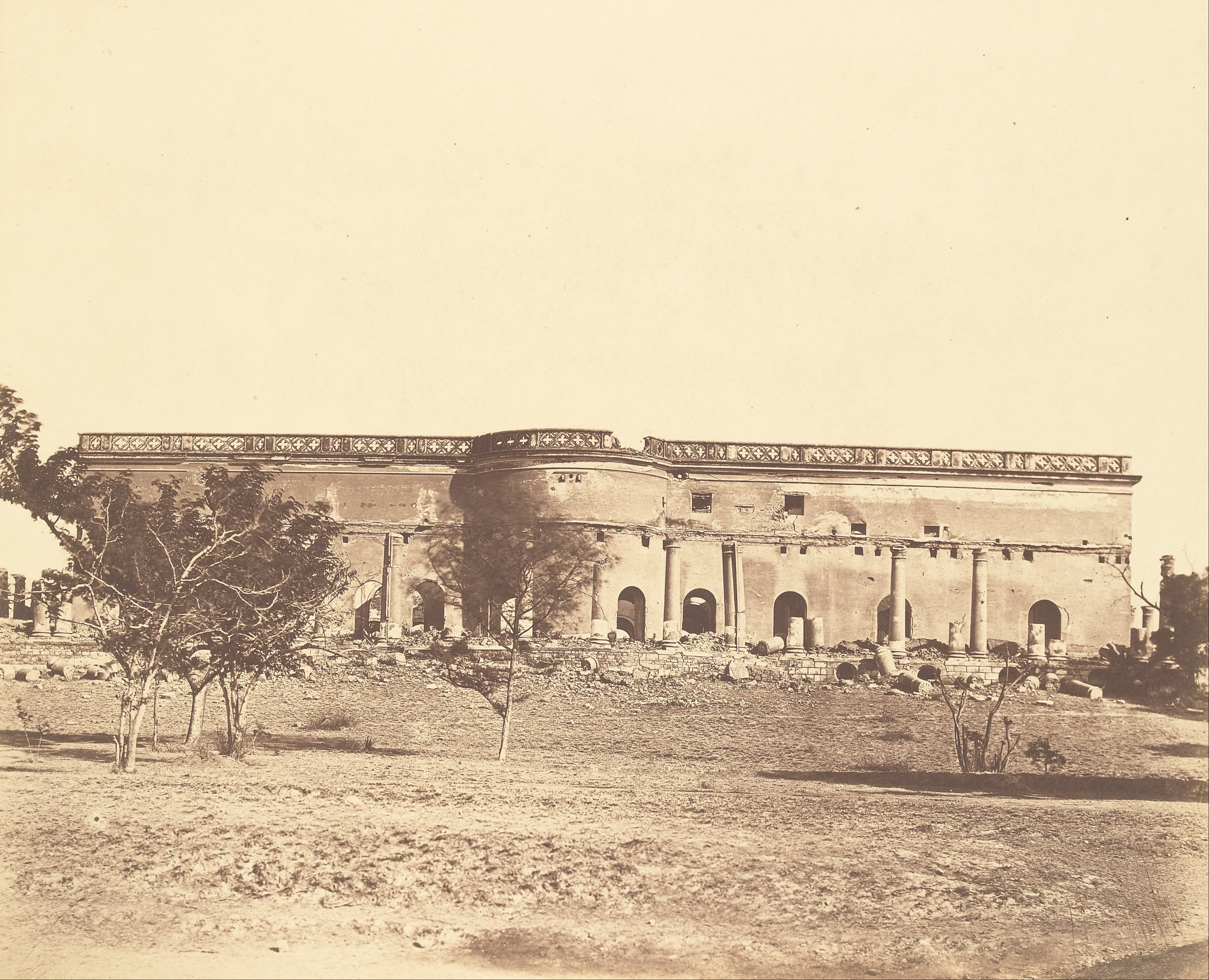
The Metcalfe Town House in 1858, by Felice Beato

Metcalfe built his town house, close to the Yamuna River on its right bank, on the old Metcalfe road, now rechristened as Mahatma Gandhi Road, in the heart of the Old Delhi. It was also known as 'Jahan Numa' meaning "World Showing". The workers who built this mansion and attendants at Metcalfe's house called it "Matka Kothi", ('Metcalfe' pronounced as "Matka" and 'Kothi' means "House" in Hindi language) a corrupted version; for them the name 'Metcalfe House' was a tongue twister. Built as a huge palatial house in European style (colonial style), it had Indian adaptations of high ceiling and small windows and doors to suit local climatic conditions. It was built as a counter to the Mughal Emperor's Red Fort Palace close by. It was built as a double storied mansion with a large but an impressive façade (that is stated to have been substantially changed in 1913). It had creative underground passageways, one of which was used as a billiards room (pictured). The mansion was surrounded by well manicured garden of cypress tree lined pathways, flowerbeds, orange groves, roads and a swimming pool. The doors of the regal building were festooned with mistletoe and holly.

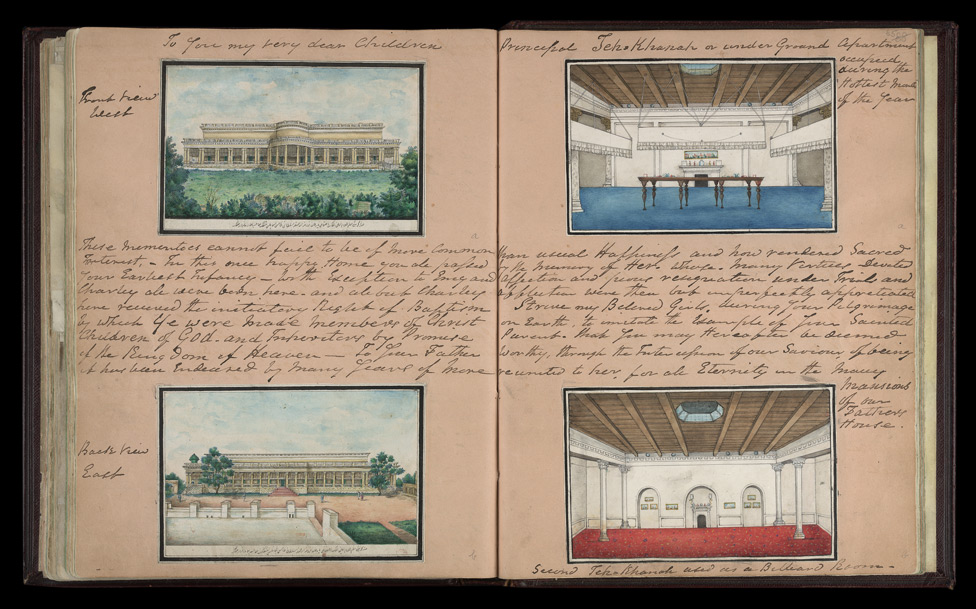
Different views of Metcalfe's palatial town house. Pictures from the album Reminiscences of Imperial Delhi compiled and presented by Metcalfe to his daughter Emily

The wide verandah, encircling the main building on all sides, was supported on impressive stone columns. Inventive underground rooms called the tykhanas were used for cool comforts during the summer season and for playing billiards. A library with 25,000 books and a Napoleon gallery with relics of Napoleon were part of the displays in the large building, apart from beautiful oil paintings and rosewood Georgian furniture. However, during the Uprising of 1857, there was extensive damage to the buildings, all the documents and displays. It is said that Metcalfe had bought the land for building his town house from Gujjars and the same Gujjars ransacked and damaged it during the Upraising in 1857. Theophilus Metcalfe, son of Sir Thomas Metcalfe (died 1853), named as the "One-eyed Metcalfe" due to his monocle, was the city magistrate during the Uprising. He was accused of vengeful destruction of the city and reprisals against its residents, particularly Muslims. During the days of its glory, the town house was famous for the high society social gatherings held in its premises. Extravagant Christmas and New Year parties were held here. An album titled 'Reminiscences of Imperial Delhi', which had 89 folios with about 130 paintings (a few pictured here) of the Mughal and pre-Mughal period monuments, was compiled by Metacalfe with a transcript written by him to his daughter Emily. In this transcript, he poignantly describes the house and the happy incidents that occurred there. It is better quoted in his own words than paraphrased (the photos also show the manuscript).

In this once happy home you all passed your earliest infancy. With exception to Emy and Charley all were born here- and all but Charley have received the initiatory right [sic] of baptism by which Ye were made member of Christ Children of God and inheritors by promise of the Kingdom of Heaven. To your father it has been endeared by many years of more…

An unusual tale recounted is of a lavish Christmas Eve party in 1895 held at this house in which a mysterious Englishman was murdered in the antechamber and simultaneously a fire also broke out that destroyed Metcalfe's Testimonials. The murder and reasons for the fire are shrouded in mystery. The house was rebuilt in 1913 with Gothic arches but can now be glimpsed from outside only, since it is occupied by the Defense establishment of the DRDO.

The building is now the headquarters of the Defence Scientific Information & Documentation Centre (DESIDOC) in Delhi.

== The Retreat or Dilkhusha ==
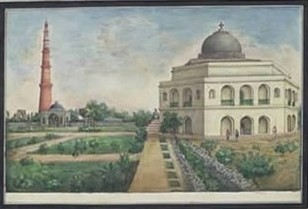
Dilkhusha, the Metcalfe summer House in Qutb Complex built by Metcalfe as a retreat -A Painting from his Folio published in 1843

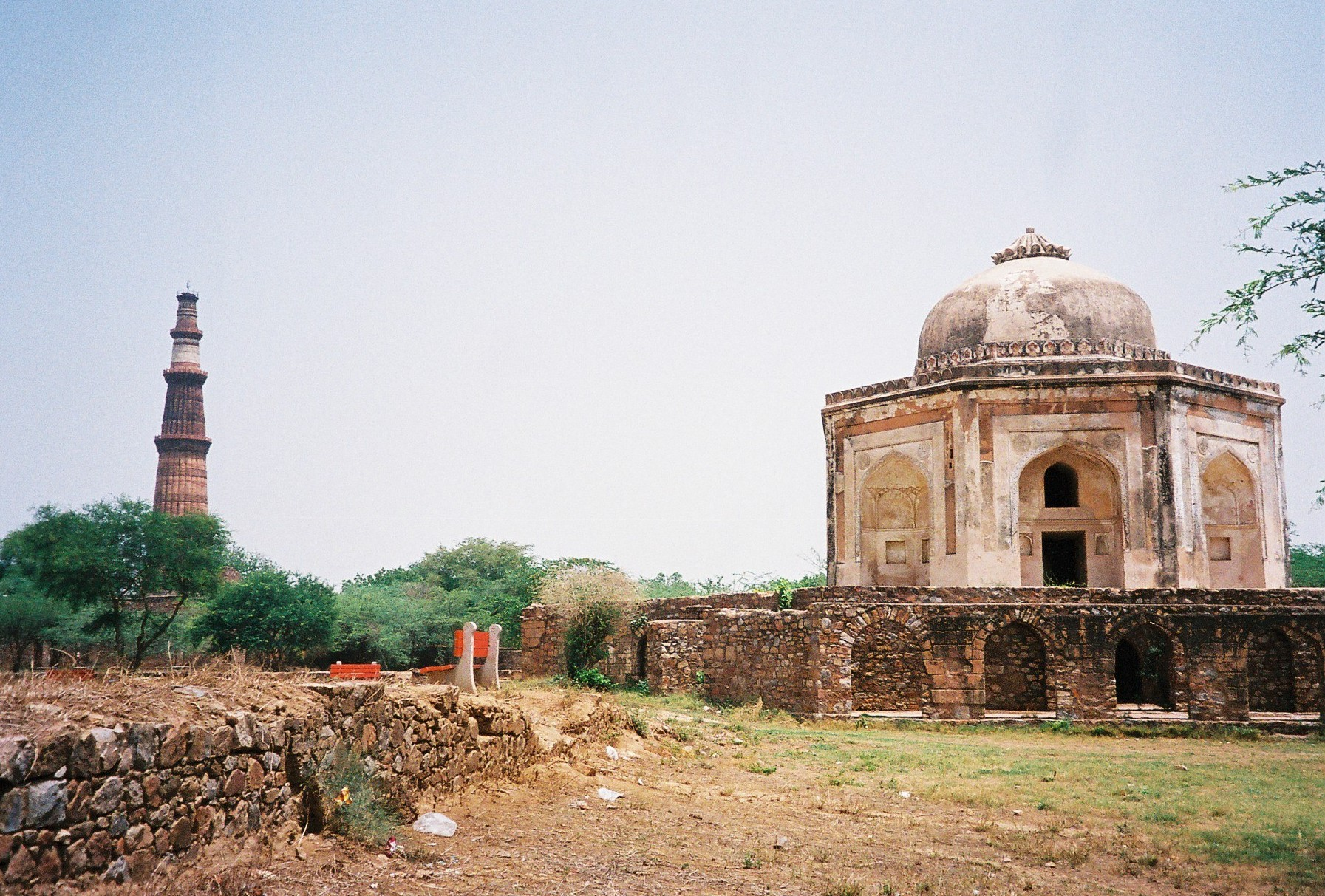
Metcalfe's summer retreat 'Dilkhusha', almost completely reduced to the tomb at its core in 2009 with Qutub Minar in the picture

The second house in Mehrauli was initially a tomb of Muhammad Quli Khan, brother of Adham Khan, a general and foster brother of Emperor Akbar. The octagonal Mughal tomb built in the 17th century was bought by Metcalfe and remodeled in the style of European residences with extensive gardens and follies for use as a pleasure resort during the monsoon season. He called it the 'Dilkhusha' (also see under External link of the album showing two pictures of Dilkusha as it existed when built). It was spread over a sprawling area, which is now enclosed in a specially developed park called the 'Qutub Archaeological Village'. The purpose in building this place was stated to be that Metcalfe wanted to keep a watch on Emperor Bahadur Shah II who also had his Zafar Mahal palace in Mehrauli to spend his summer time.

The complex was a pleasant place with several controlled streamlets of water, which led to a tank (now called the Metcalfe's Boathouse and Dovecote). The tank was dated to the Lodi Dynasty period. This was refurbished by Metcalfe for use, for boating and swimming. Steps built from the boathouse lead to his Dilkhusha. With a retinue of servants, the immaculately kept place was stated to be an ideal setting for honeymooning couples. He also built, in "pseudo Mughal" style, a Chhatri (kiosk) or a folly with a dome and arches, and few other follies known as Garhganjs (in the form of a spiral and square stepped ziggurats).

All of the above can be seen in the Archaeological Park (a special enclosure created recently), which has strategically placed signages showing directions to the various heritage monuments. This village was created by the Indian National Trust for Art and Cultural Heritage (INTACH), south of the Qutub Minar(see External Link on page 6 for the Map of the Archaeological Village).

The retreat had been built like a citadel, the tomb of Quli Khan at its core, along with the folly (also called the only landlocked light house) in the Indo–Persian baradari style. The folly was built opposite to the house, surrounded by a sprawling garden. The central hall of the tomb was converted into a dining hall. Two wings were added as annexes, out of which ruins of only one is seen now. He also converted some of the old buildings around the tomb into guesthouse, staff quarters and stables. It is also recorded that Metcalfe, the fastidious person that he was, spent lot of time at this place during his 40 years of life in Delhi. He loved this retreat and had a set of rooms made for use as a study and also lodgings for his daughter Emily to stay with him, while his wife and son lived in the formal town house in the old city. Thomas's fondness for this place is reflected in his own words:

The ruins of grandeur that extend for miles on every side fill it with serious reflection," he wrote. "The palaces crumbling into dust... the myriads of vast mausoleums, every one of which was intended to convey to futurity the deathless fame of its cold inhabitant, and all of which are now passed by, unknown and unnoticed. These things cannot be looked at with indifference.

== Gallery ==
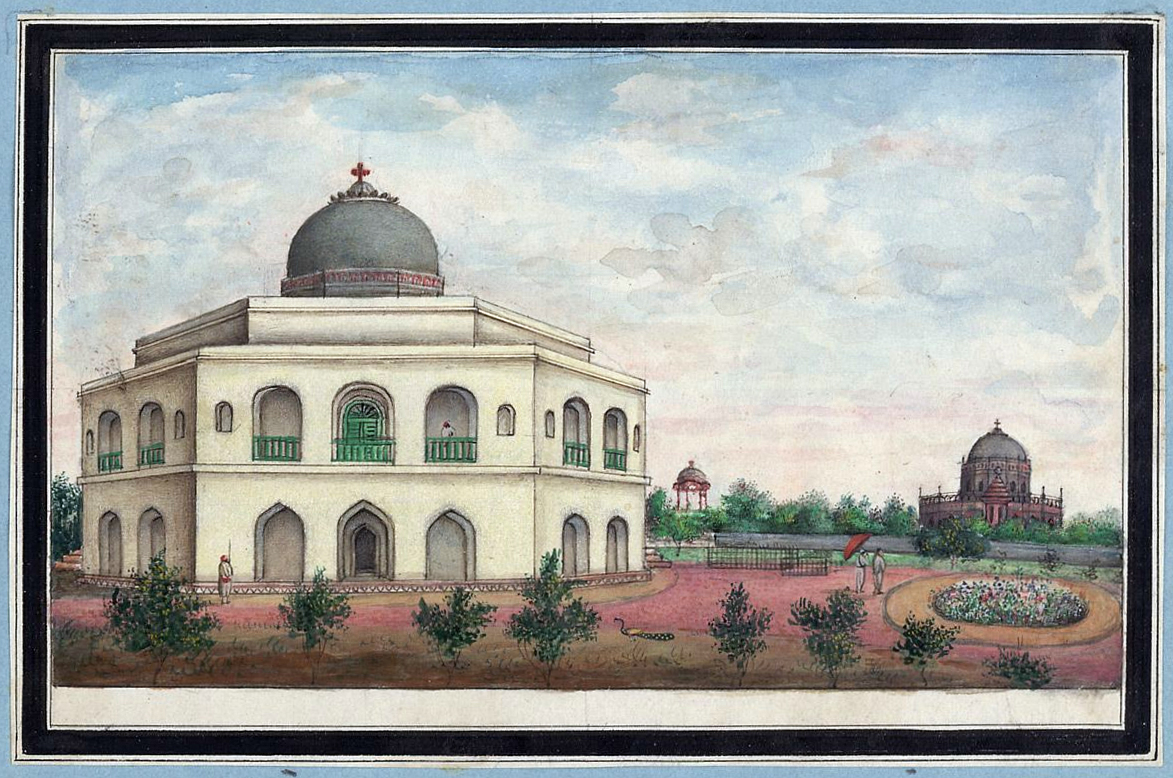
Dilkhusa with the tomb of Adham Khan, in the distance, 1843

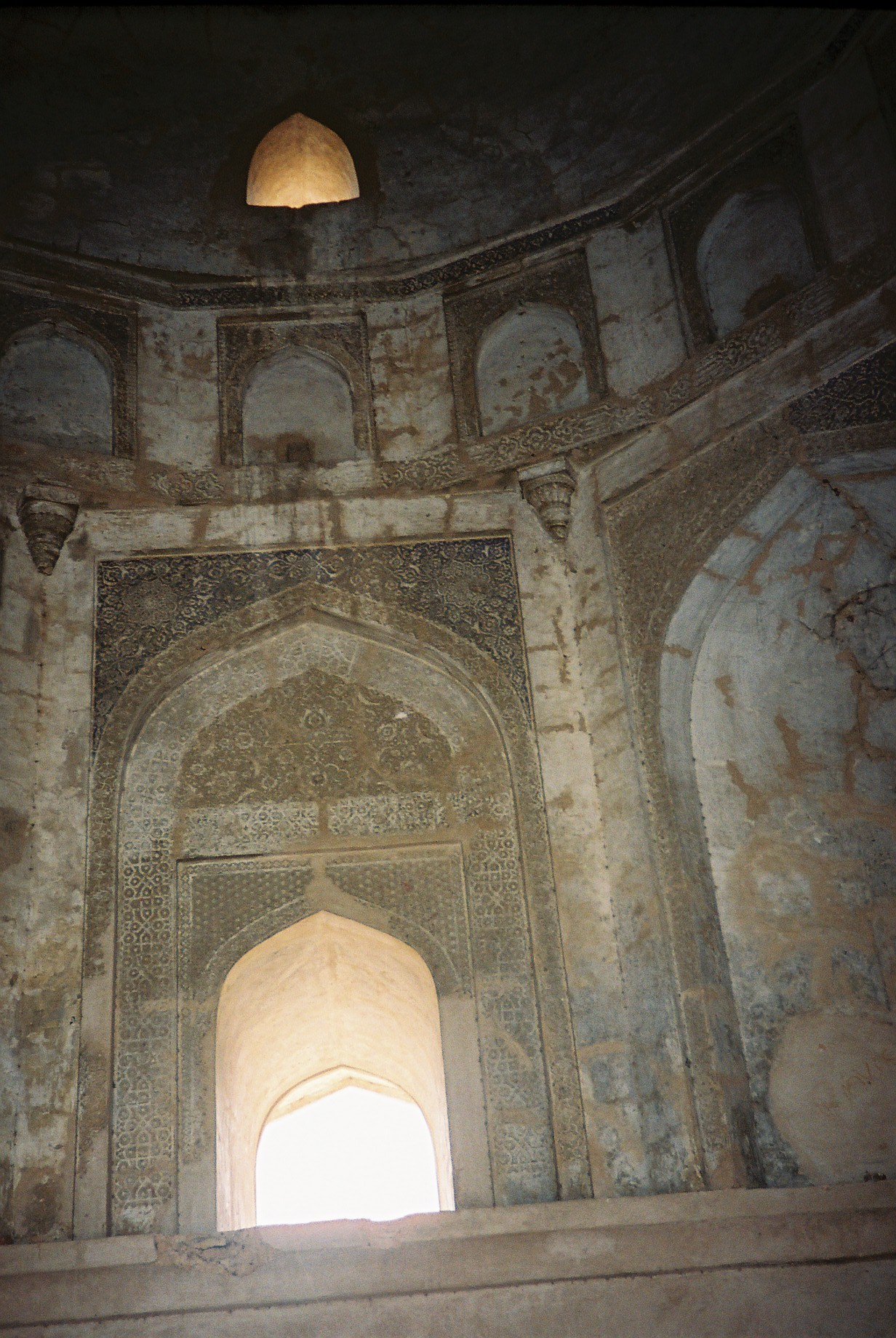
Inside view on walls and roof of the central hall of the Dilkhusha in the former Quli Khan tomb

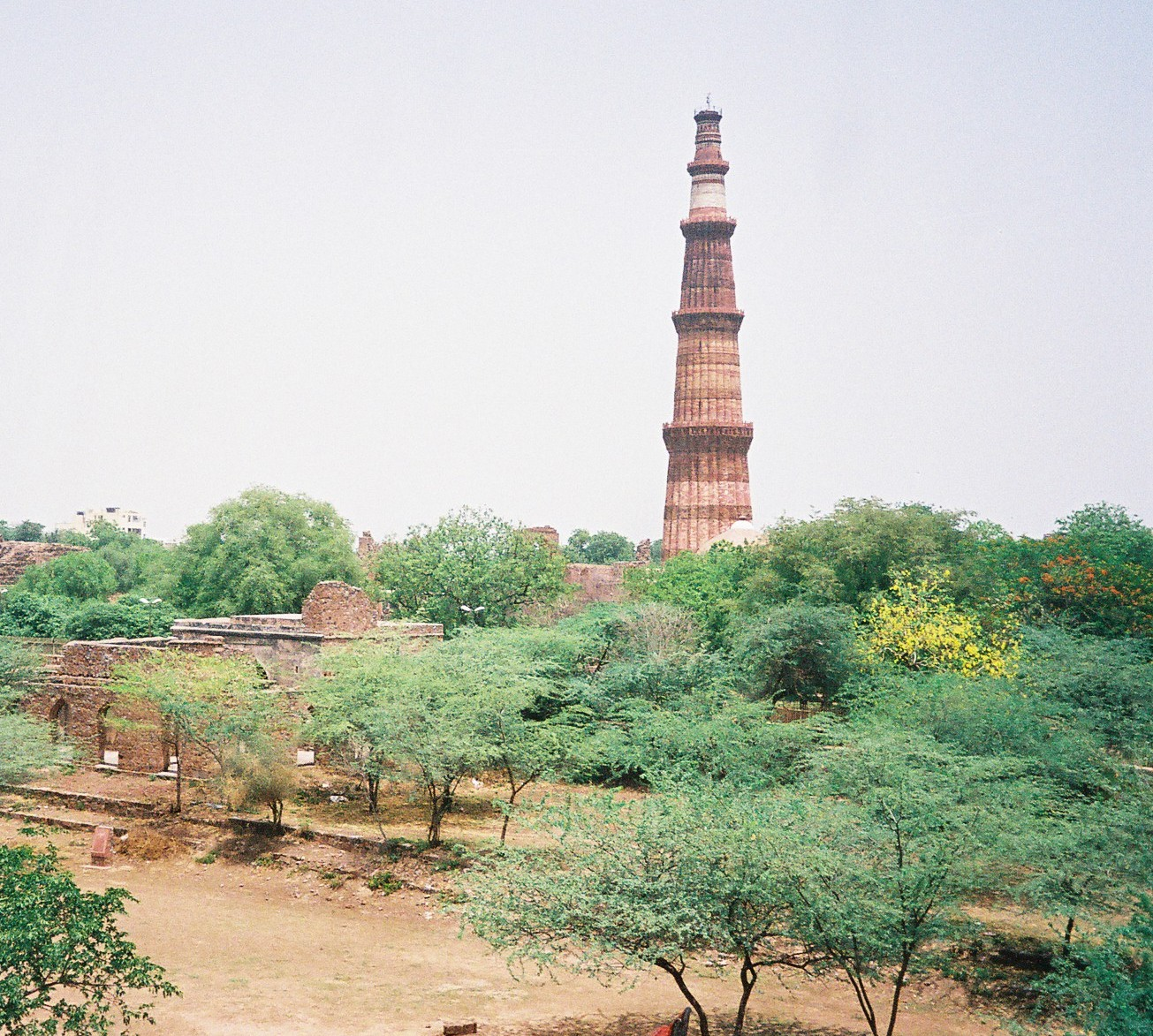
A Panoramic View of Qutub Minar from old Metcalfe house(Dilkhusha) with Guest House in the foreground on the left

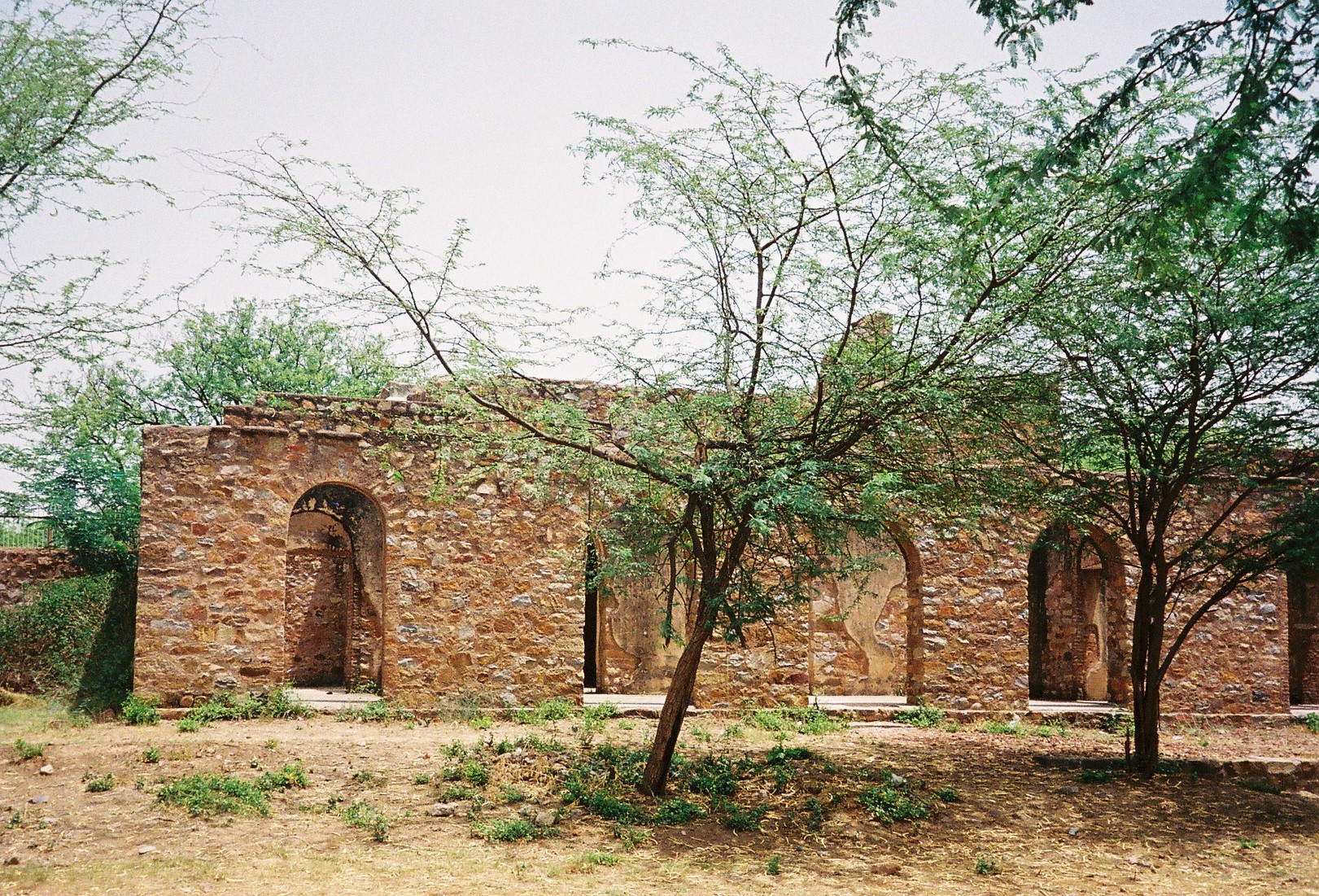
Metcalfe's Guest House in ruins

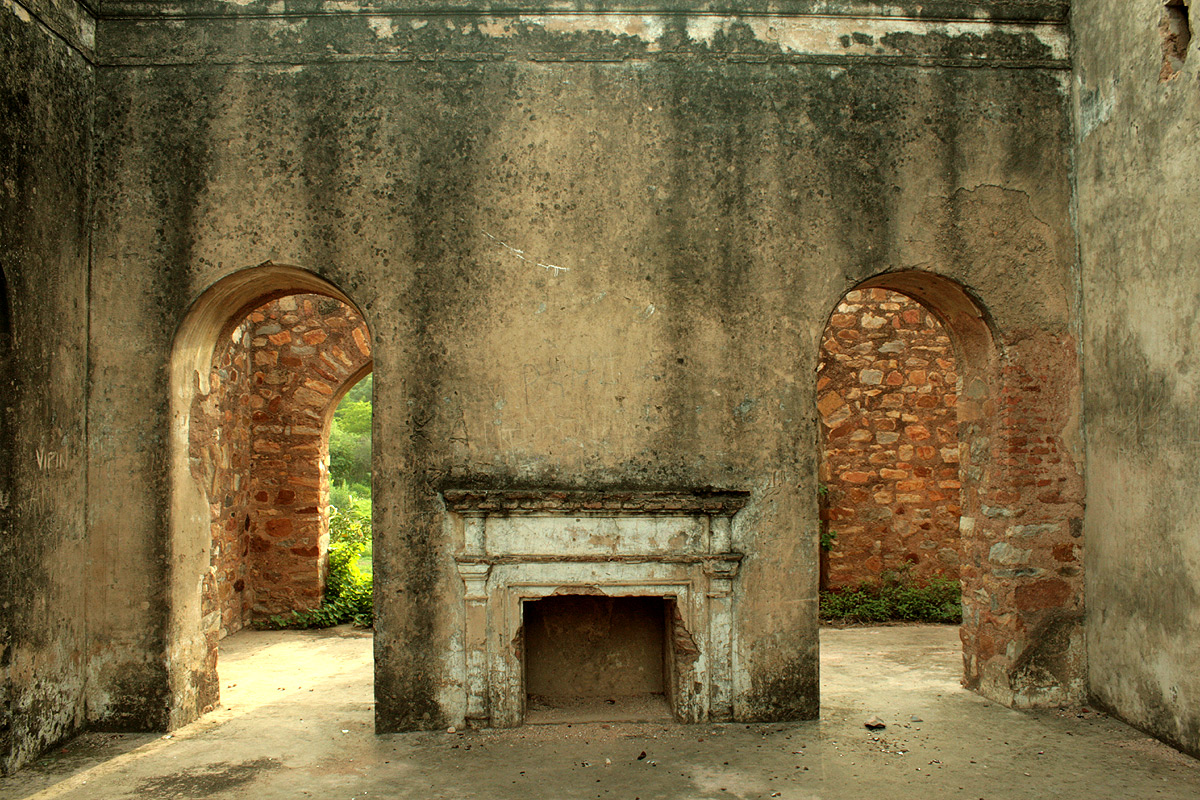
Ruins of Sir Thomas Metcalfe's Guest House at Dilkusha.

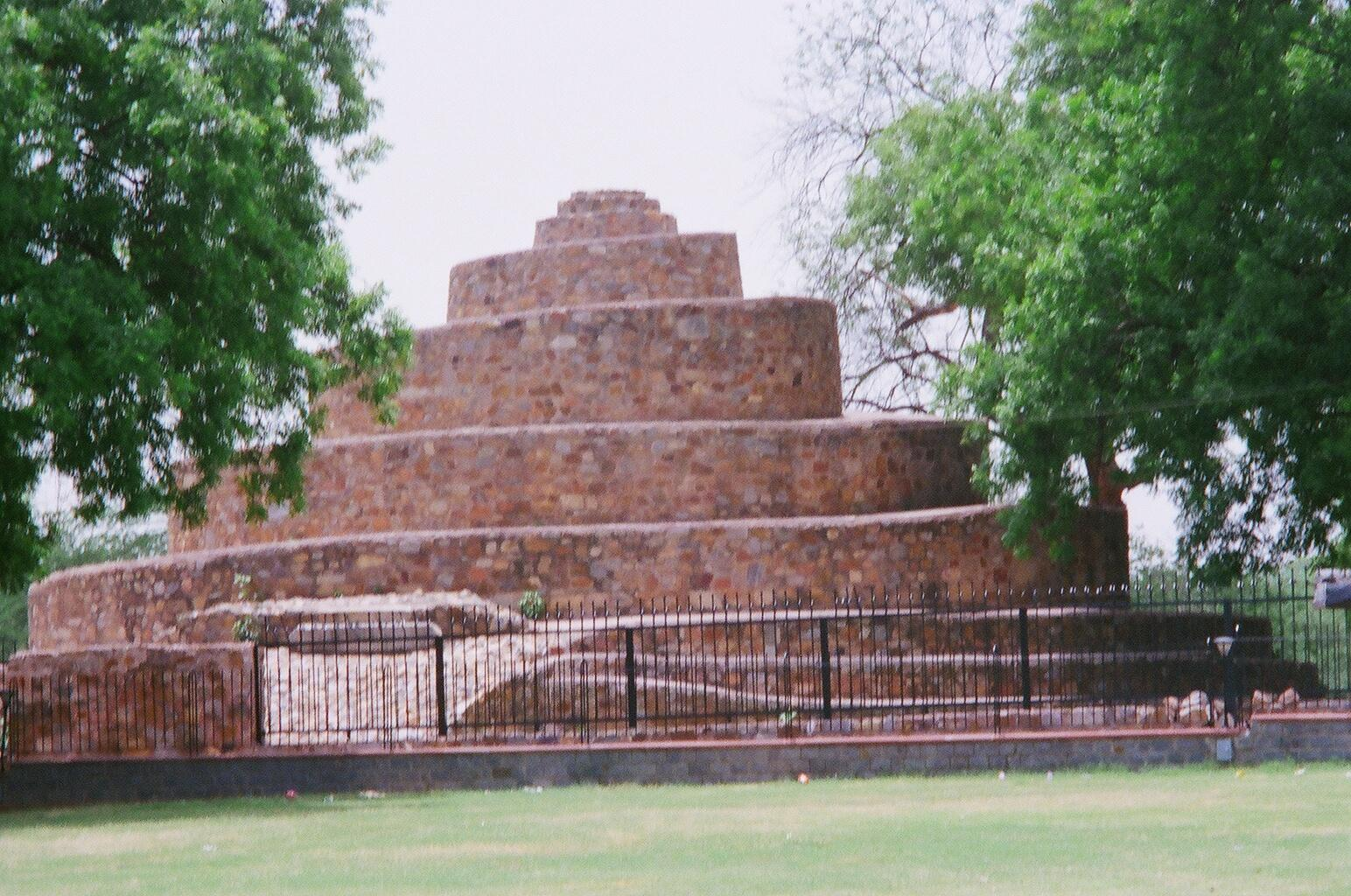
Ziggurat at entrance to Metcalfe house, Qutb complex

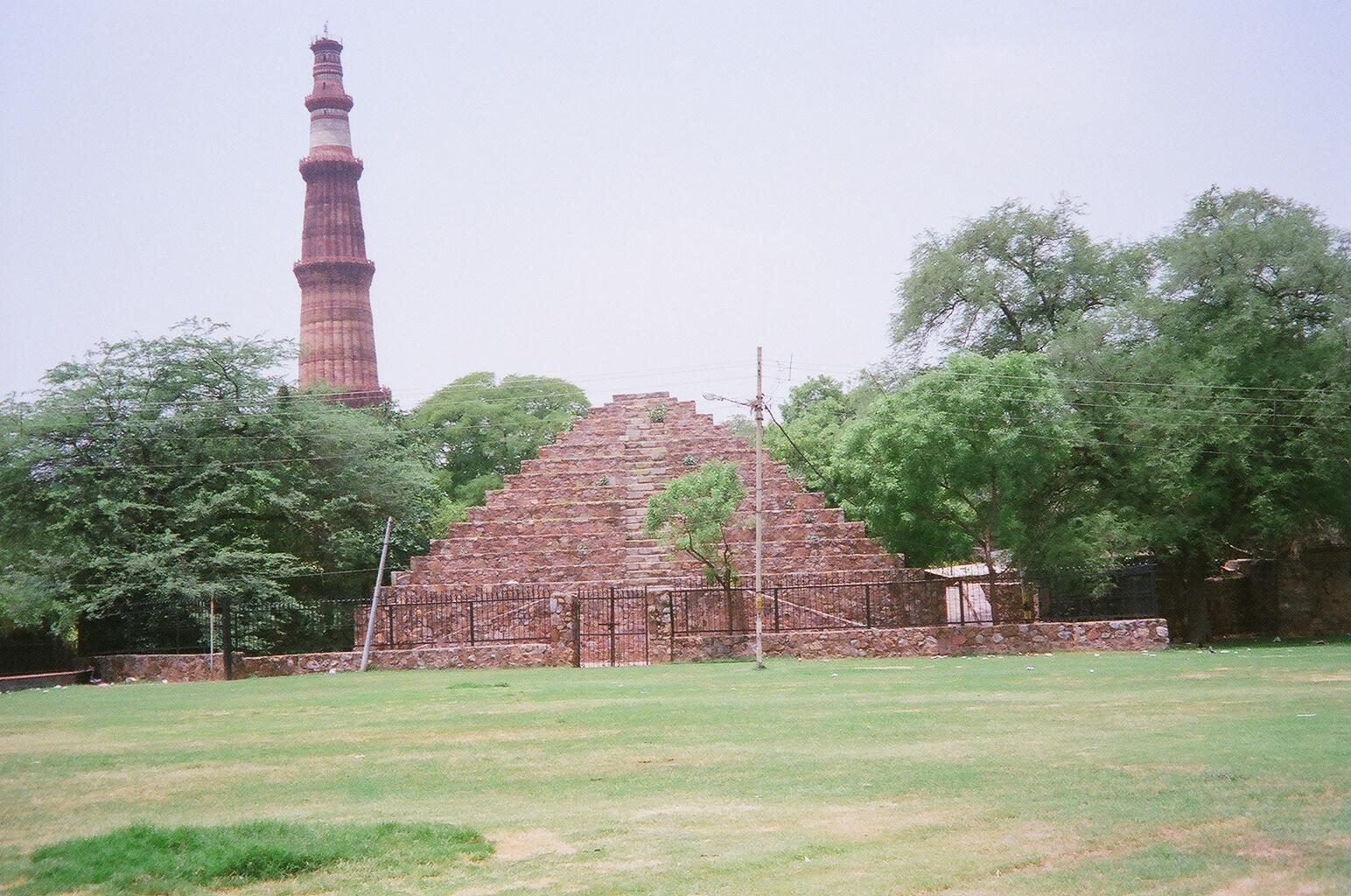
Another (Ziggurat) folly at entrance to Qutb Archaeological village, Mehrauli

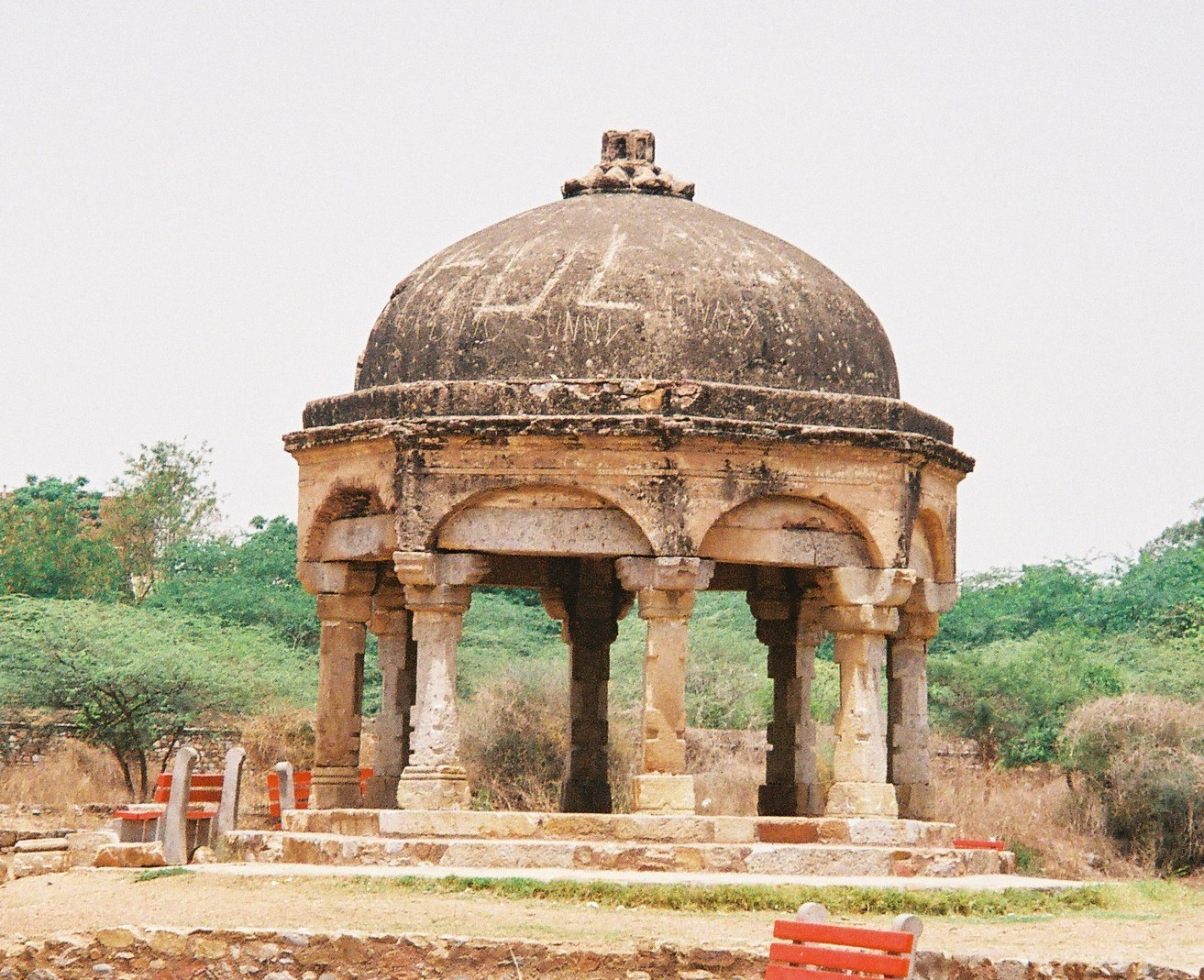
A popular Folly (Chhatri) built by Metcalfe
