= Theo Metcalfe =

British Bengal civil servant

Sir Theophilus John Metcalfe, 5th Baronet (1828–1883) was a British Bengal civil servant of the East India Company. He is noted for his part in the 1857 Indian Rebellion, and his vindictive behaviour in the aftermath.

== Early life ==
Born at Delhi on 28 November 1828, he was eldest son of Sir Thomas Theophilus Metcalfe, 4th Baronet, by his second wife, Felicite Browne, the daughter of J. Browne, of the Bengal Medical Board.

Theophilus Metcalfe was first sent to Addiscombe Military Seminary in Croydon, south London, but was moved to East India Company College in Hertfordshire, after an illness had cost him the use of his right eye, ruling out a military career. In 1848 he entered the Bengal Civil Service.

== Documentation of the Koh-i-Noor ==
In 1849, the Treaty of Lahore transferred possession of the Koh-i-Noor diamond from Maharaja Duleep Singh to Governor-General Lord Dalhousie. As part of preparations for sending the diamond to England, Dalhousie tasked Metcalfe with writing a history of the Koh-i-Noor. His instructions were "to collect and record as much accurate and interesting information regarding the Koh-i-Noor" as he could find. After interviewing courtiers, jewelers, and local gossips he drafted a report about which he said, "I cannot but regret that the results are so very meagre and imperfect". Still, this report was the earliest account of the history of the Koh-i-Noor which anyone has been able to find. Metcalfe's report is the basis for most histories of the Koh-i-Noor describing it before 1849.

== Activities during 1857 Indian Rebellion ==
Metcalfe joined his father at Delhi, and succeeded to the baronetcy in 1853. In 1857, Metcalfe was appointed joint-magistrate and deputy-collector, first grade, at Meerut, and deputy-collector at Futtepore. On the morning of 11 May 1857 he brought information to Delhi that Meerut mutineers of the previous day were crossing the river to the city. He aided the escape of European inhabitants, and himself reached safety with the help of the Nawab of Jhajjar.

Metcalfe went to George Anson's army at Kurnaul. On 6 June, he was there when the Corps of Guides arrived on its march towards the siege of Delhi. He diverted the Guides into punitive attacks on villages, and the corps was delayed from the Battle of Badli-ki-Serai.

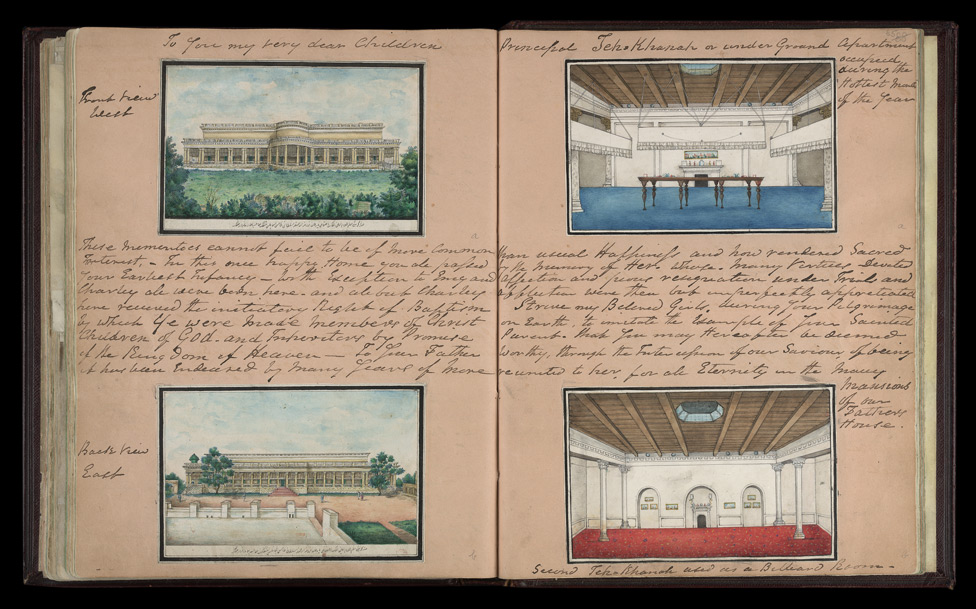
Views of Metcalfe House, Delhi, from 1843

At Delhi Metcalfe led the cavalry that attacked the rebels' rear at the Battle of Najafgarh, and, during the assault of 14 September, guided George Campbell, with the 52nd light infantry, in the street fighting. The family residence, Metcalfe House in Delhi, had been gutted by the rebels, and burned. After Delhi fell, Metcalfe exacted retribution. He did not intervene to save the Nawab of Jhajjar, and the impression was gained that he, rather than the commissioner Charles Saunders, was in charge.

Metcalfe was appointed assistant to the agent at Delhi and deputy-collector at Futtepore in 1858, and went home on sick furlough in 1859. Ill-health prevented his return to India. He was made C.B. in 1864, and retired on an invalid pension in 1866. He died in Paris, on 10 November 1883, aged 54.

== Family ==
Metcalfe married: first, in 1851, Charlotte, daughter of Sir John Low, died at Simla in 1853, leaving one child, Sir Charles Herbert Theophilus Metcalfe, 6th Baronet (1853–1928), a civil engineer; and secondly, in 1876, Katherine Hawkins, daughter of James Whitehead Dempster of Dunnichen, Forfarshire.

== Notes ==
Baronetage of the United Kingdom
Preceded by Thomas Metcalfe	Baronet (of Chilton); 1853–1883	Succeeded by Charles Metcalfe
