= Sir Thomas Metcalfe, 4th Baronet =

East India Company administrator (1795–1853)

Sir Thomas Metcalfe, Bt
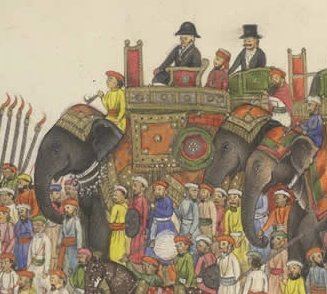
- Sir Thomas Metcalfe, Bt, on a picture from the Delhi Book
- Born: 2 January 1795; Portland Place, London
- Died: 3 November 1853 (aged 58); Metcalfe House, Delhi, British India
- Resting place: St. James' Church near Kashmiri Gate, Delhi; 28°39′56.2″N 77°13′53.5″E
- Occupation: Governor-General's Agent at the Imperial court of the Mughal Emperor
- Employer: East India Company
- Title: Baronet
- Successor: Sir Theophilus Metcalfe, 5th Baronet
- Spouse(s): Grace Clarke (1815–?); Felicite Anne Browne (1826–1842; her death)
- Children: Sir Theophilus John Metcalfe, 5th Baronet; Emily Ann Theophila Metcalfe; Charles Theophilus Metcalfe; Georgiana Charlotte Theophila Metcalfe; Eliza Theophila Debonnaire Metcalfe; Sophia Selena Theophila Metcalfe

Sir Thomas Theophilus Metcalfe, 4th Baronet, (2 January 1795 – 3 November 1853) was an East India Company civil servant and agent of the Governor General of India at the imperial court of the Mughal Emperor Bahadur Shah Zafar.

== Biography ==
Sir Thomas Theophilus Metcalfe was born on 2 January 1795 at 49 Portland Place, London, and christened on 27 March 1795 in St Marylebone Parish Church, London. He arrived in Delhi in 1813 and lived there for forty years. His elder brother, Charles (1785–1846), was Resident to the Mughal Emperor's court, and briefly the provisional Governor General of Bengal (1835–36). He married Felicite Anne Browne on 13 July 1826.

In 1830, Metcalfe began to build the "Metcalfe House" on the outskirts of Delhi, taking land belonging to Gurjar villagers. He filled it with his collections of art, books and relics of Napoleon. The Metcalfe House was called Matka Kothi by the bearers and khansamahs (chefs) serving Sir Thomas, as they found it difficult to pronounce the name Metcalfe.

In 1835, Metcalfe became the agent at Delhi after the murder of William Fraser and ran the "Delhi Territory", the area around the old capital under British control since 1803. He succeeded his brother as Baronet in 1844, and became an important figure in the cultural climate of Delhi.

While working in India as the Governor-General's Agent at the Imperial court of the Mughal Emperor, between 1842 and 1844, Metcalfe ordered a series of images of the monuments, ruins, palaces and shrines from Delhi artist named Mazhar Ali Khan, and later an album termed as Reminiscences of Imperial Delhi (also Dehlie Book or Delhi Album) was compiled by Metcalfe in 1844, containing 89 folios around 130 paintings by Indian artists, and including descriptive text and touching words and was sent to his daughter Emily as she headed from an English schooling to join him in Delhi. The album has now been acquired by the British Library.

During the rainy season he used to stay at 'Dilkusha' (Delight of the Heart), which was built on the first floor of the tomb of Mohammed Quli Khan, brother of Adham Khan, general of Mughal Emperor, Akbar, situated south east of the Qutb complex in Mehrauli, an area which was also the traditional retreat of the Mughals for the season.

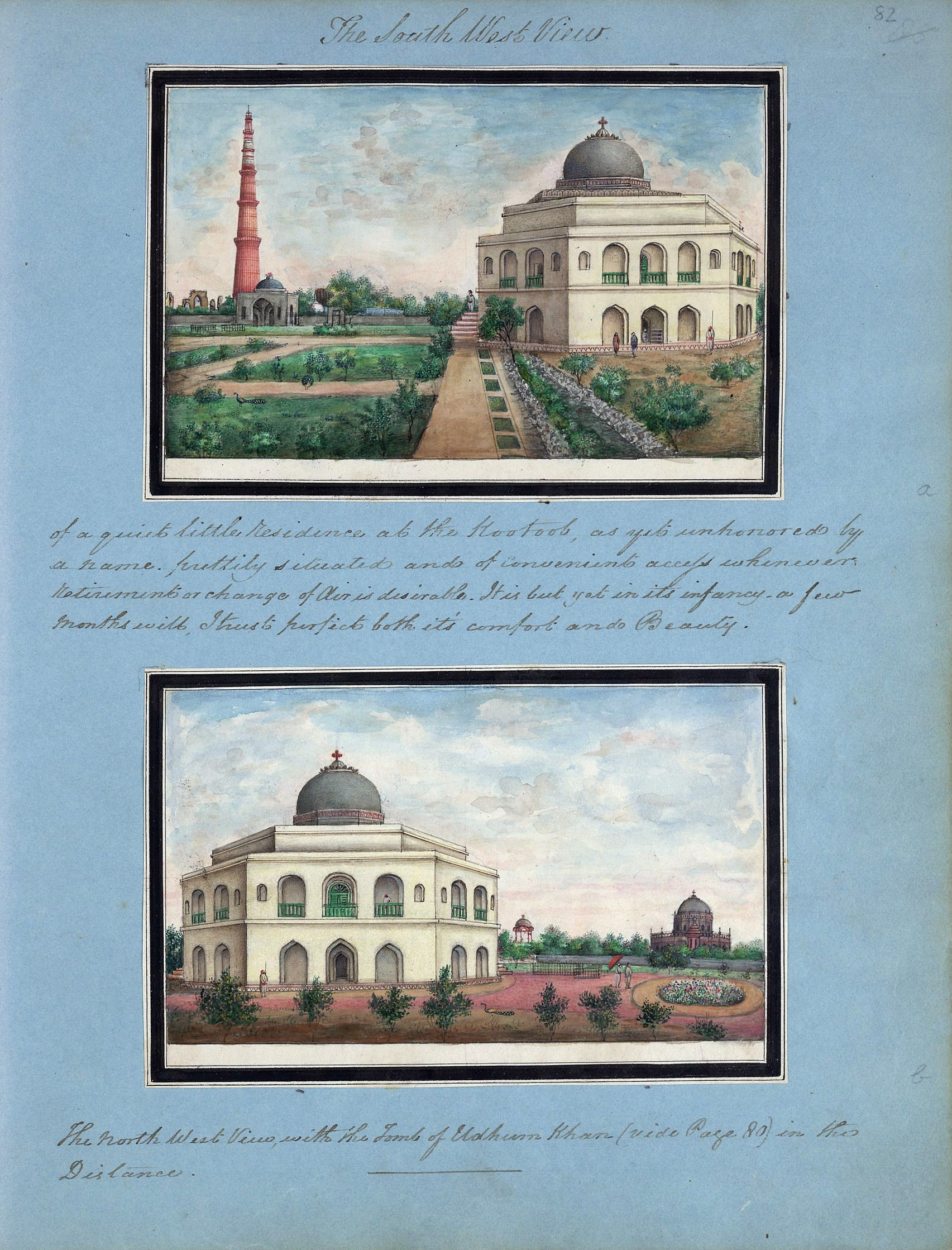
Dilkhusa (Delight of the Heart) the country house of Metcalfe, in Mehrauli, Metcalfe album, 1843

While his main house was a colonial bungalow, built in 1844, its library contained over 20,000 books including Napoleon memorabilia. During the Indian Rebellion of 1857, the house was sacked by the Gurjar villagers from whom the land was bought to erect the building and the library was destroyed and looted.

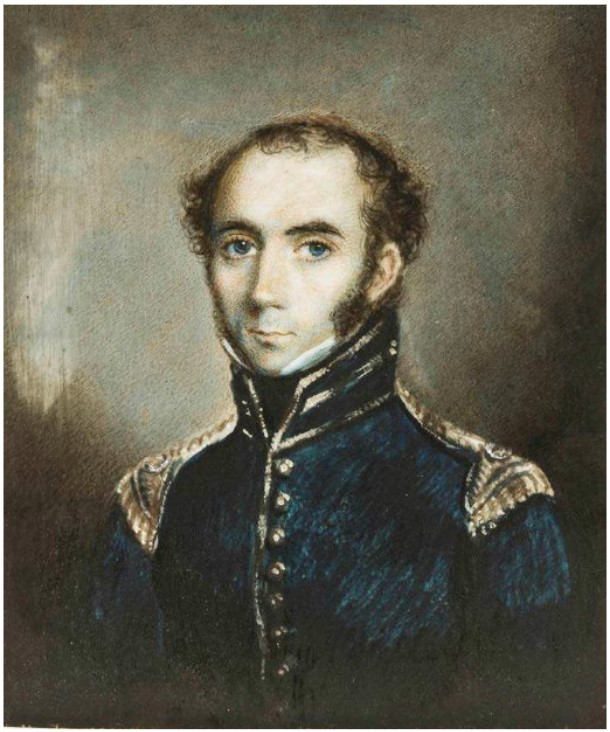
Portrait of an East India Company man, perhaps Thomas Theophilus Metcalfe, a painting by Jivan Ram, Agra, 1824

=== Family ===
His father was Sir Thomas Theophilus Metcalfe, 1st Baronet and his mother was Susannah Sophia Selina Debonnaire. His father first went to India in 1767 as a cadet in the East India Company Army, eventually becoming a Director of the British East India Company.

He married, firstly, Grace Clarke, daughter of Alexander Clarke, on 7 June 1815, by whom he had one daughter. He married, secondly, to Felicite Anne Browne, on 13 July 1826, by whom he had one son and two daughters. He was succeeded in his title by his eldest son, Sir Theophilus John Metcalfe, 5th Baronet, who was also in the Indian Civil Service.

=== Death ===
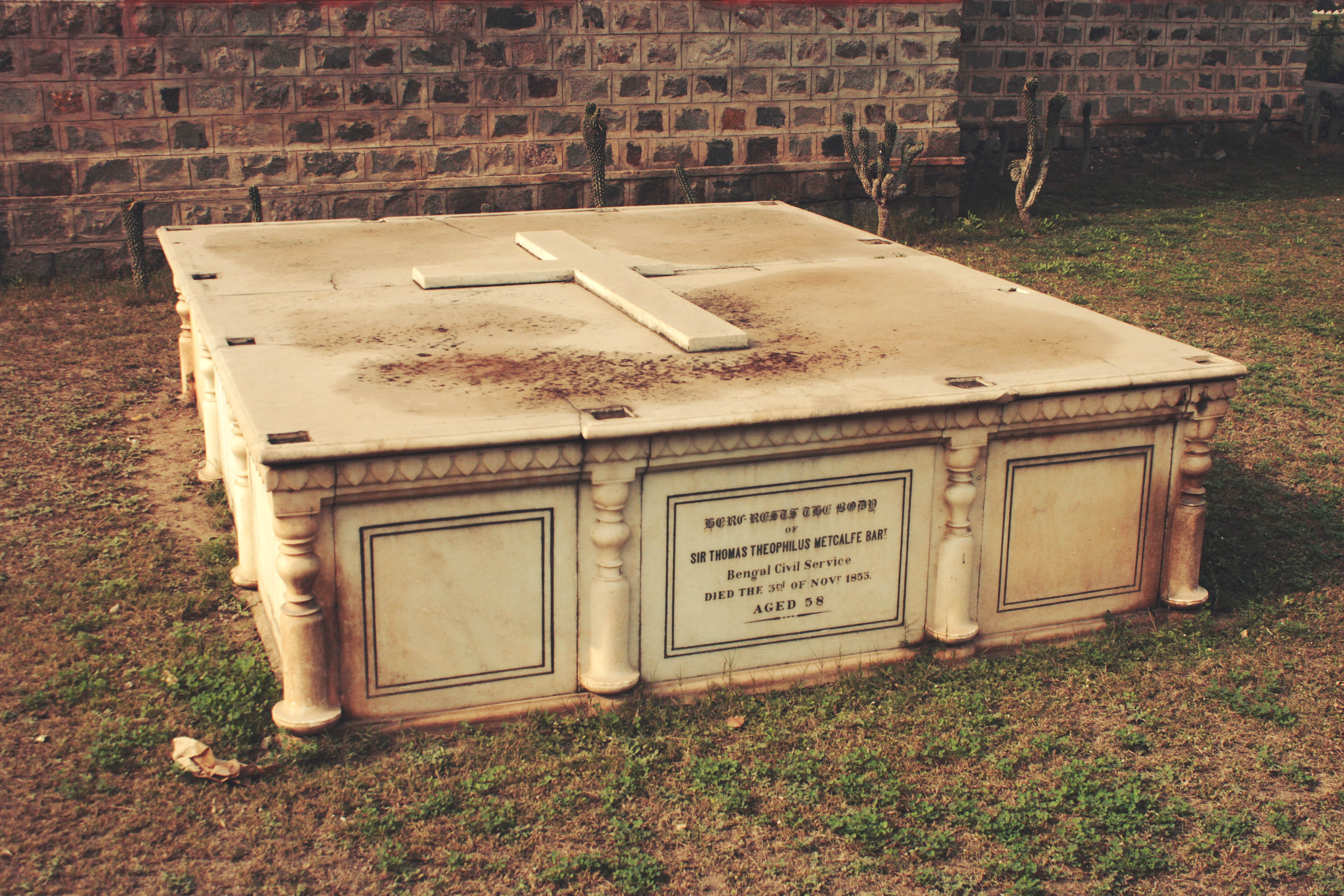
The tomb of Sir Thomas Metcalfe at St. James' Church near Kashmiri Gate, Delhi

In 1853 Metcalfe suffered a digestive disorder which led to his slow death. His doctors believed that the ailment was caused by poison, since the symptoms were similar to those seen in certain "inconvenient" high ranking members of the Mughal royal family such as Mirza Fakhru who was a friend of Metcalfe. Metcalfe's family, and Metcalfe himself, suspected that he was being administered poison on the instructions of Zinat Mahal, the last Mughal emperor Bahadur Shah's favorite wife. He was buried in a grave to the east of the Skinner Family's cemetery, at the St. James' Church near Kashmiri Gate, Delhi.

== Reminiscences of Imperial Delhi ==
Reminiscences of Imperial Delhi, also called the Delhi Book, is an album consisting of 89 folios with approximately 130 paintings by Indian artists. The paintings depict Mughal and pre-Mughal monuments of Delhi, the lives of native Indians as well as other contemporary material. Metcalfe added extensive descriptions to almost all paintings. He had assembled the album to be a gift for his daughters in England, and he sent it to them in 1844. The most important feature of the album is that it shows buildings as they were before the siege of Delhi during the Indian Mutiny. Many of these structures were razed, vandalized or suffered neglect in the years following the Mutiny.

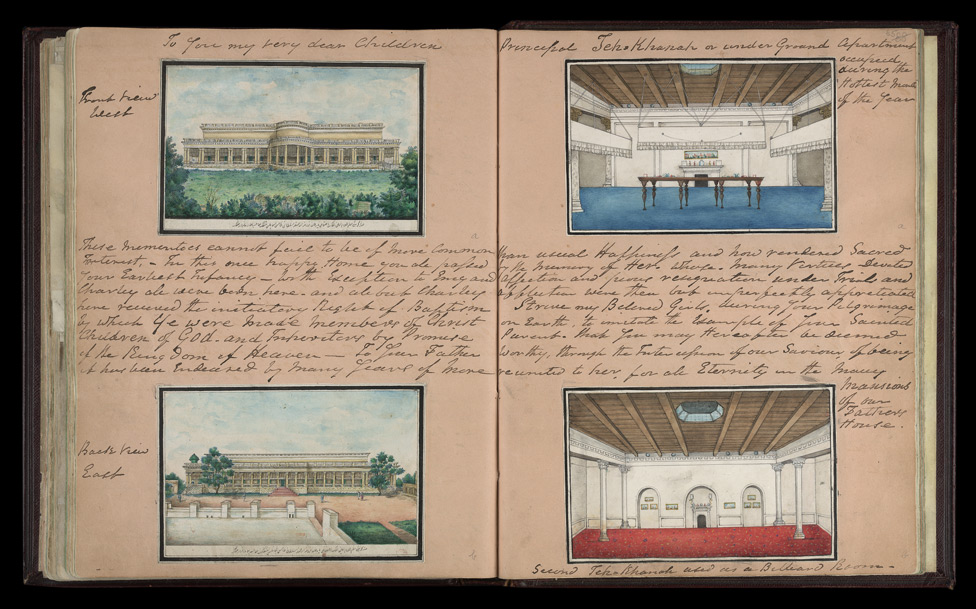
Different views of the Metcalfe House, Delhi, 1843, which now houses the Laser Science and Technology Centre (DRDO).

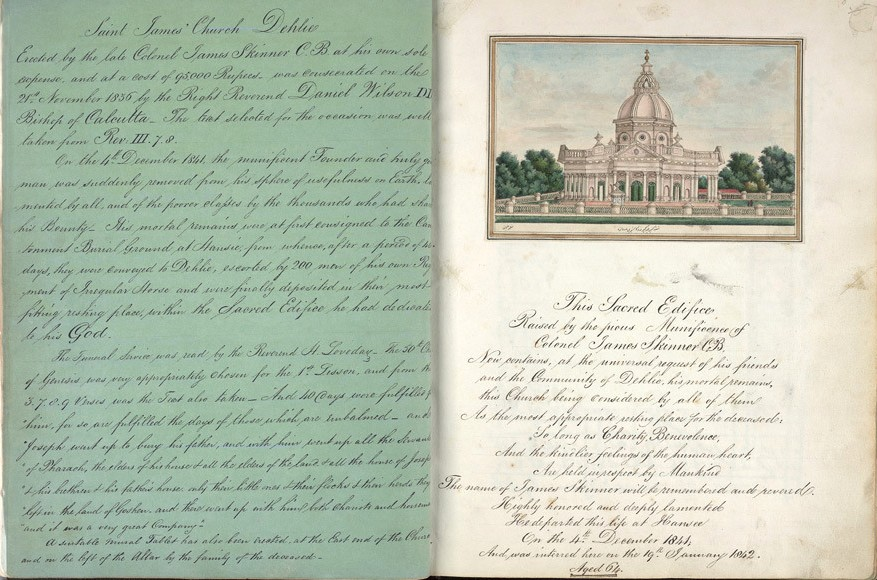
St. James' Church, Delhi

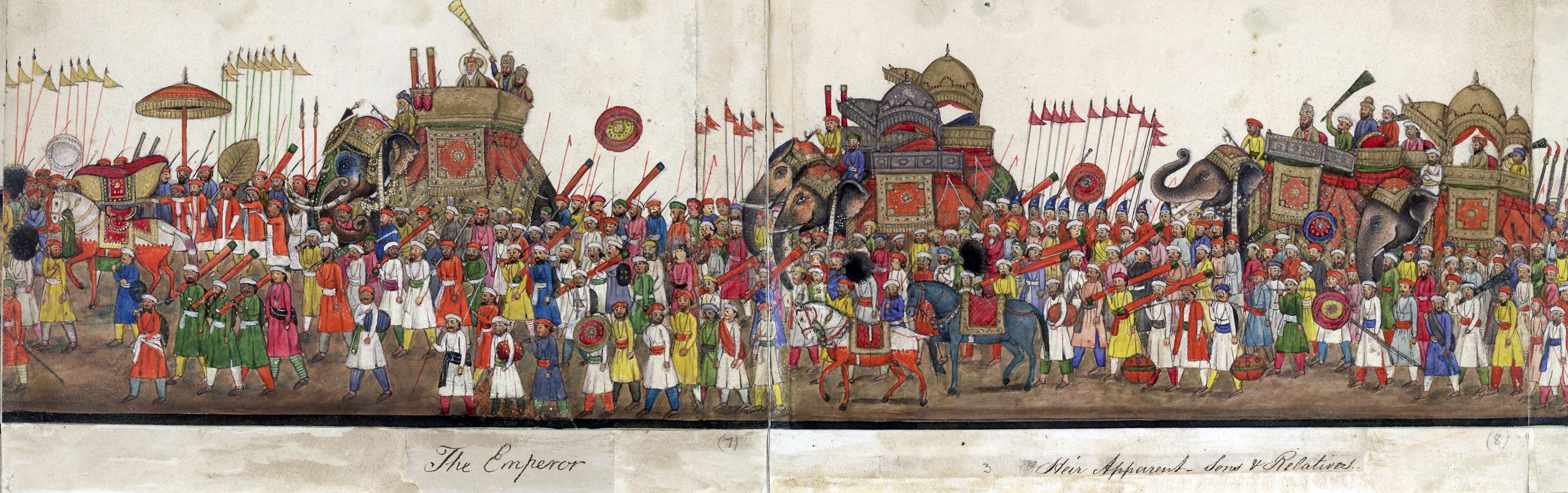
A panorama in 12 folds showing the procession of the Emperor Bahadur Shah Zafar II to celebrate the feast of the 'Id., 1843.

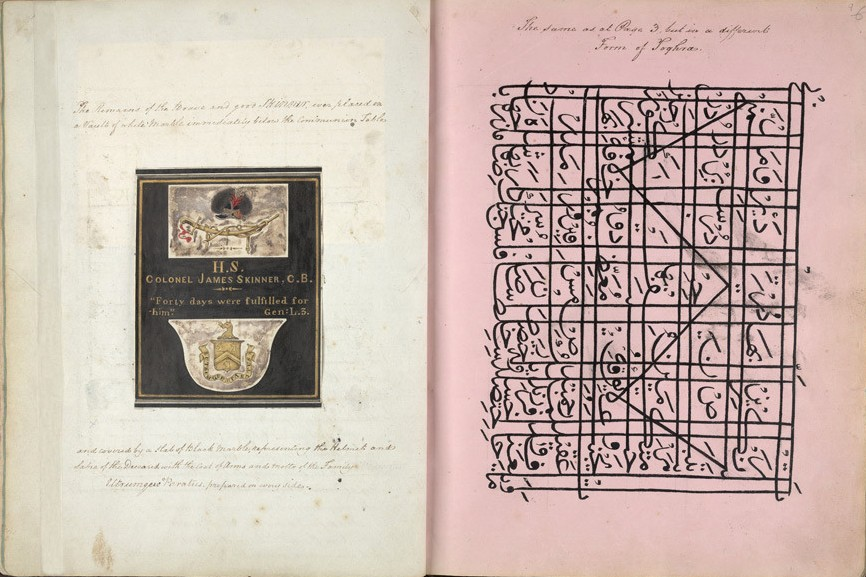
Details of the tomb of Colonel James Skinner C.B. at St. James' Church, Delhi, and Styles and titles in Persian of Metcalfe as Agent of Governor-General of India (right page)

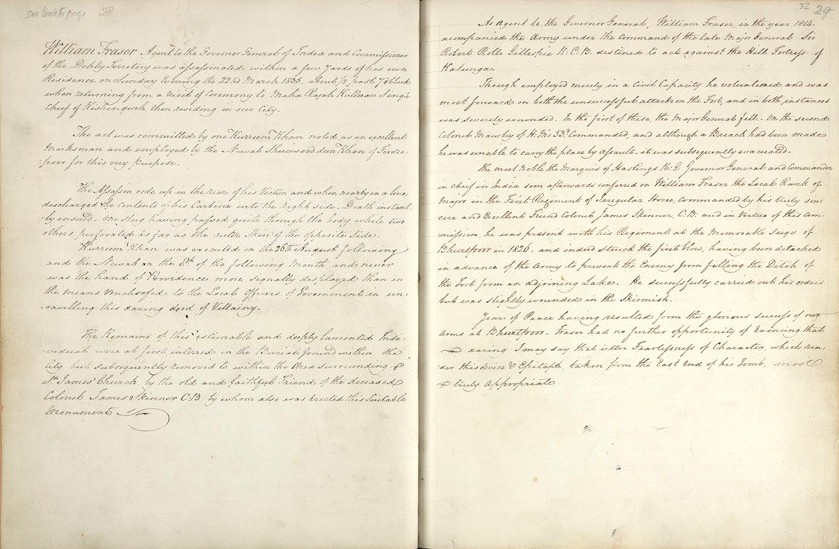
Description of assassination of William Frazer, Agent to the Governor-General of India, on 22 March 1835, in Delhi.

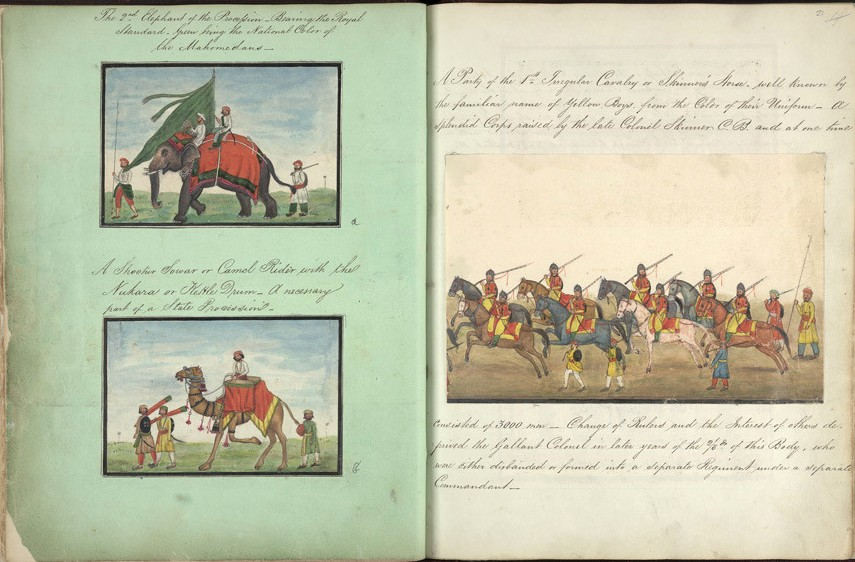
Scenes from a Royal procession, and a party of Skinner's Horse regiment.

== Architectural legacy ==
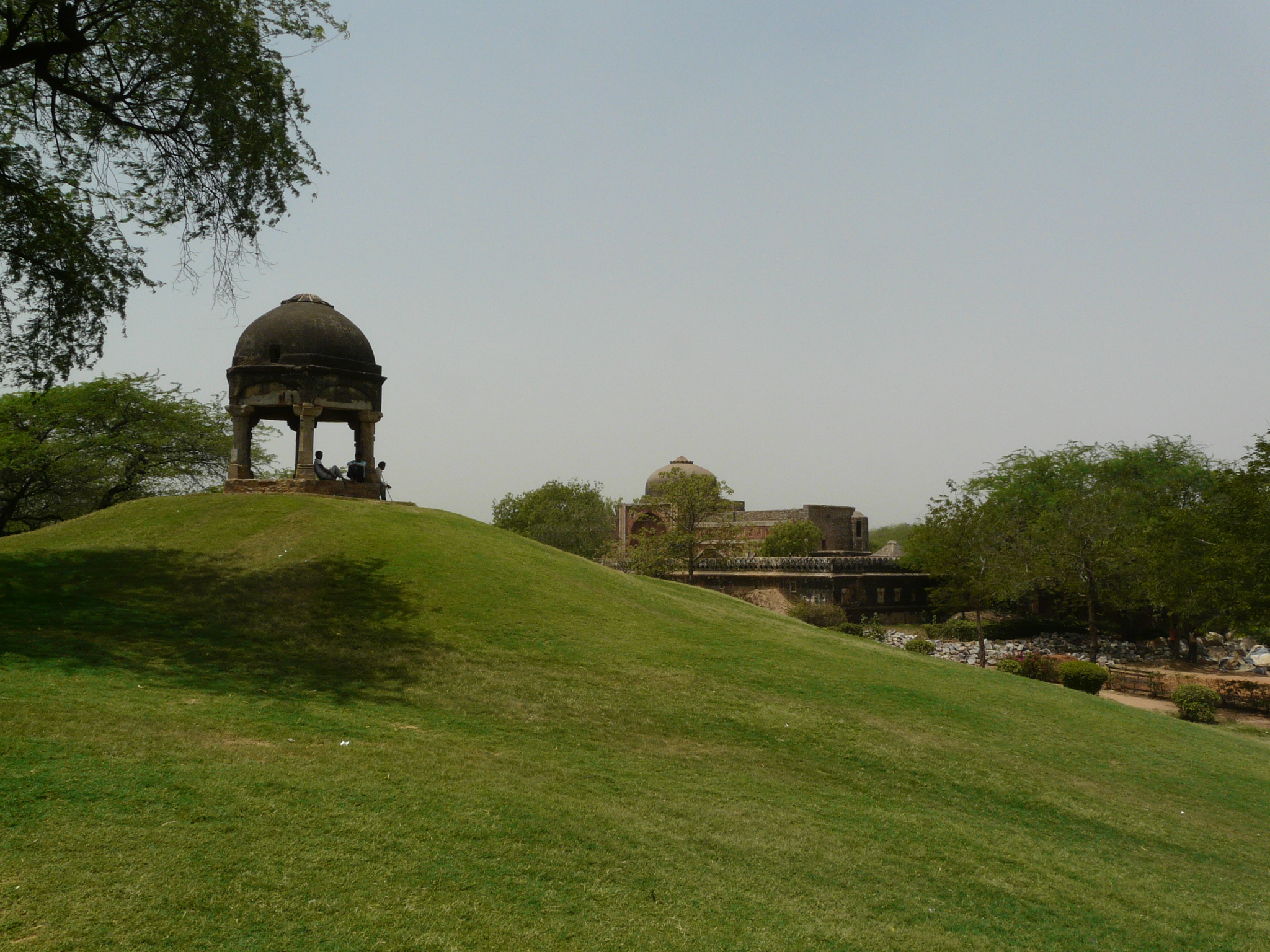
One of Metcalfe's "follies", a chhatri, with Jamali Kamali Mosque in the background, Mehrauli.

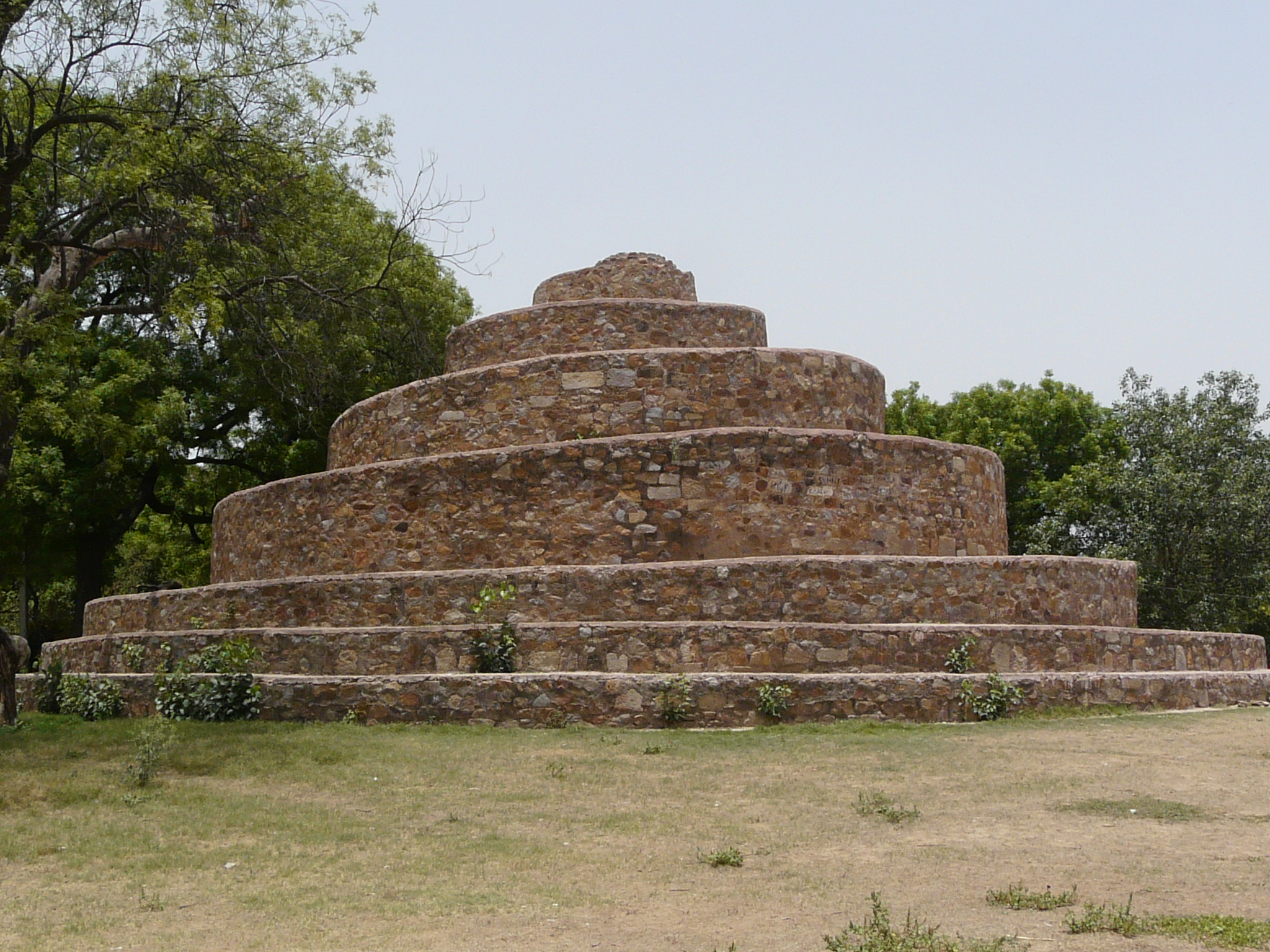
Another of Metcalf's follies, close to the Qutb Minar parking lot, Mehrauli.

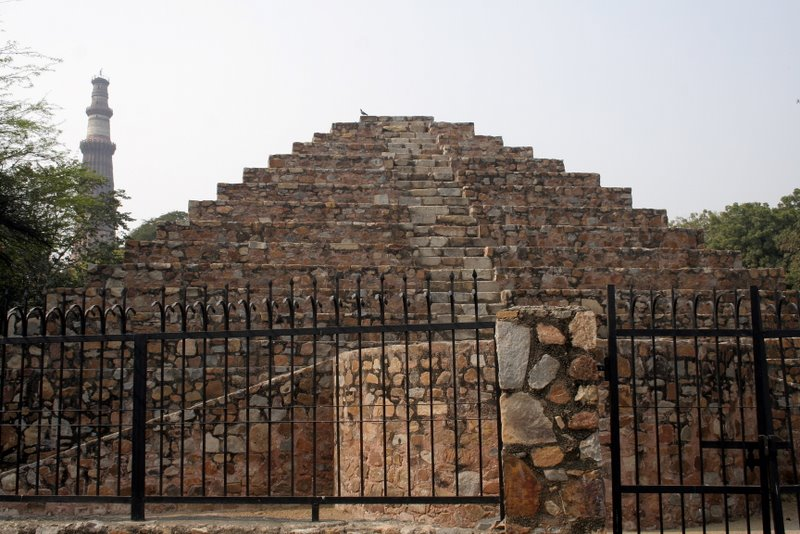
Metcalf's Folly near Qutab Minar

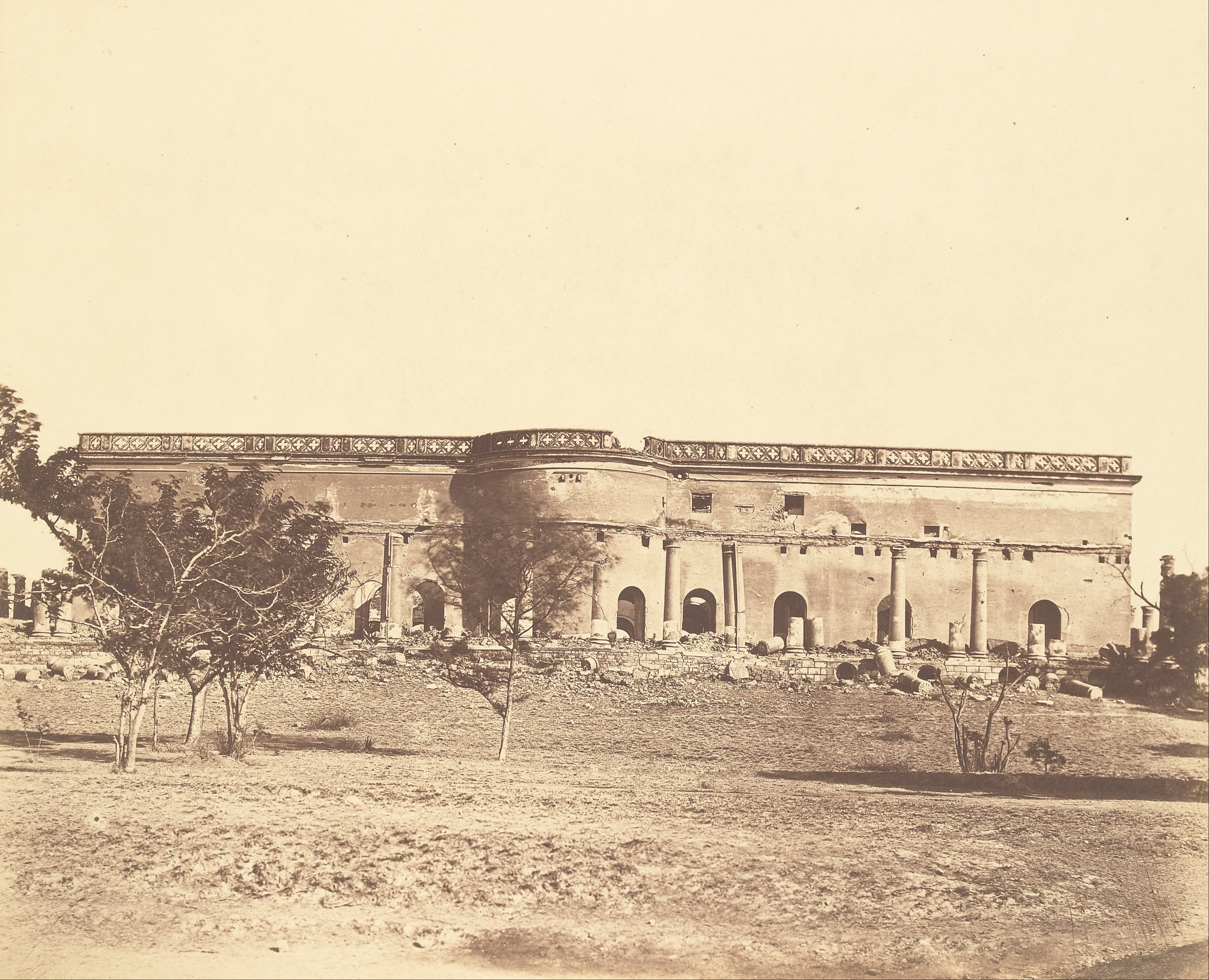
The Metcalfe Town House in 1858, by Felice Beato

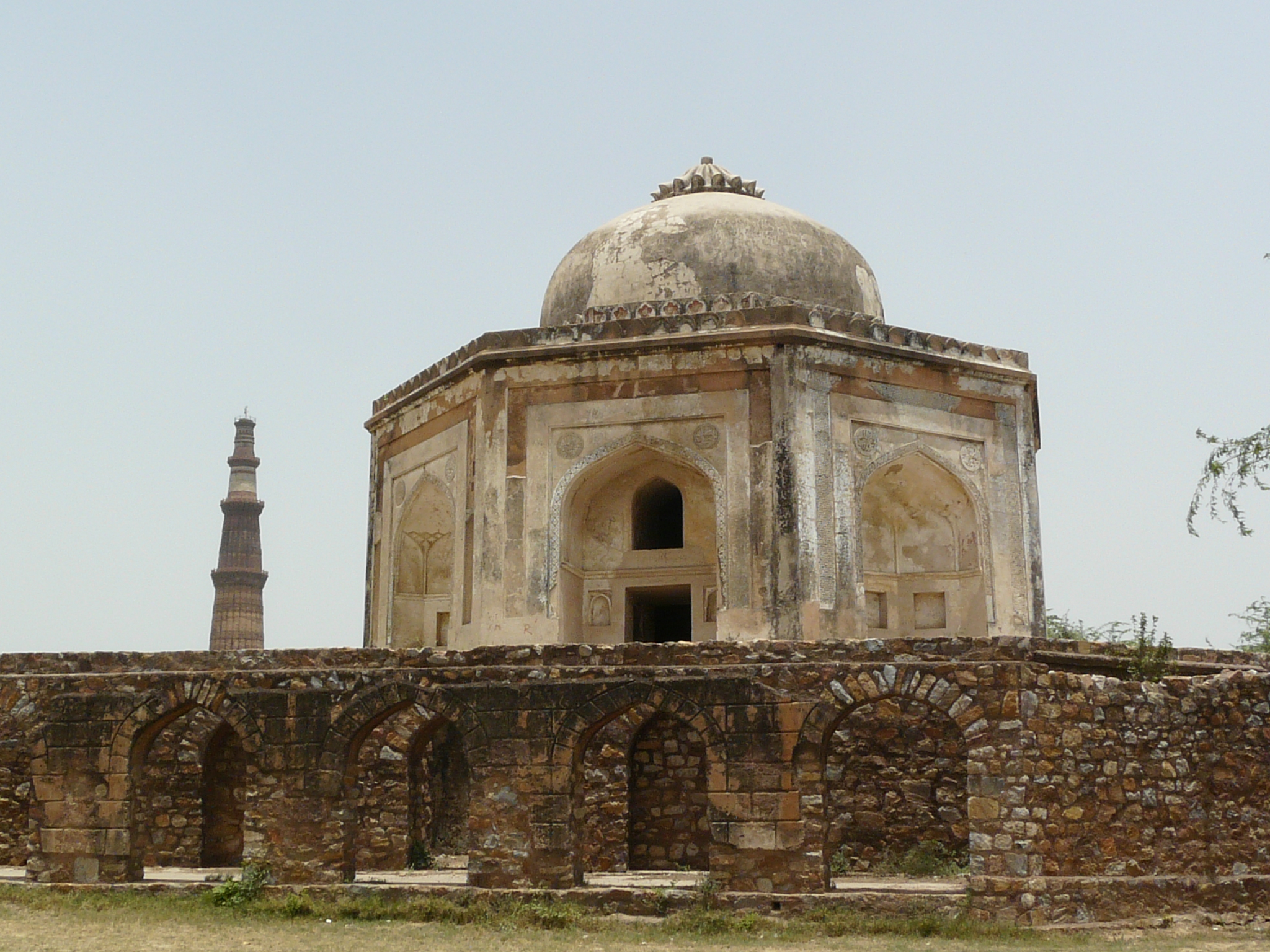
Dilkusha with Qutb Minar in the background, Mehrauli

== Sources ==
- Genealogy of Metcalfes
- Detailed description of Metcalfe House Delhi, 1843 British Library.

Baronetage of the United Kingdom
Preceded by Charles Theophilus Metcalfe	Baronet (of Chilton); 1846–1853	Succeeded by Theophilus John Metcalfe
