= Jasper Clayton =

British Army general

Lieutenant-General Jasper Clayton
- Died: 27 June 1743; Wingfield, Buckinghamshire
- Military career
- Allegiance: Kingdom of Great Britain
- Branch: British Army
- Rank: Lieutenant-General
- Conflicts: War of Spanish Succession; War of Austrian Succession

Lieutenant-General Jasper Clayton (died 27 June 1743) was Governor of Gibraltar.

== Military career ==
Born the son of Sir John Clayton and Alice (Bowyer) Clayton, Jasper Clayton lived at Fernhill in Buckinghamshire. He chose to join the army and climbed the ranks to become a lieutenant general. In 1707, during the War of the Spanish Succession, he was present at the Battle of Almansa.

In 1713 he was made colonel of the 14th Regiment of Foot. He commanded a brigade during the suppression of the 1715 Jacobite Rising in Scotland.

He was appointed Lieutenant-Governor of Gibraltar in 1727, remaining there until 1730. He fought in the War of Austrian Succession and was killed at the Battle of Dettingen in 1743. He is buried at Wingfield in Buckinghamshire.

== Sources ==
- Lyons, Adam (2014). The 1711 Expedition to Quebec: Politics And The Limitations Of British Global Strategy. Bloomsbury Academic. ISBN 978-1472581693.

Government offices
Preceded by Richard Kane	Governor of Gibraltar; 1727–1730	Succeeded by Joseph Sabine
Military offices
Preceded by Philip Honywood	Colonel of Clayton's Regiment of Foot; 1710–1712	Regiment disbanded
Preceded by John Tidcomb	Colonel of Clayton's Regiment of Foot; 1713–1743	Succeeded by John Price
