= Rajiv Gandhi Bhawan =

Airports Authority of India headquarters

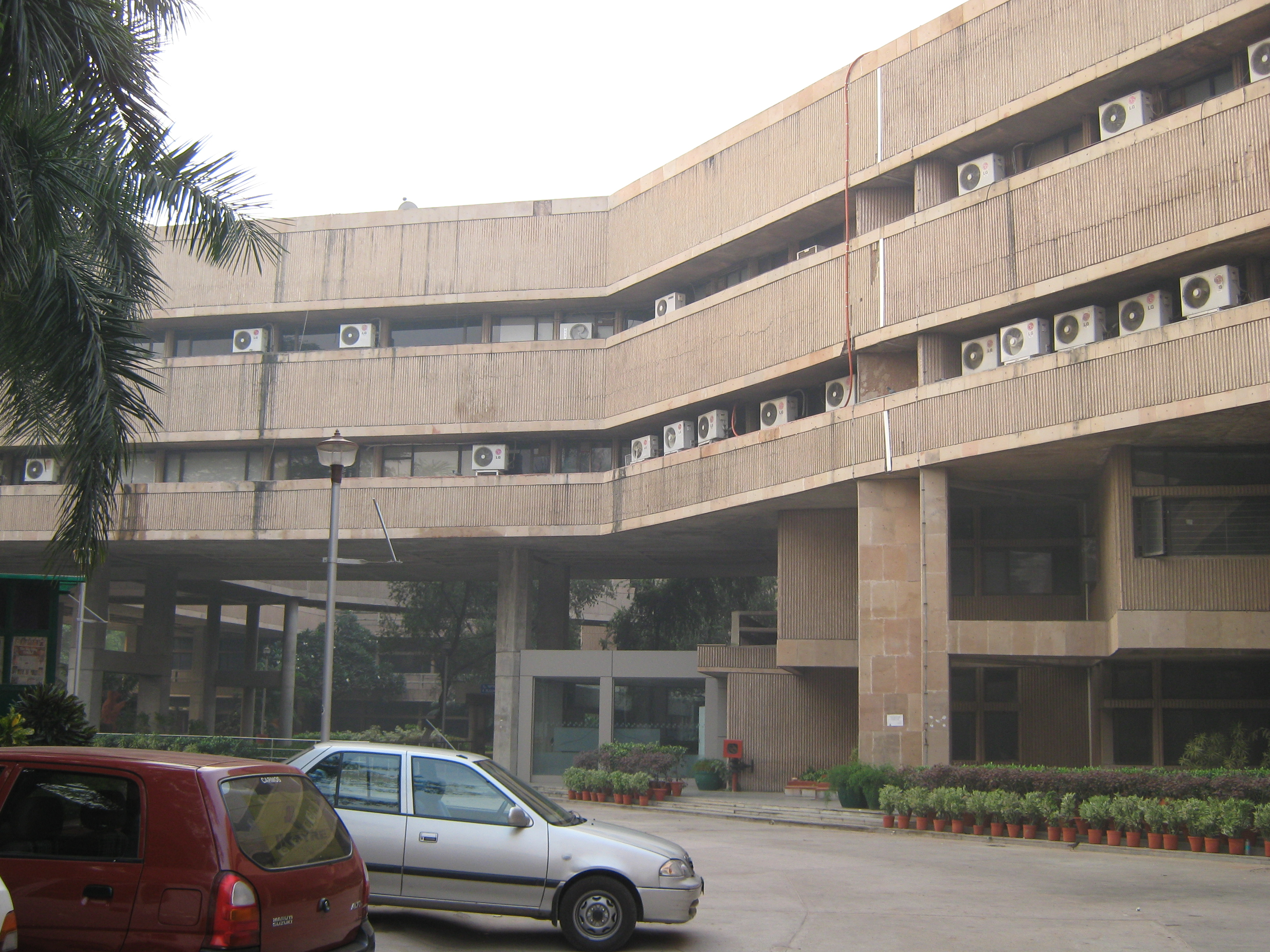
Rajiv Gandhi Bhawan

Rajiv Gandhi Bhawan is the corporate headquarters of Airports Authority of India (AAI). AAI also functions under the Ministry of Civil Aviation and manages most of the airports in India. The Indian Ministry of Civil Aviation is co-located in the same building.

Mehro Consultants was involved in the design of the building. It has been used as a metonym for the Ministry of Civil Aviation.

It is named after Rajiv Gandhi.

== Design ==
The building has a unique plan. This can be seen in the picture opposite, showing the aerial view as seen from the satellite. This building is on the Aurobindo Marg, with Safdarjung's Tomb adjacent on the right-hand side and the Aero Club of India on the left, and near Safdarjung Airport.
