= Aero Club of India =

National Airsport Control of India

- Sport: Air sports
- Jurisdiction: India
- Membership: 22 flying clubs
- Abbreviation: ACI
- Founded: 19 September 1927; 98 years ago
- Affiliation: Fédération Aéronautique Internationale
- Affiliation date: 1950
- Headquarters: Safdarjung Airport, Aurobindo Marg, New Delhi
- President: Rajiv Pratap Rudy
- Vice president: Milind Mahajan

Official website
- aeroclubofindia.in
- (India)

The Aero Club of India (ACI) is a non-governmental governing body for air sports in India, recognised as the National Airsport Control representing India by the Fédération Aéronautique Internationale (FAI), since 1950. ACI is legally registered as a non-profit, non-commercial organization.

The ACI was founded in 1927 as the Royal Aero Club of India and Burma Ltd. Prior to India's independence in 1947, the organization had vast regulatory powers including the authority to issue flying licences to pilots and to approve certified flight instructors, and to issue licences for arms and wireless facilities to foreign aviators. However, most of these powers were transferred to government agencies after independence. The ACI lost nearly all of its regulatory powers after the formation of the Directorate General of Civil Aviation (DGCA).

== History ==
The ACI was founded by businessman and hotelier Victor Sassoon as the Royal Aero Club of India and Burma Ltd. (RACIB) on 19 September 1927. The club's primary objectives were to create awareness of air sports in the country, and to provide training to people seeking employment in commercial aviation. The club was patronized by the British Indian government since its inception with the viceroy of India and Burma serving as its patron-in-chief, the commander-in-chief of India serving as its president, and the director general of posts and telegraphs serving as the vice president. RACIB's constitution was very similar to that of the Royal Aero Club of Great Britain. RACIB received affiliation from the Royal Aero Club and the Societe Aviation Internationale.

RACIB sought to establish flying clubs across the country in order to achieve its founding objectives. The first such club, the Delhi Flying Club, was formed in May 1928. RACIB subsequently established flying clubs in Karachi (in present-day Pakistan), Allahabad, Calcutta and Bombay. RACIB received financial assistance from the government to acquire two Pussmoth aircraft for each flying club. The government also assisted in the flying club's financial operations. The first flying licence was issued by RACIB to J.R.D. Tata in 1929. Tata would go on to make India's first commercial flight on 15 October 1932. Tata donated the plane used to make the flight to the Aero Club of India in 1985. Today, it is displayed, suspended from the ceiling, at the ACI's headquarters at Safdarjung Airport.

RACIB essentially operated as a branch of the Royal Aero Club of Great Britain until India's independence. In the years preceding independence, RACIB had suspended all of its operations due to World War II. Post-independence in 1947, RACIB was re-constituted as the Aero Club of India Ltd. (ACI). India's first Prime Minister Jawaharlal Nehru served as the organization's first President, and Constituent Assembly member H.N. Kunzru served as its vice president. The ACI became a full member of Fédération Aéronautique Internationale in 1950. The organization assumed its current name in 1963 by dropping the word "Ltd." from its official name.

Rajiv Gandhi became ACI President in 1984 and held the position until becoming Prime Minister of India in October 1984. The Rajiv Gandhi administration later allotted 30 acres of land near the Safdarjung Airport to the ACI for a period of 30 years at a concessional rate of ₹1 (equivalent to ₹15 or 18¢ US in 2023) per annum. The ACI moved into its new headquarters at Safdarjung Airport in September 1985. After the licence expired in September 2013, the ACI attempted to renew the licence for another 30 years and sent a cheque worth ₹30 (equivalent to ₹51 or 60¢ US in 2023) as a licence fee to the Airports Authority of India (AAI), the current owner of the land. However, the renewal was denied by AAI who instead issued an eviction notice to the ACI. The ACI challenged the eviction in the Delhi High Court. The petition was dismissed by the Court which observed that the facility was being used "more as a marriage/party venue than a flying club", and that "no injustice had been meted out" by evicting the plaintiff.
