= Sri Aurobindo Marg =

Coordinates: 28.570050°N 77.212944°E

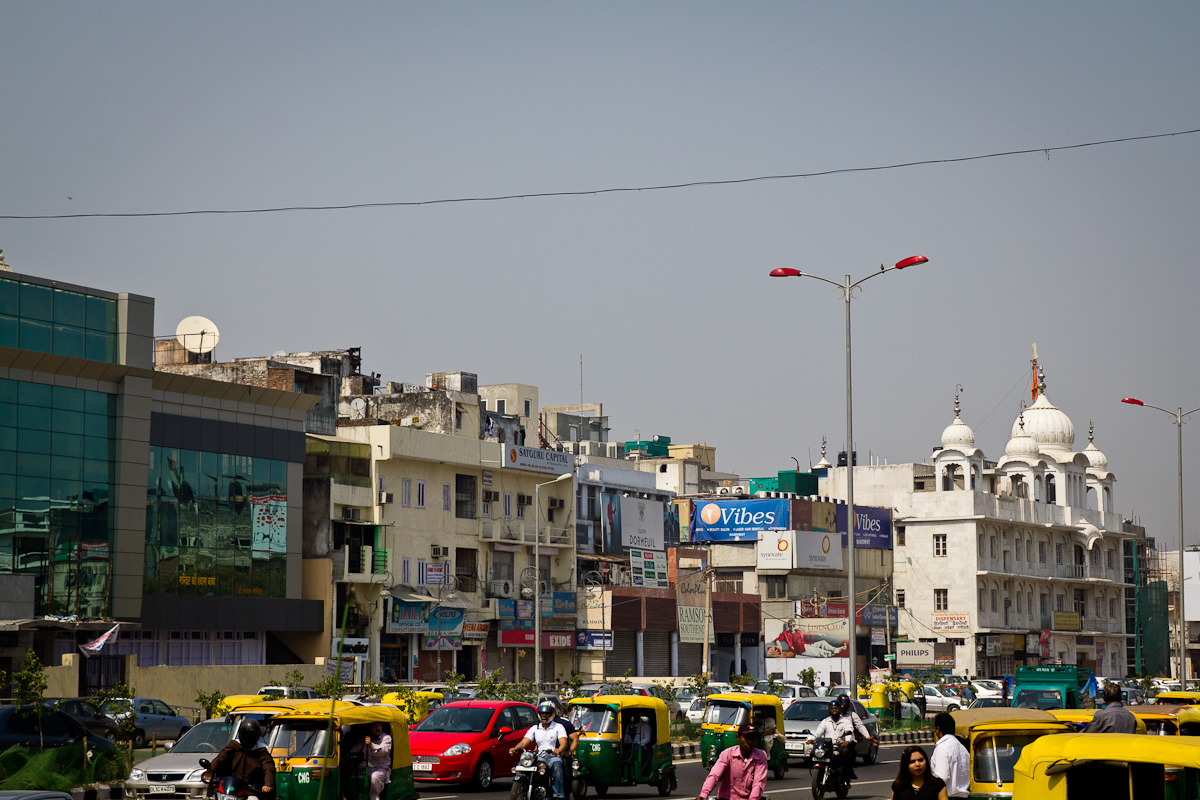
Aurobindo Road near Hauz Khas and Green Park, New Delhi.

Sri Aurobindo Marg or Aurobindo Marg, is an important South Delhi north-south arterial road connecting historic Safdarjung's Tomb to Qutab Minar. The road is named for Sri Aurobindo Ghosh; the Delhi campus of Sri Aurobindo Ashram is located on the road. The road was originally known as Mehrauli Road.

The road is a primary conduit for traffic from North Delhi and Central Delhi, including the commercial hub of Connaught Place, to points south and southwest of Delhi, including Gurgaon. The stations of Delhi Metro, Jor Bagh, INA, AIIMS and Green Park (Yellow Line) lie on this road.

== Major intersections ==
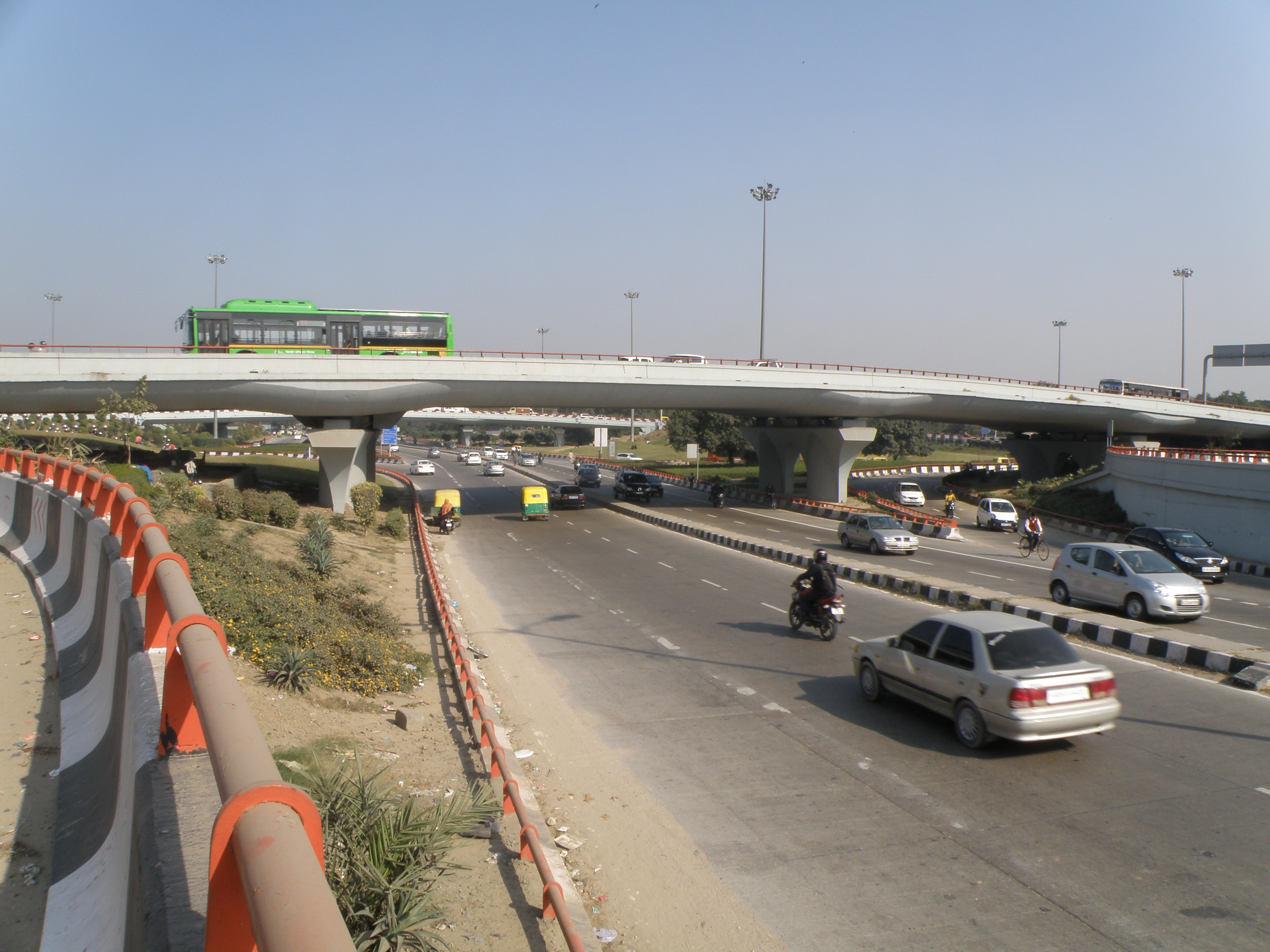
Interchange with Ring Road

The northern terminus of Aurobindo Marg is located at Safdarjung's Tomb. At the southern end, Aurobindo Marg terminates near the Lado Sarai bus terminal.

Major intersections on Aurobindo Marg include, from north to south, include:

- The northern terminus, dividing into Safdarjung Road heading northwest, Tughlaq Road heading directly north, and Prithviraj Road to the northeast.
- Interchange with [(Lodi Road)] to points east (Nizamuddin).
- Interchange with the Ring Road to points east (South Extension) and west (Dhaula Kuan).
- Interchange with the Outer Ring Road to points east (Nehru Place) and west (Munirka).
- Interchange with Press Enclave Marg to points east (Saket).
- The southern terminus, with Anuvrat Marg continuing on the roadway towards Mehrauli, Gurgaon and points southwest of Delhi, and the Mehrauli-Badarpur Road, due west towards National Highway 2.

== Points of interest ==
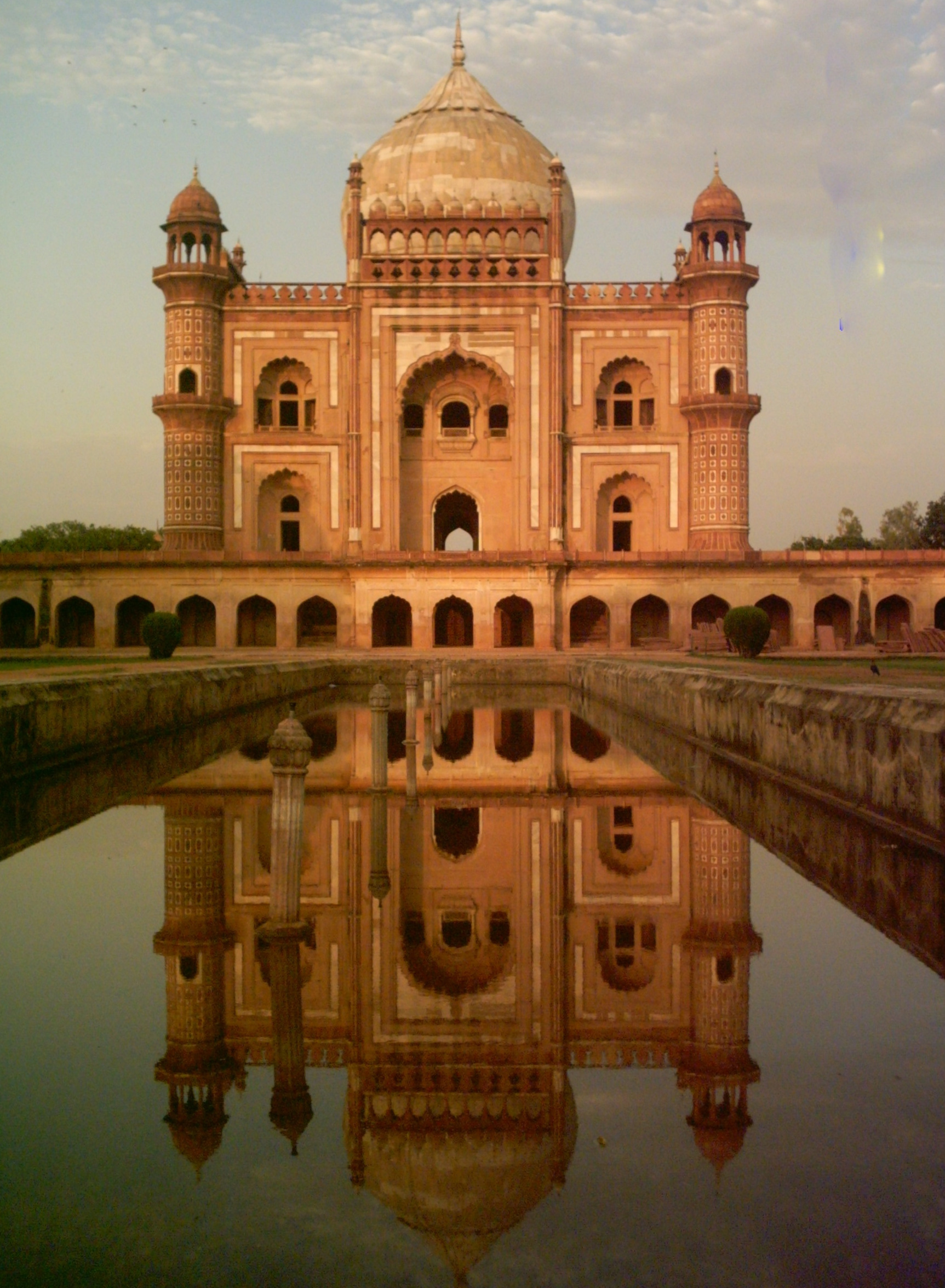
Safdarjung's Tomb

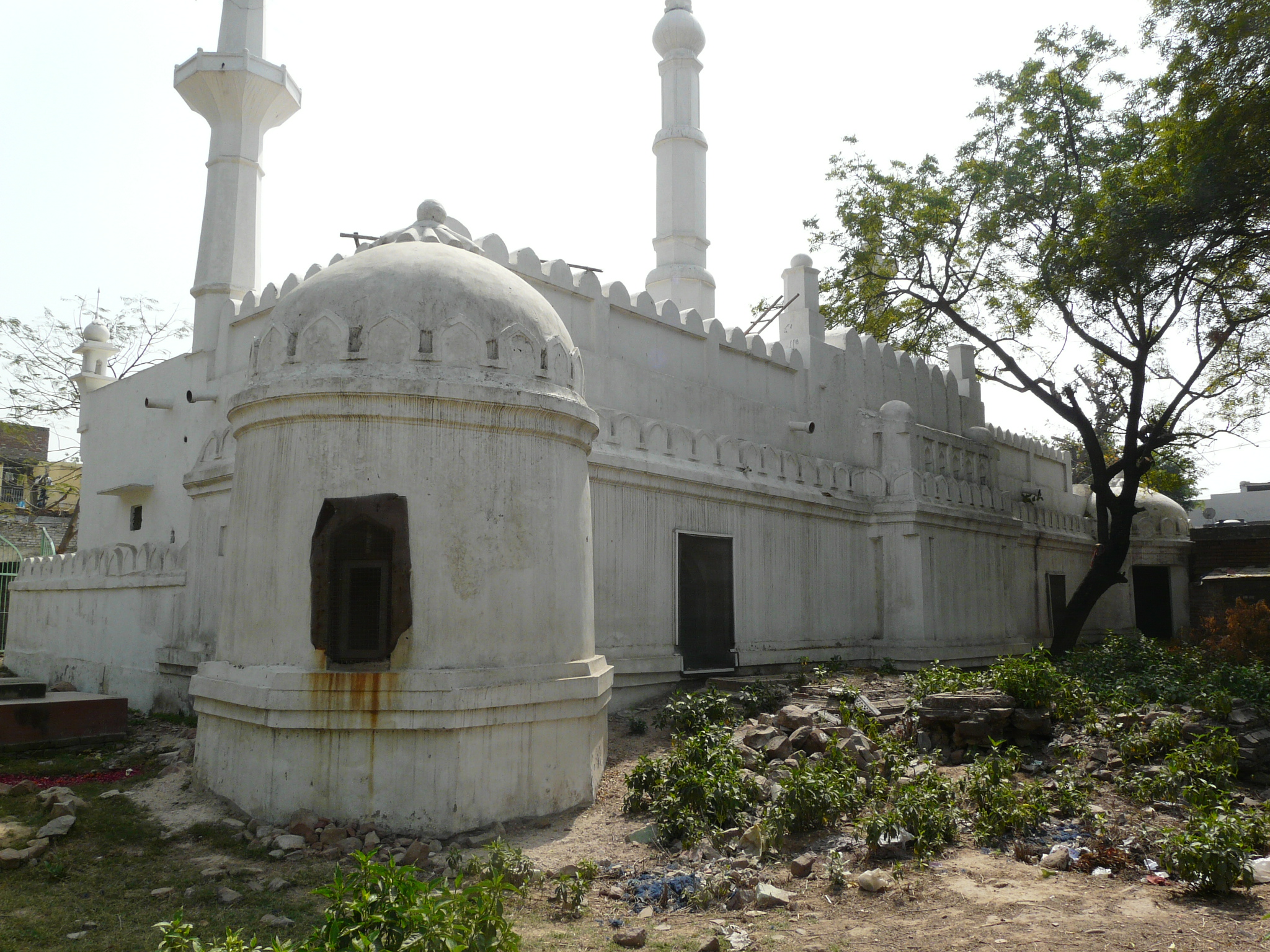
A Lodhi Mosque at Adh Chini

A number of major South Delhi institutions, neighborhoods, and historical monuments are located on or along Aurobindo Marg:

- Safdarjung's Tomb
- Safdarjung Airport, where Rajiv Gandhi Bhawan the corporate headquarters of Airports Authority of India (AAI) is located.
- INA Market
- Dilli Haat
- AIIMS, Safdarjung Hospital
- Dargah Mai Sahiba
- Yusuf Sarai
- Green Park
- National Institute of Fashion Technology*
- Hauz Khas
- IIT Delhi
- Sri Aurobindo Ashram
- IIFT
- Sarvodaya Enclave
- Adchini Village
- Achievers Point
- Lado Sarai Golf Club
- Qutb complex, Mehrauli
- NCERT
- Uday Foundation.
