= Tomb of Safdar Jang =

Sandstone and marble mausoleum in Delhi

Safdarjung Tomb, Delhi
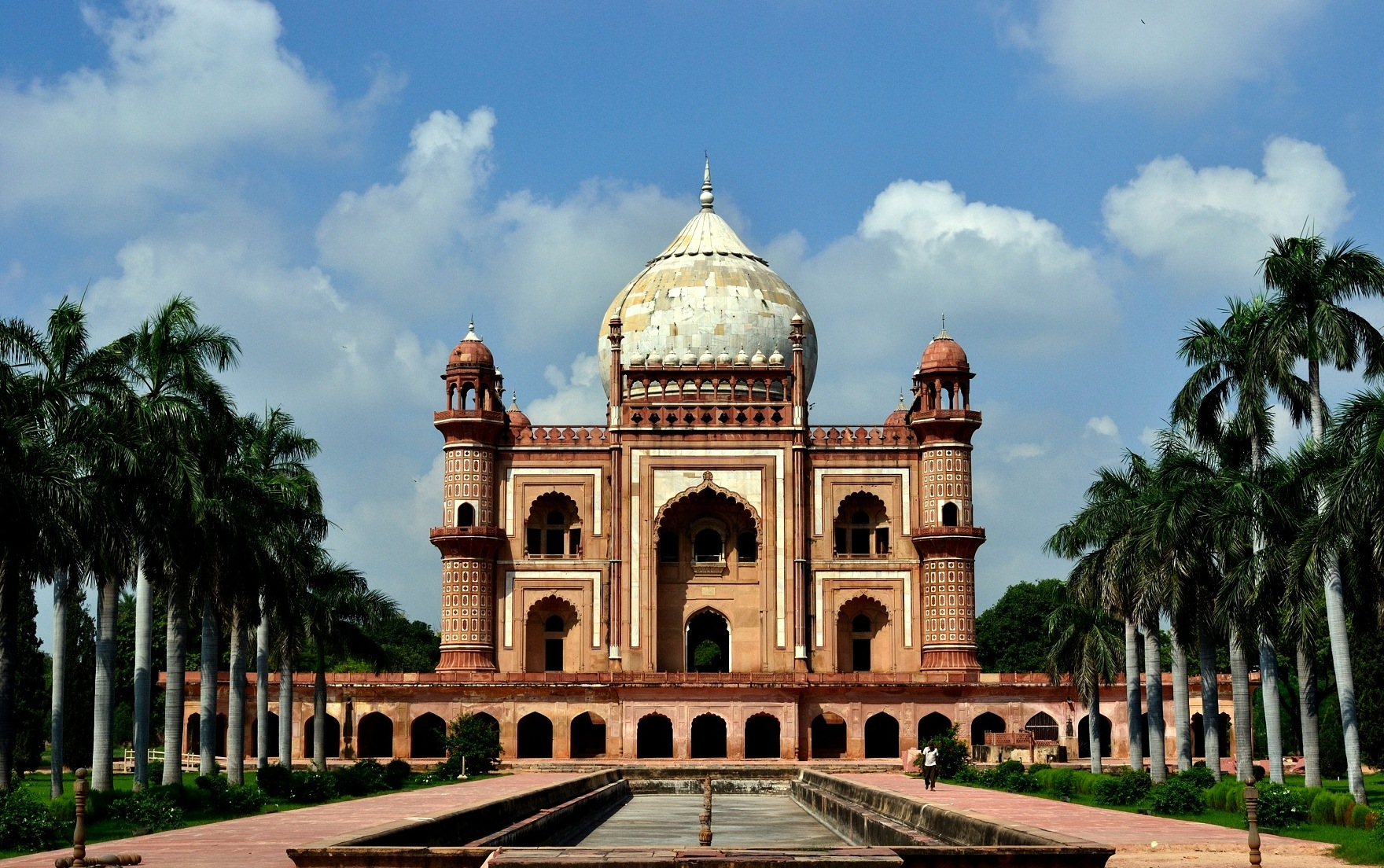
- Front view, September 2012

- Location within Delhi

General information
- Type: Tomb
- Architectural style: Mughal, Indo-Islamic
- Location: New Delhi, India
- Coordinates: 28°35′21″N 77°12′38″E
- Completed: 1754; 272 years ago

The Tomb of Safdar Jang is a sandstone and marble mausoleum in Delhi, India. It was built in 1754 in the late Mughal Empire style for Nawab Safdarjung. Safdarjung, Nawab of Awadh, was made prime minister of the Mughal Empire (Wazir ul-Mamlak-i-Hindustan) when Ahmed Shah Bahadur ascended the throne in 1748.

The tomb, within a garden, is in a late version of the style of earlier Mughal imperial tombs, most famously the Taj Mahal, with inside "eight paradises" (hasht bihisht) or eight rooms around the main chamber under the dome, and a garden divided into four parts outside. This was the first time someone outside the immediate imperial Mughal family built themselves such a tomb and garden complex, reflecting the greatly diminished powers of the emperors by this date.

== Geography ==
The tomb is located near the Safdarjung Airport at the T junction of Lodi Road and Aurobindo Marg (earlier name Mehrauli Road) in New Delhi.

== Background ==
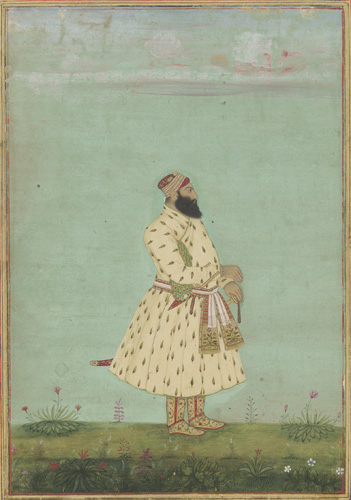
Safdar Jung

The structure was constructed in 1754 in the late Mughal architecture style

Safdar Jang, born Mirza Muqim Abul Mansur Khan, was the second Nawab of Awadh and one of the most powerful nobles during the declining years of the Mughal Empire. Following the death of Emperor Muhammad Shah in 1748, he moved to Delhi. Under the newly crowned Mughal Emperor Ahmad Shah Bahadur, Safdar Jang was appointed as the Prime Minister (Wazir) with the title Vazir ul-Mamalk-i-Hindustan when the Mughal Empire's influence had dwindled to only parts of northern India.

As Wazir, Safdar Jang effectively held considerable power, reducing the emperor to a mere figurehead. His dominance and authoritarian approach, however, earned him strong opposition from rival nobles, including Imad-ul-Mulk and Najib-ud-Daulah, who led a faction against him. Contrary to popular belief, the Marathas were not directly involved in his ousting. After a series of battles, Safdar Jang was forced to leave Delhi in 1753 due to mounting opposition, returning to Awadh where he passed away in 1754.

Following his death, his son Nawab Shuja-ud-Daula sought permission from the Mughal emperor to construct a tomb for his father in Delhi. The tomb, designed by an Abyssinian architect named Bilal Muhammad Khan, was built at a cost of approximately three lakh rupees and remains a significant example of late Mughal architecture.

To the south of this tomb lies the historic site of the battle fought in 1386 between Timur of Mongol and Sultan Mahmud Khan of the Tughluq dynastyin which the latter was defeated.

== Architecture ==
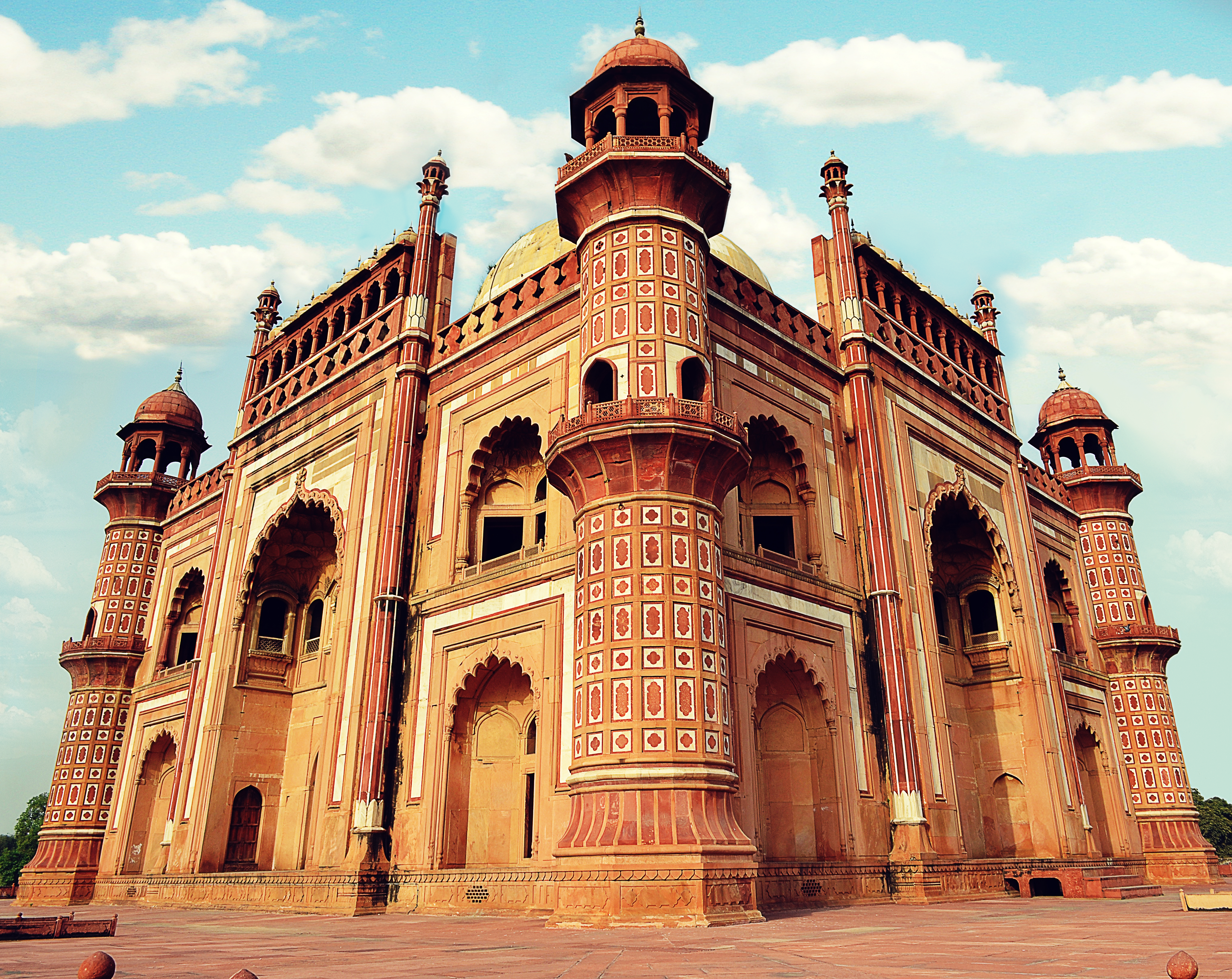
Isometric view of the mausoleum

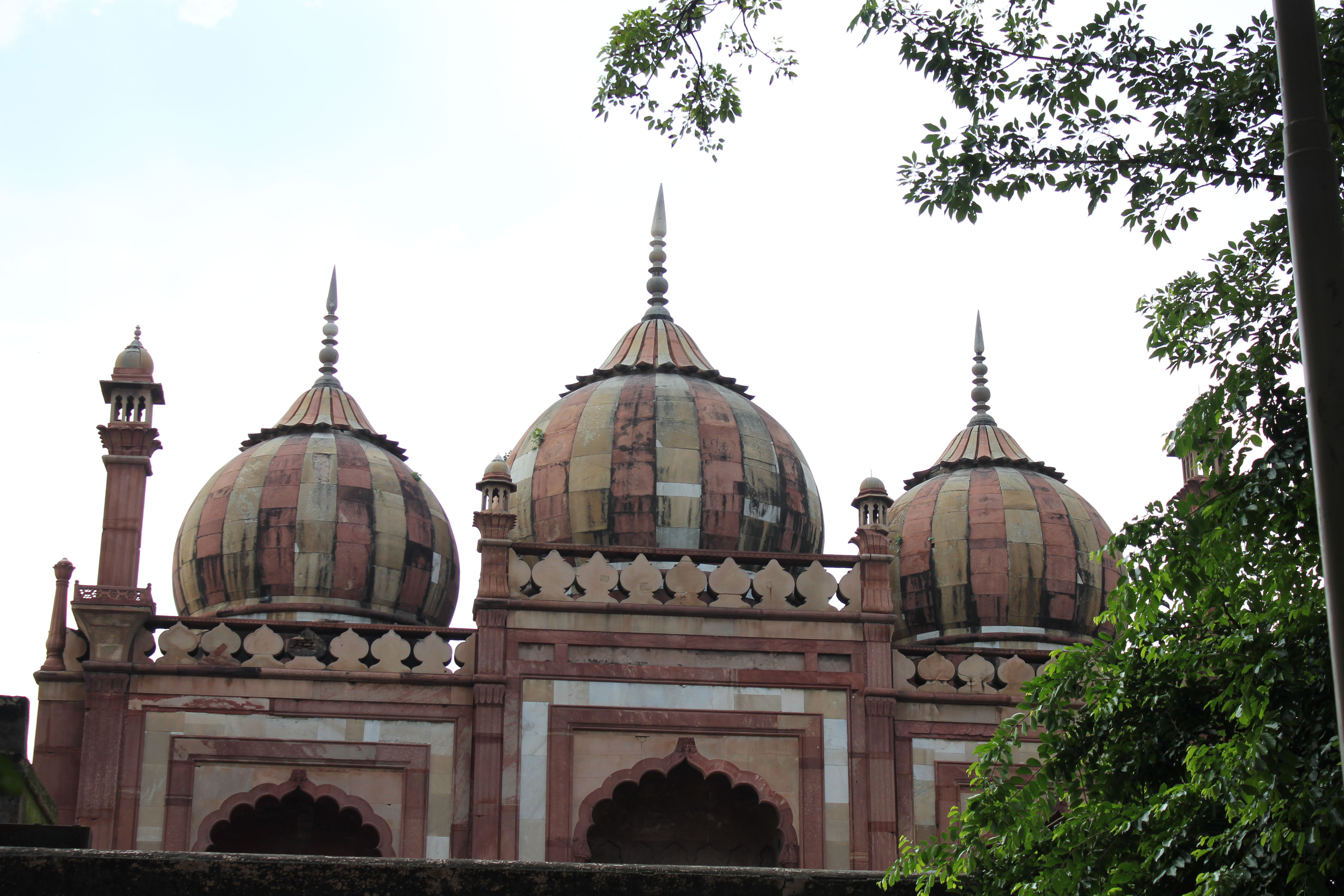
Three-domed mosque within the complex to the right side of the entrance gate

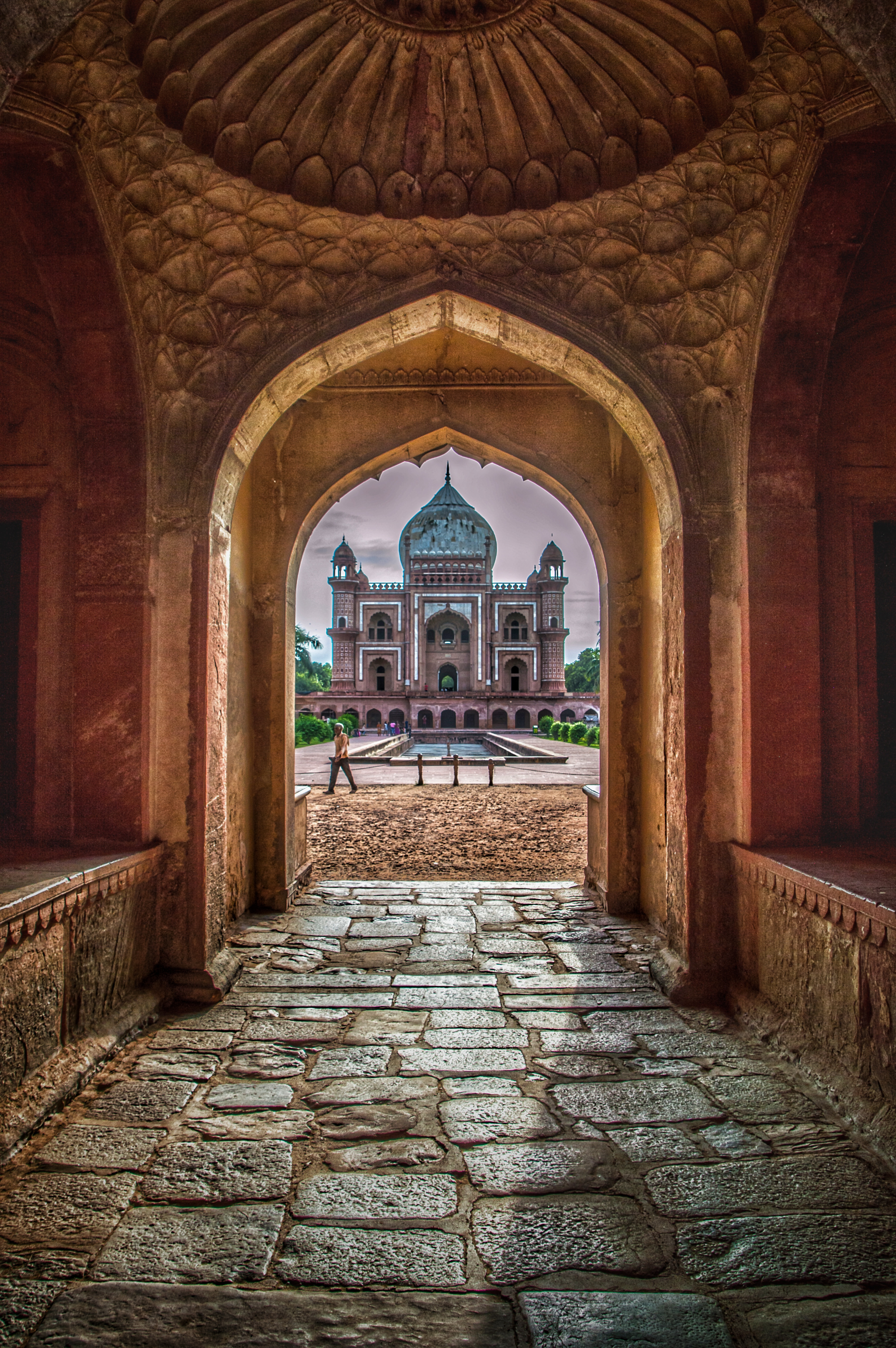
A view of the tomb from the entrance

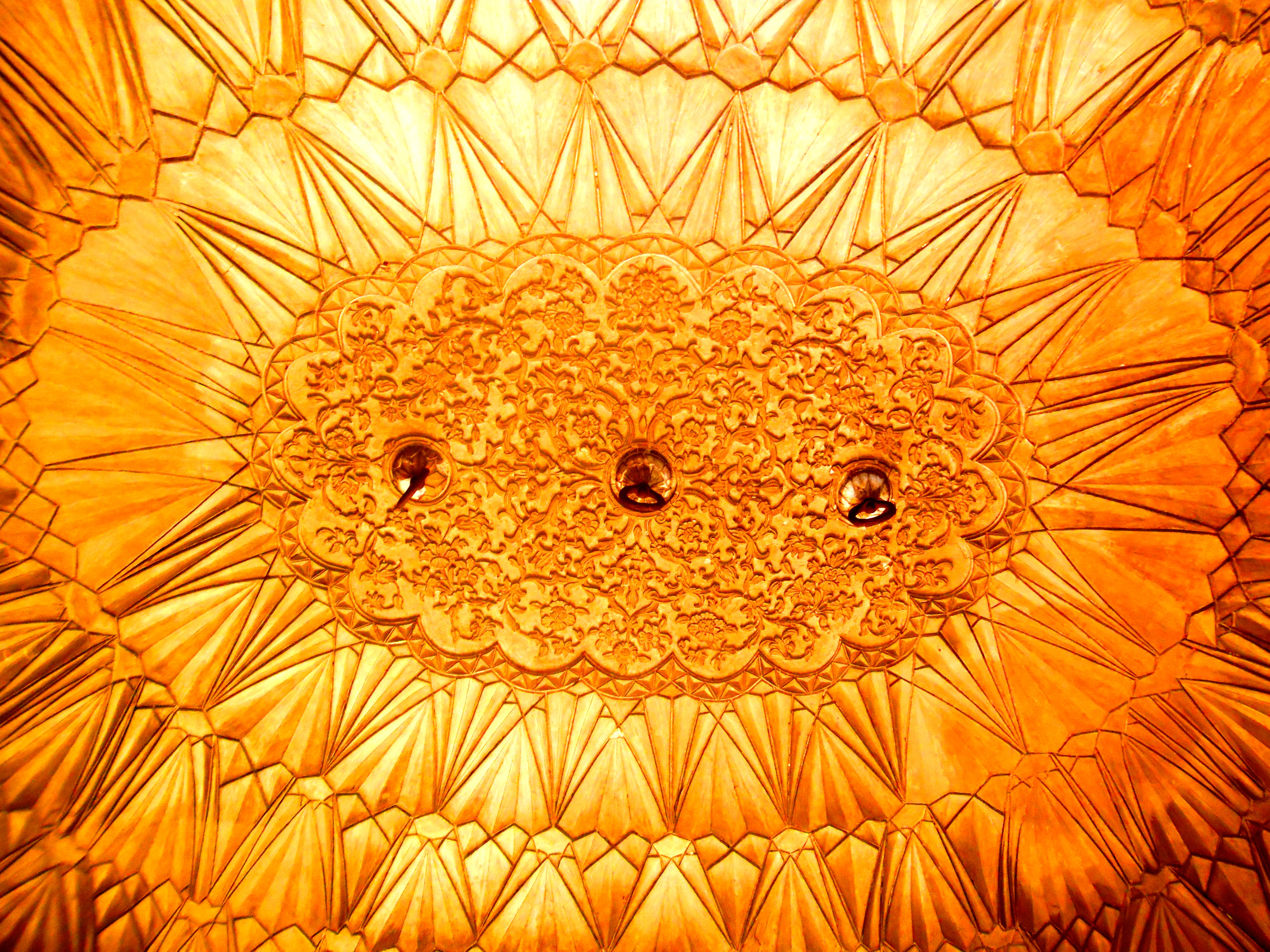
Ceiling at the entrance of the tomb.

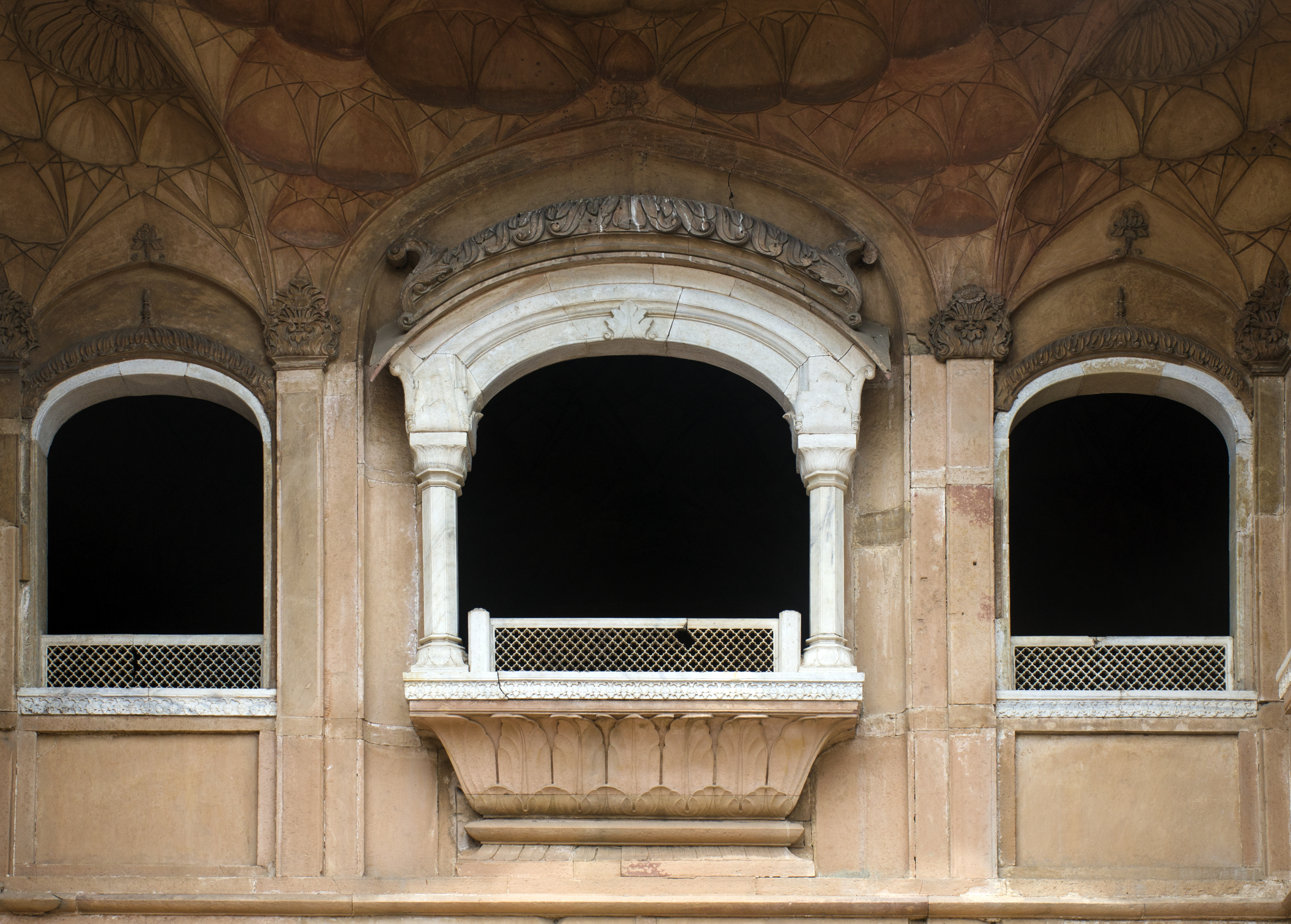
Ornate windows of Safdarjung's Tomb

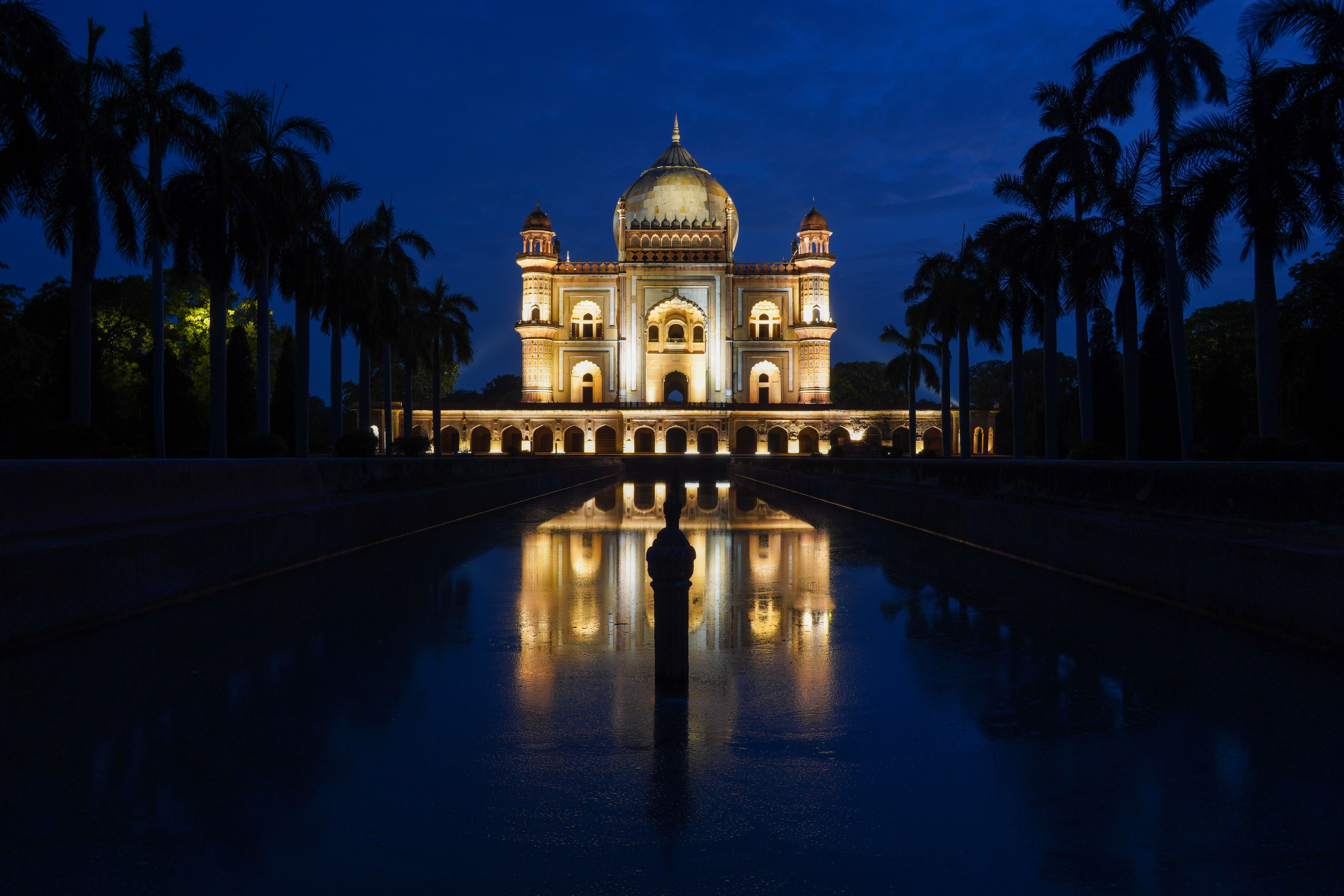
View of the tomb illuminated at night

The Safdarjung tomb, the last monumental tomb garden of the Mughals, was planned and built like an enclosed garden tomb in line with the style of the Humayun tomb and Taj Mahal. It was completed in 1754. The slabs from the tomb of Abdul Rahim Khankhana were used in the construction of the tomb.

The tomb has four key features, which are: The Char Bagh plan with the mausoleum at the center, a ninefold floor plan, a five-part façade, and a large podium with a hidden stairway.

The main entry gate to the tomb is two-storied, and its façade has very elaborate ornamentation over plastered surfaces and is in an ornate purple colour. An Arabic inscription on the surface of the gateway reads: "When the hero of plain bravery departs from the transitory, may he become a resident of God’s paradise". The rear side of the façade, which is seen after entering through the gate, has many rooms and the library. To the right of the gate is the mosque, which is a three-domed structure marked with stripes.

Entering through the main gate gives a perfect view of the mausoleum. Its walls are built high, and the central dome, which is the main mausoleum of Safdarjung, is built over a terrace. Red and buff stones are the materials used for building the main mausoleum, which measures 28 metres (92 ft) square. The central chamber, square in shape, has eight partitions with a cenotaph in the middle. Here, there are partitions in rectangular shape, and the corner partitions are in octagonal shape. The interior of the tomb is covered with rococo plaster with decorations. There are four towers around the main tomb at the corners, which are polygonal in shape and are provided with kiosks. They have marble panels which are faded, and decorated arches. There is an underground chamber in the mausoleum which houses the graves of Safdarjung and his wife. The ceiling of the mosque has been plastered, painted, and ornamented.

The façade, though built in the style of the Taj Mahal, lacks symmetry as the vertical axis has been given prominence, which has resulted in an unbalanced appearance to the tomb. The dome is more elongated; the central part has a taller pishtaq. The four minarets at the four corners are part of the main mausoleum, which was a totally different concept in elevation compared to the Taj Mahal, where the towers are detached and away from the facade of the tomb.

The architecture of the tomb is praised and also derided; it is derided for the lack of proportioning of its various units and use of poor material for construction. Reginald Heber, who was Bishop of Calcutta between 1823 and 1826, based on the light brown colour of the stone used, had observed that the tomb has the "colour of potted meat". Even ASI has observed that the marble used for ornamentation in the towers though pleasing is "rather florid". Another observation is that the tomb can not be compared to the Taj Mahal or the Humayun Tomb, as, at the time it was built, the Mughal Empire was on the decline and sandstone had to be used and lines were set improperly and the quality appeared "thread bare".

== Garden ==
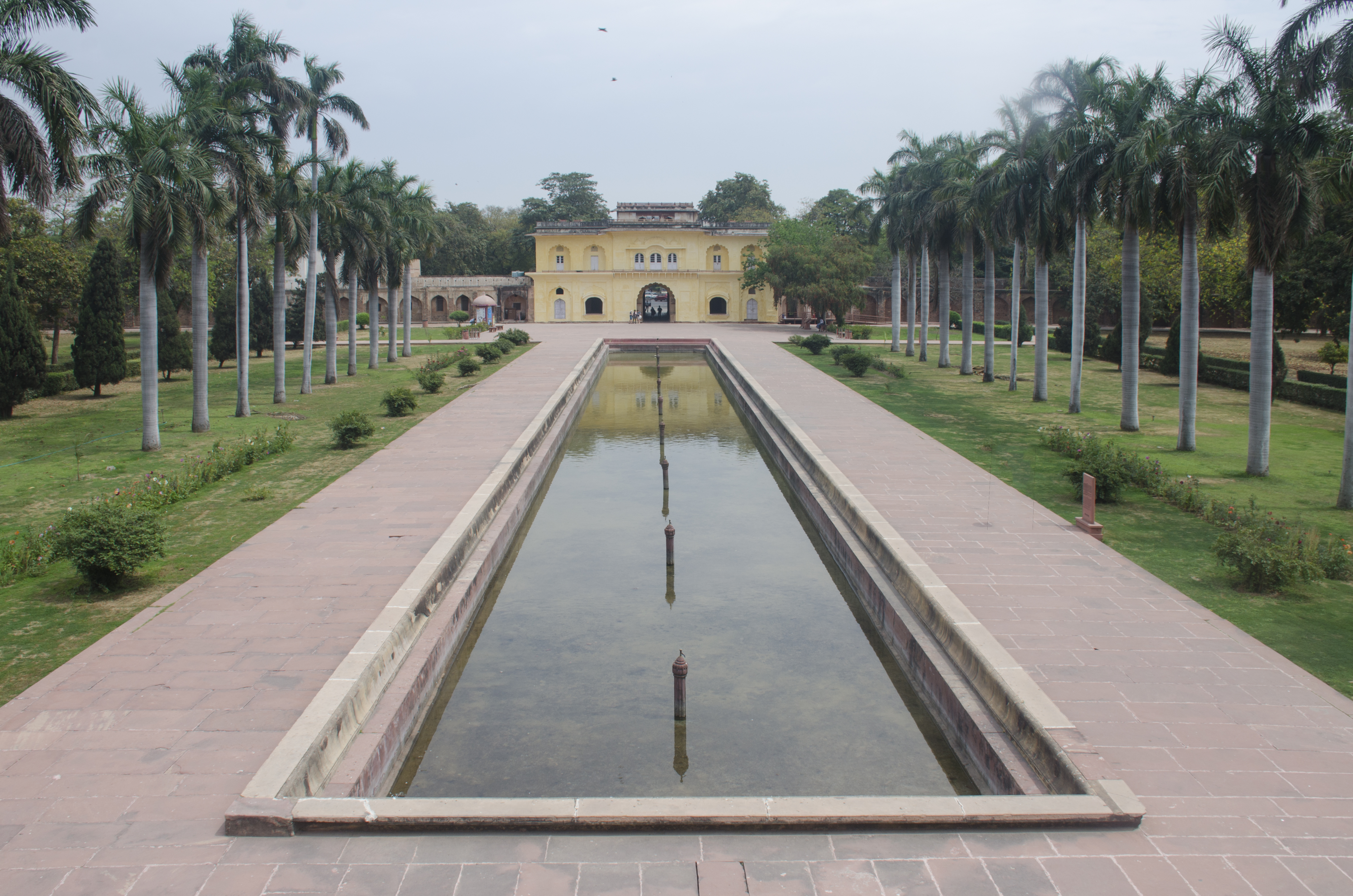
Garden of Safdarjung's Tomb complex

The large square garden surrounding the tomb is surrounded by a wall that is approximately 280 metres (920 ft) long on each side. The layout is in the form of four squares with wide footpaths and water tanks, which have been further subdivided into smaller squares. The garden is in the Mughal charbagh garden style, and is a smaller version of the garden of the Humayun Tomb, which is also built in Delhi. One channel leads to the entrance gate and the other leads to the three pavilions. The main podium over which the mausoleum is built measures 50 metres (160 ft) on each side. The high walls have been built in rubble stone masonry and have recessed arches in the interior. The towers or chatris are octagonal in shape. Its overall layout consists of four pavilions, which have multiple chambers, and the entrance gateway to the east is impressive. On the eastern side adjoining the gate are many apartments and a mosque, and a courtyard. The pavilions are laid out in the western, northern and southern directions and are named Jangli Mahal (palace in the forest), Moti Mahal (pearl palace) and Badshah Pasand (King's favorite) respectively. Nawab's family used to reside in these pavilions. Now the entire monument is under the control of the Archaeological Survey of India (ASI), which has its offices in the pavilions and also a library over the main gate.

== Recent times ==
On 21 August 2012, the then Health Minister of India, Ghulam Nabi Azad offered Eid prayers in a mosque in the complex. However, under the law of the Archaeological Survey of India (ASI), "prayers at centrally protected monuments are not allowed unless the practice was prevalent at the time when it was notified as protected", and it is one of the 174 protected monuments of ASI in Delhi. Earlier also, Indian vice president Hamid Ansari "planned to offer Eid prayers" at the tomb but was cancelled at the "eleventh hour".

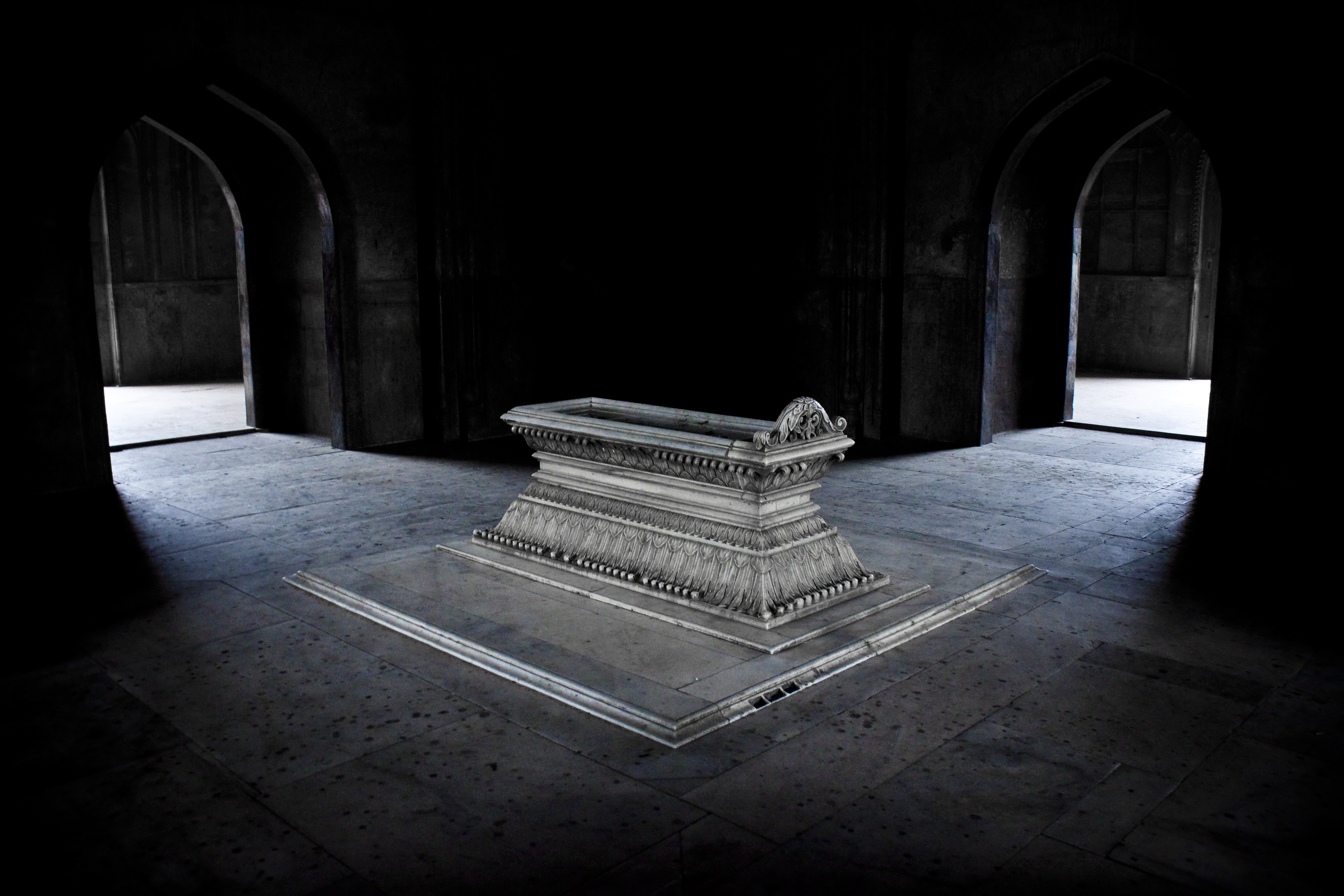
Tomb of Safdarjung

The tomb has four fountains on each of the four sides. In December 2013, it was reported that a plan was going on for "activating the fountains" as officials believed that they "were in working condition". But "in recent excavation", ASI unearthed a drainage system adjacent to the fountain. The system would "help them restart these". Though there are four fountains, but according to ASI, only one, which is opposite to the main entrance would be made "functional".

In July 2019, a new architectural lighting system comprising 213 LED lights was inaugurated at the tomb. An earlier illumination scheme introduced for the 2010 Commonwealth Games had been discontinued because of a lack of staff to maintain late opening hours.

In June 2014, the ASI shifted their office from the tomb to General Pool Offices near the Indian National Army Colony. In November of the same year new visitor boards were installed in the tomb to "promote the lesser known but striking monuments in the city [referring to Delhi]".

The 2013 Hollywood film, Jobs, was shot in the tomb.

== See also ==
- Lal Bangla in Delhi, another example of later Mughal architecture
- Tomb of Asif Khan in Lahore

== Gallery ==
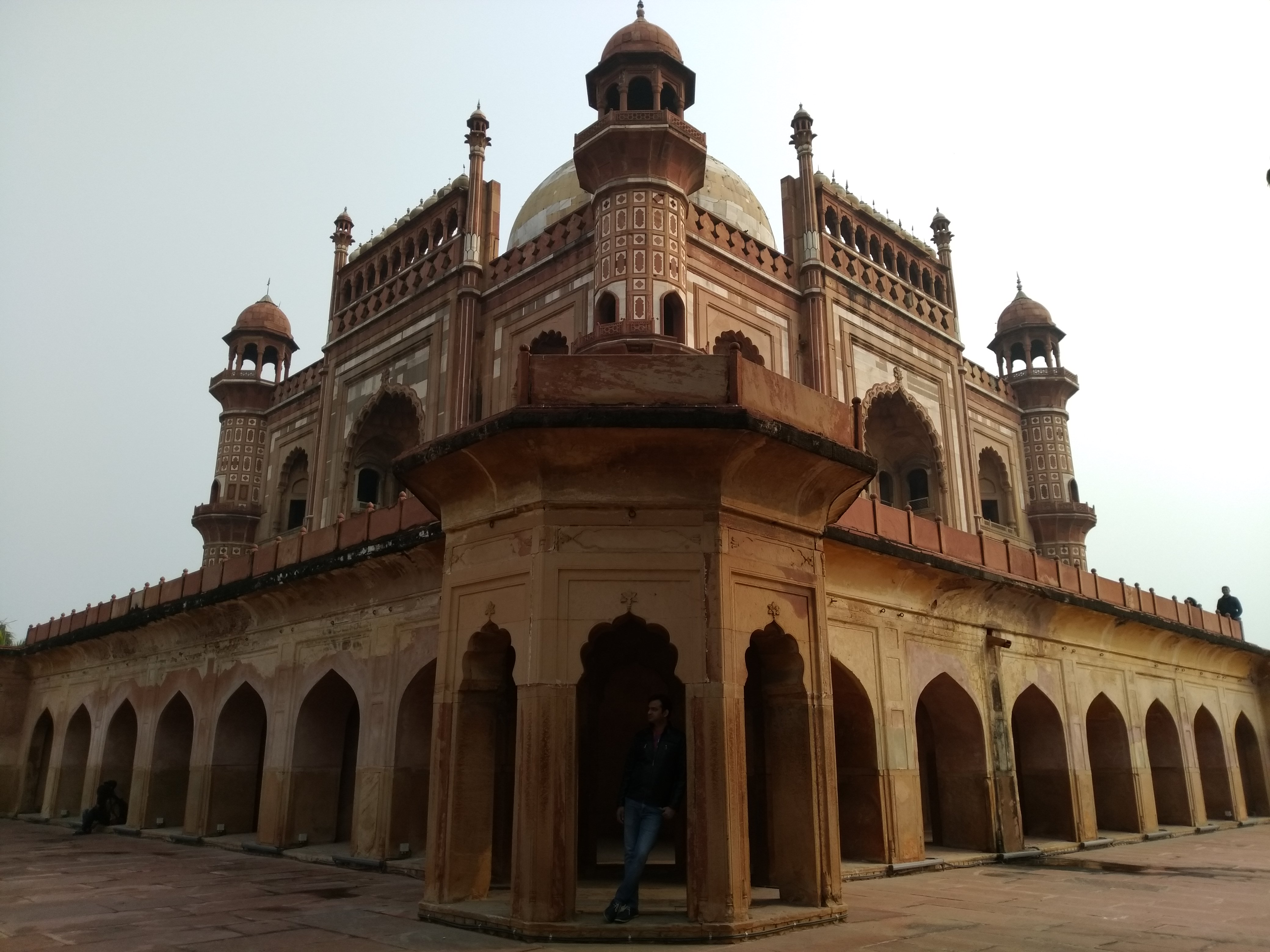
Safdarjung's Tomb triangle view

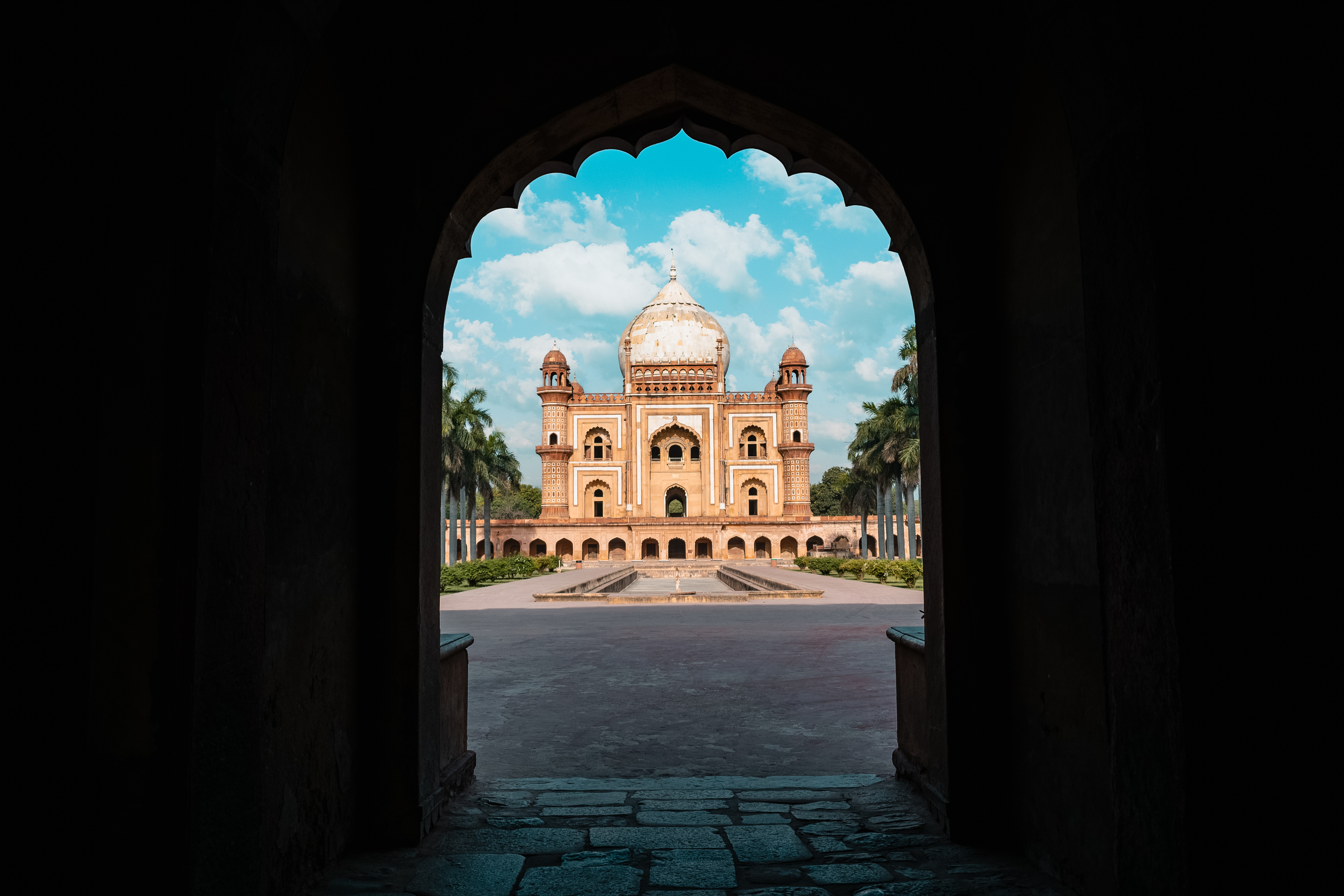
View of Safdarjung's Tomb from Front Entrance

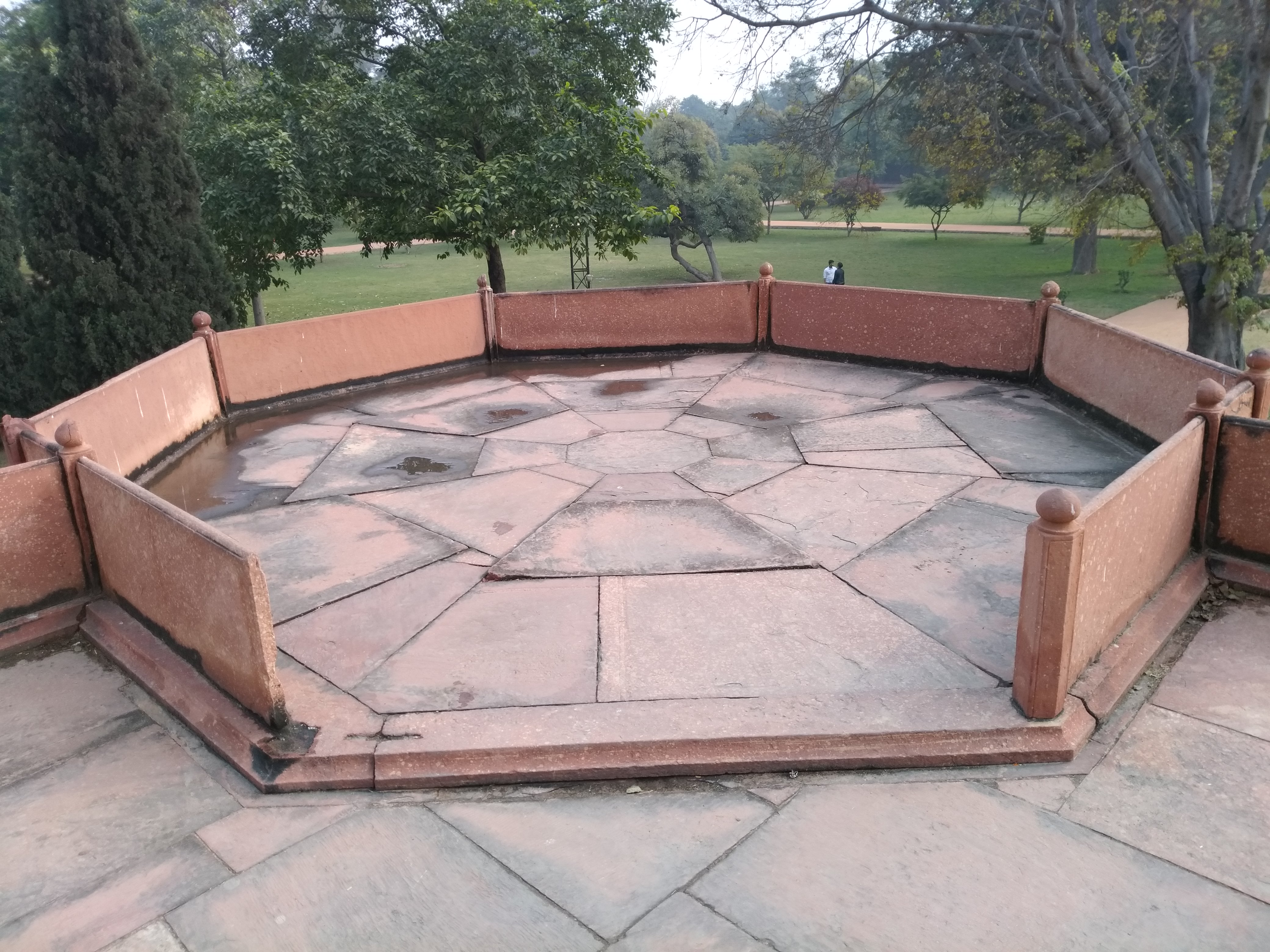
Octagonal space on the left side of tomb

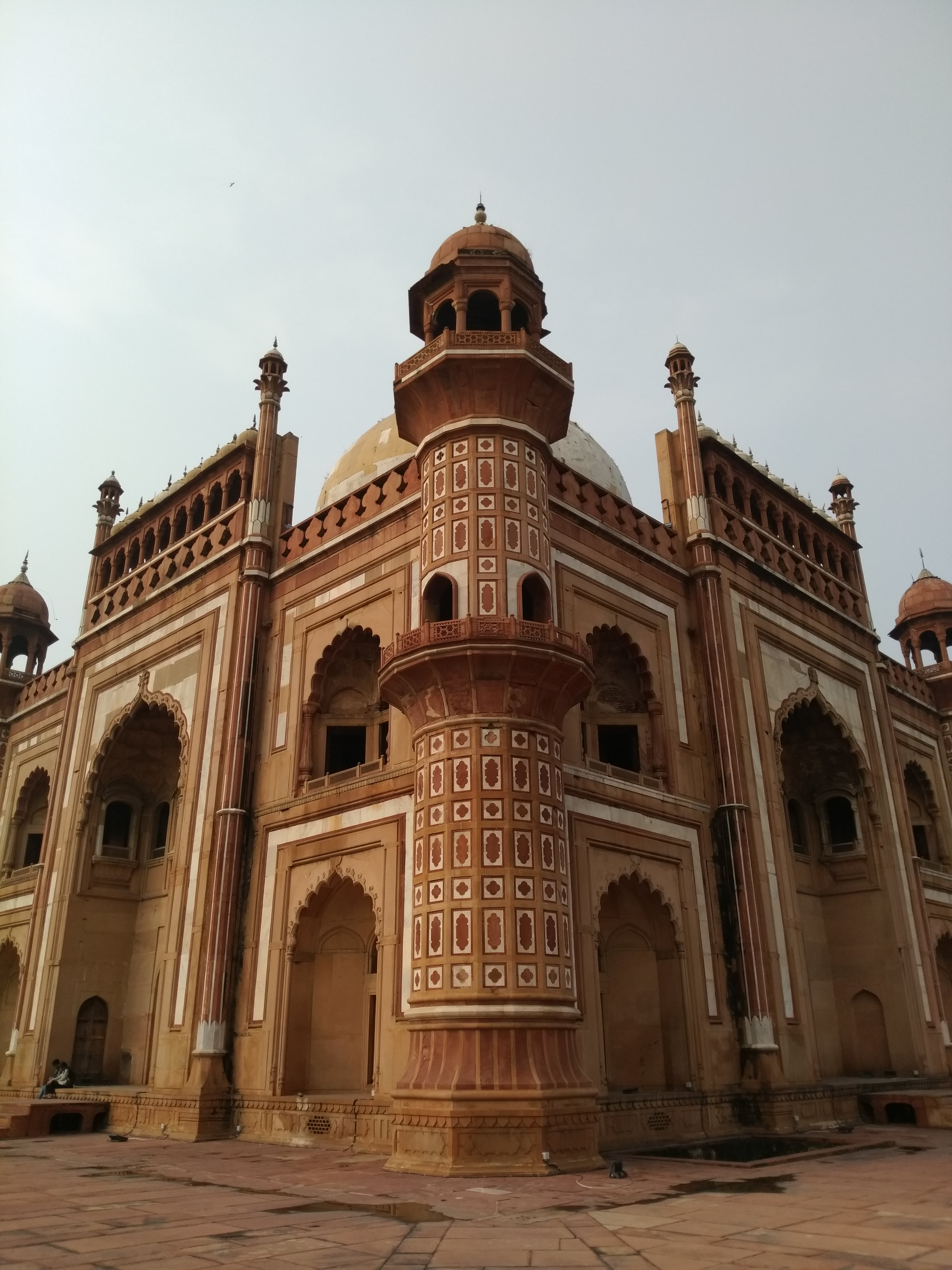
Minaret

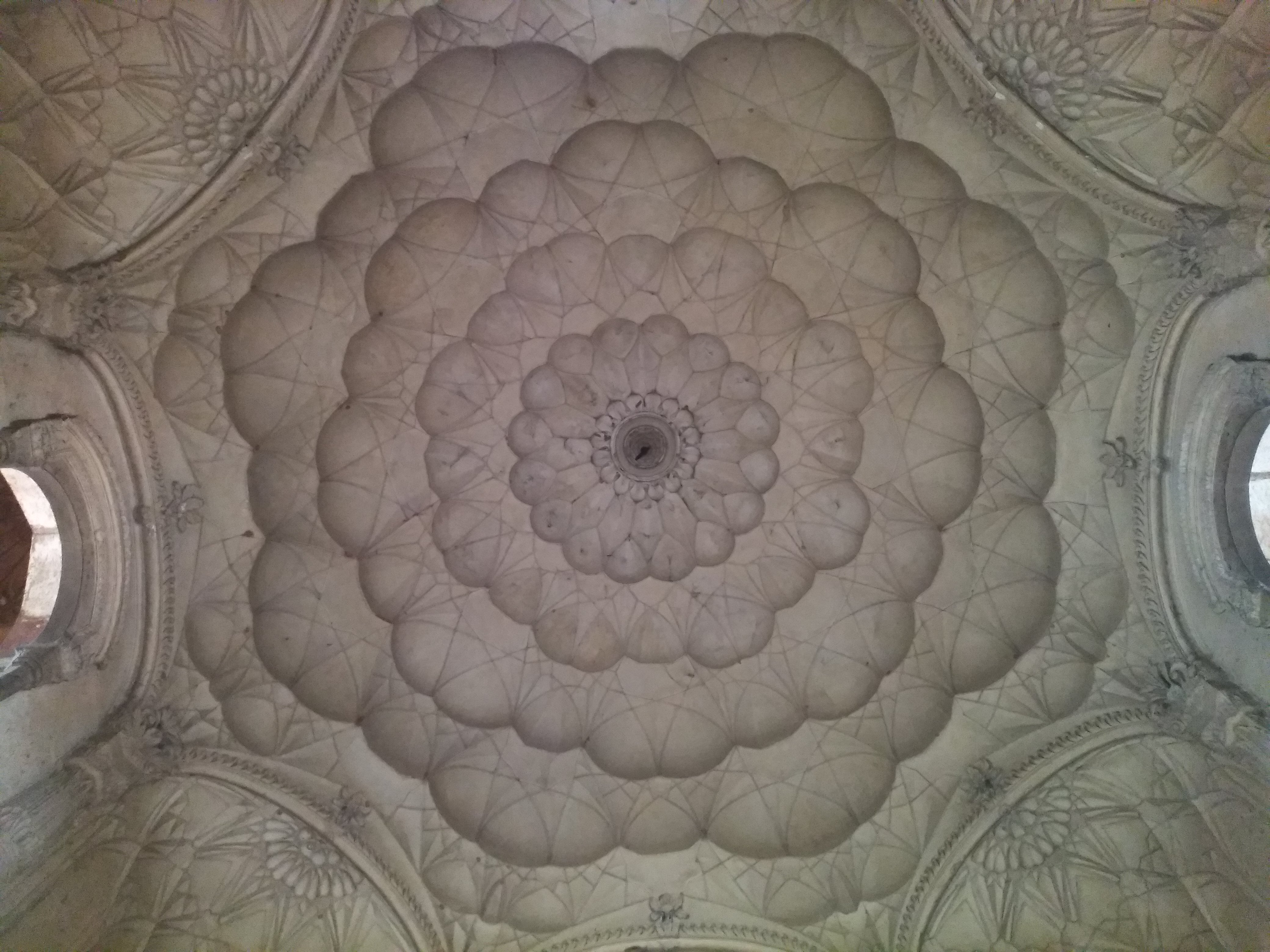
Ceiling art

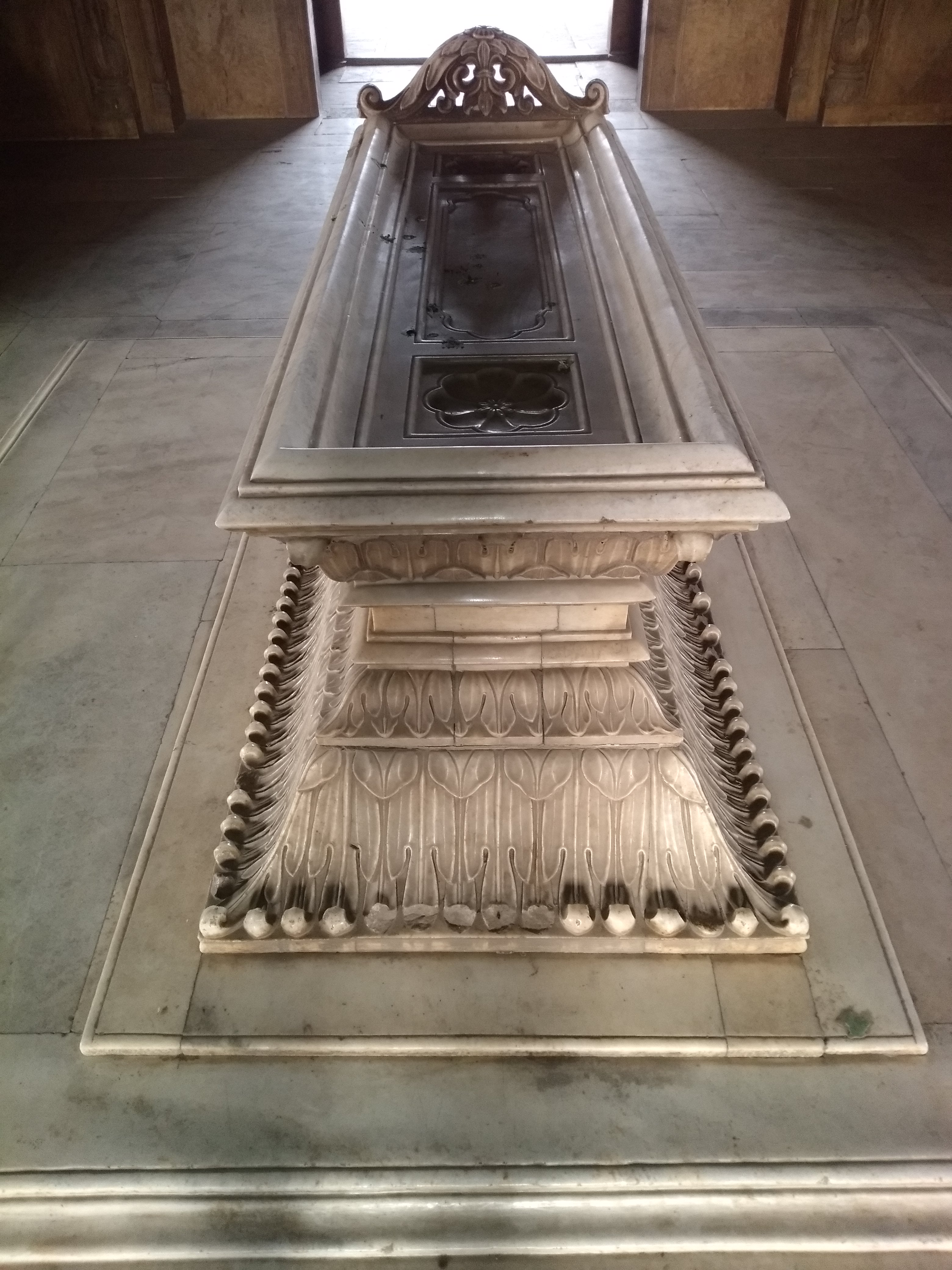
Grave of Safdarjung

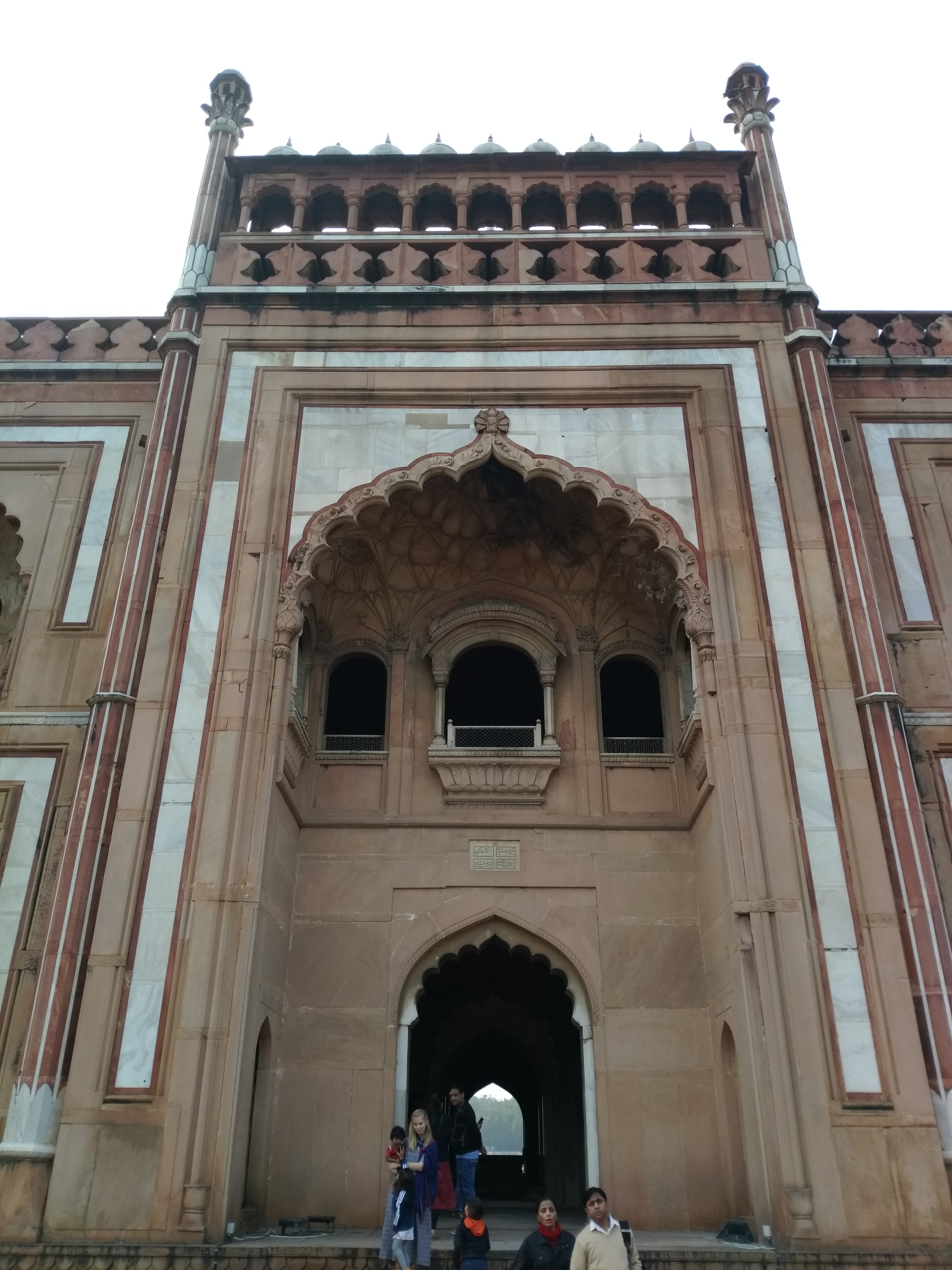
Entrance of main building

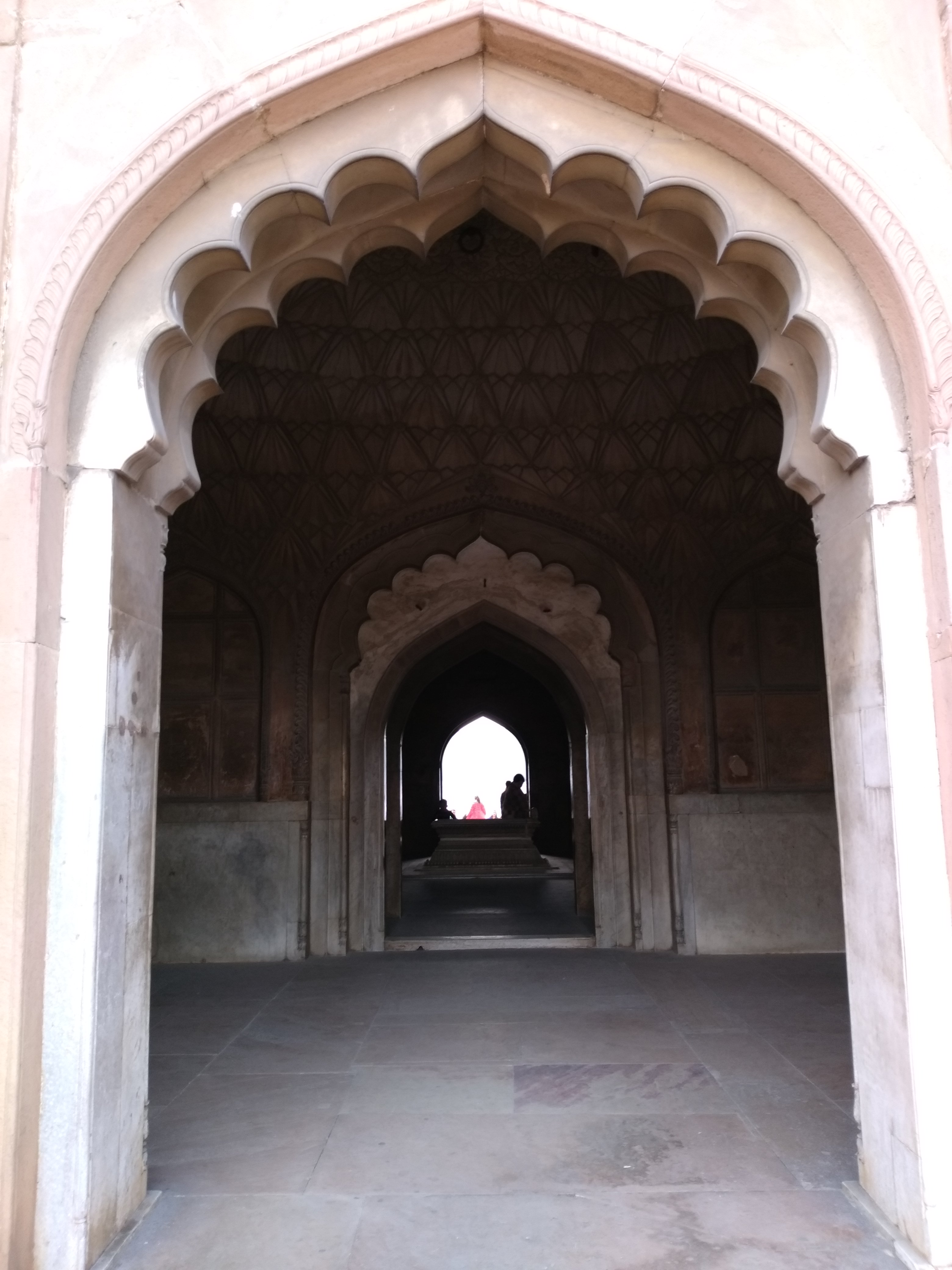

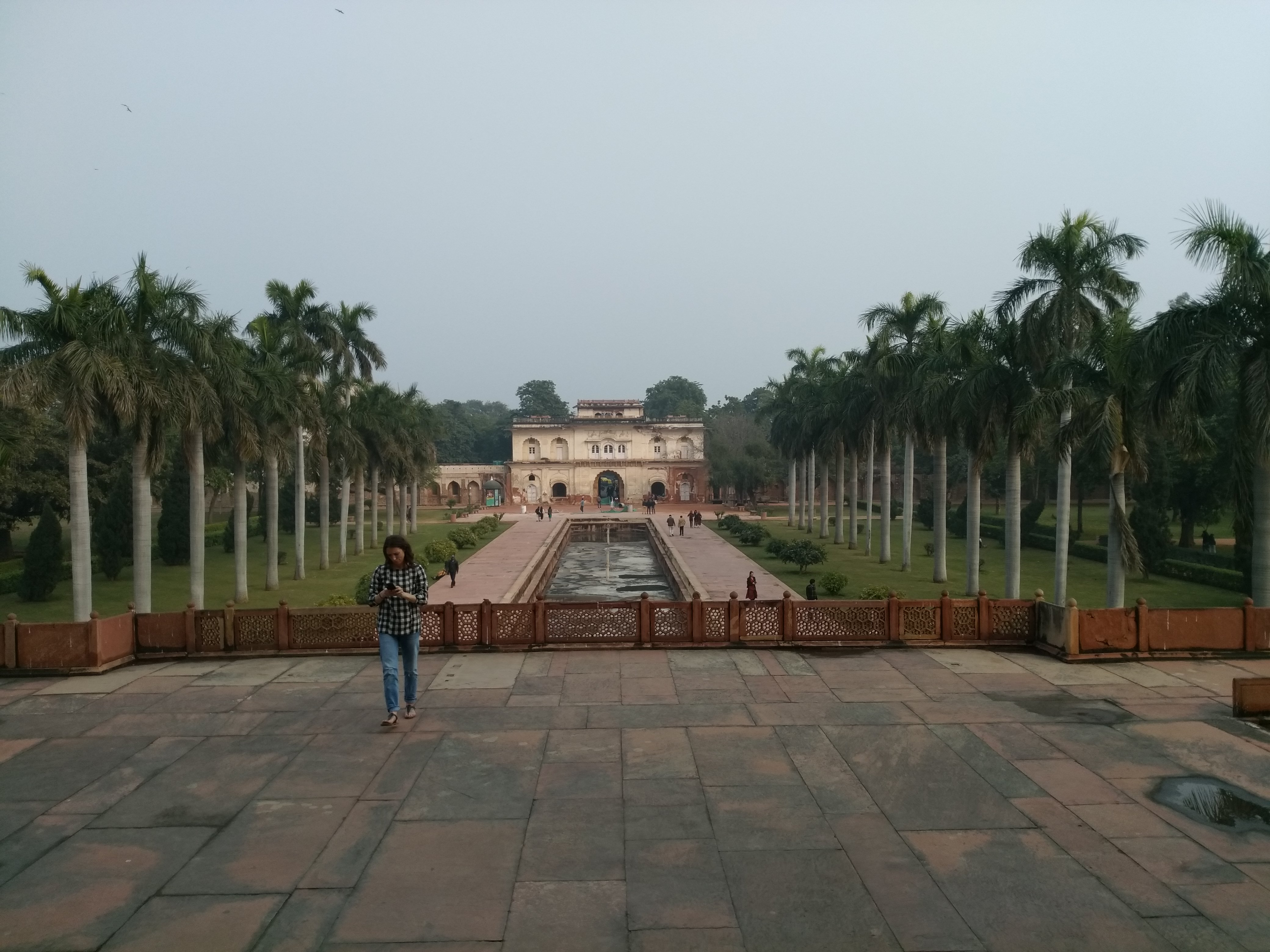
Garden

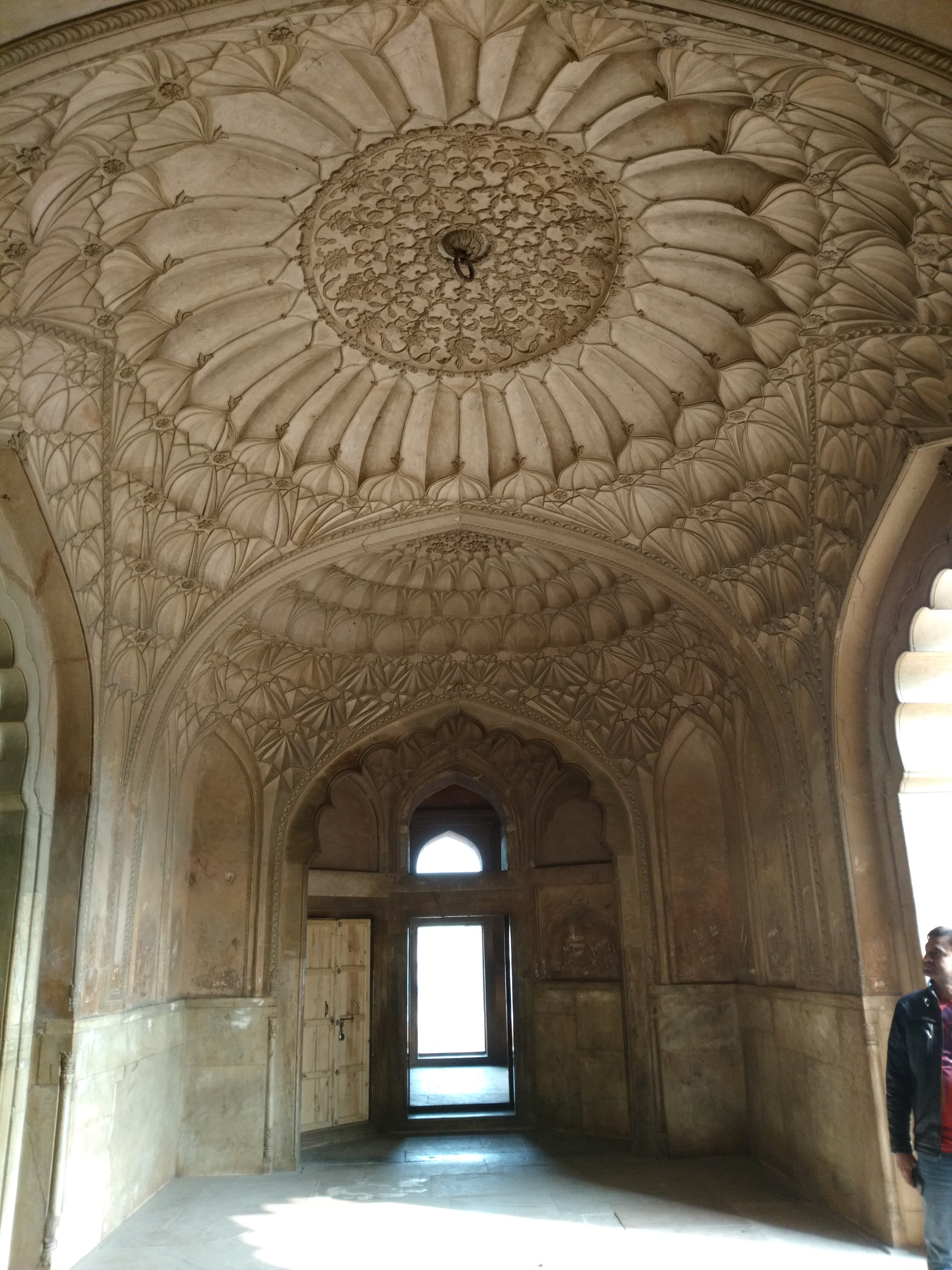
Interior inside the tomb

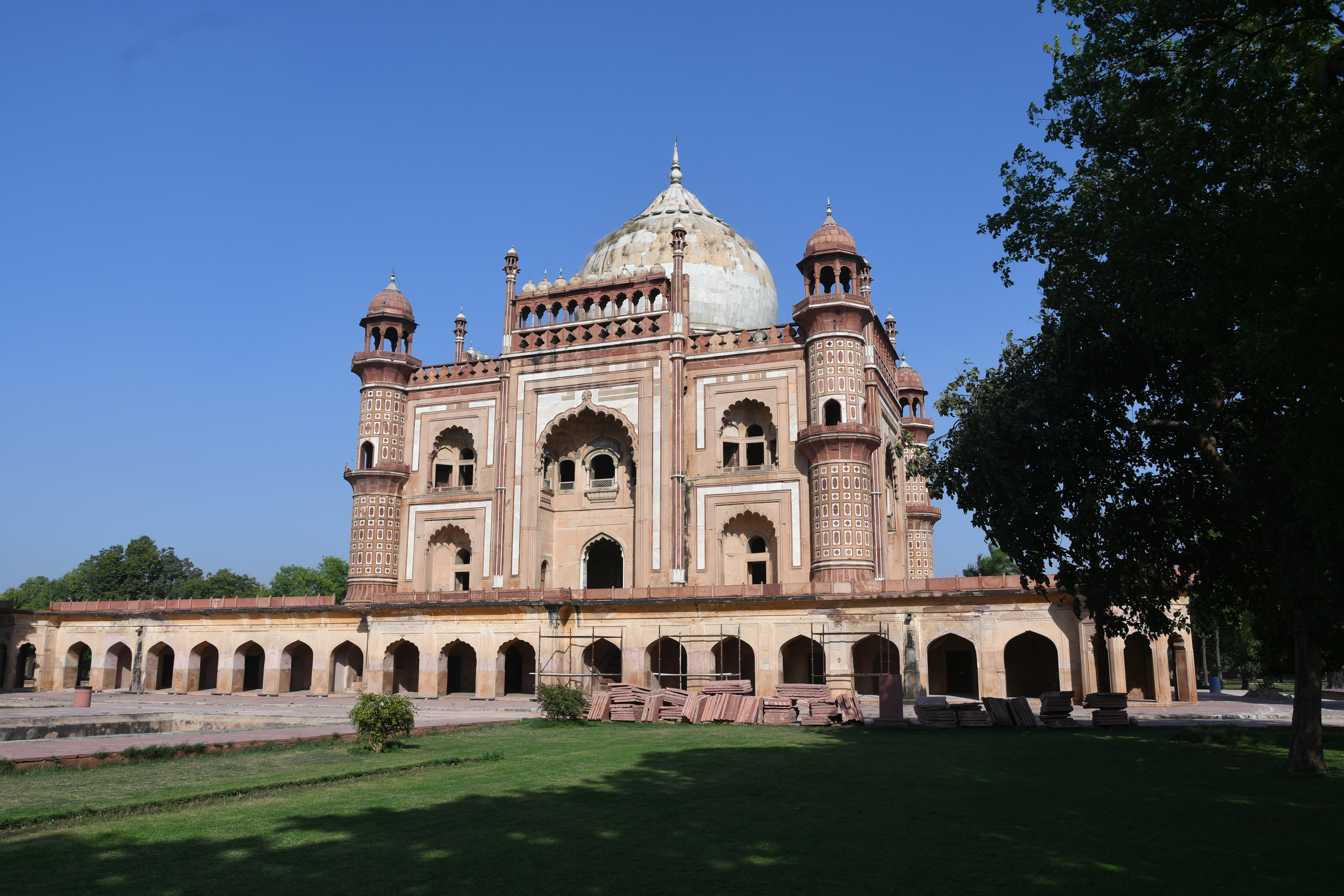

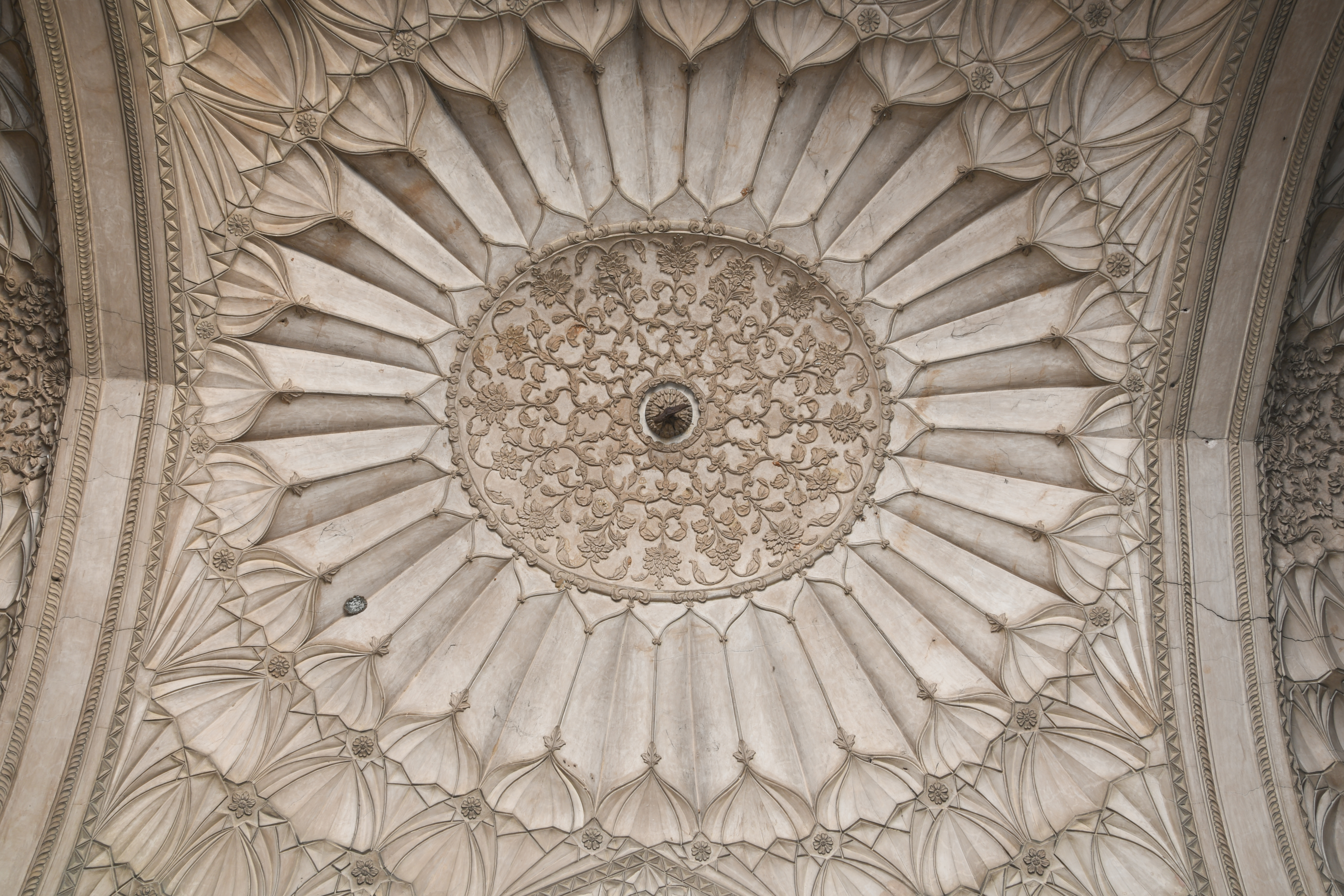
Ceiling art

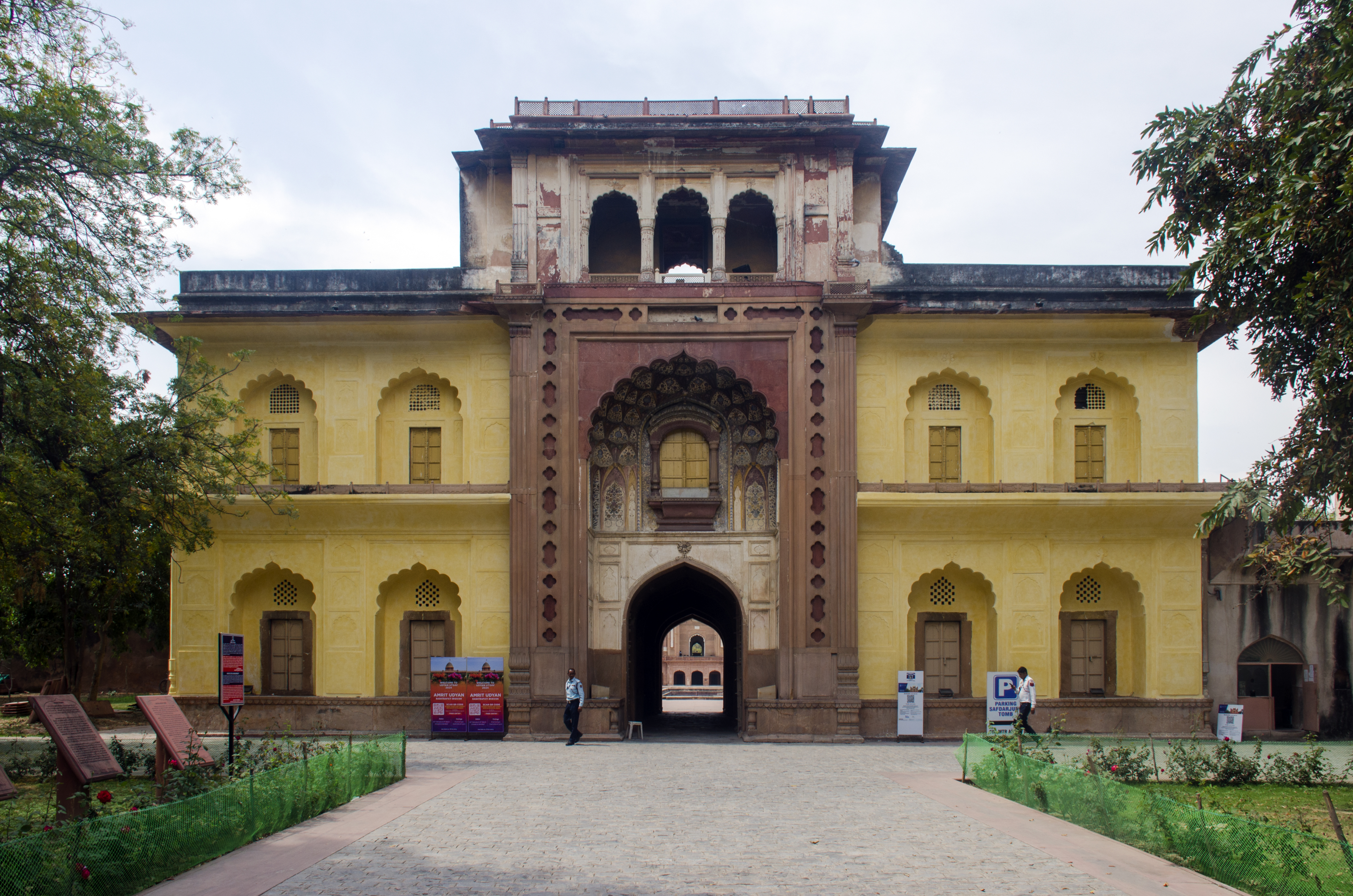
Main entrance of Safdarjung's Tomb complex

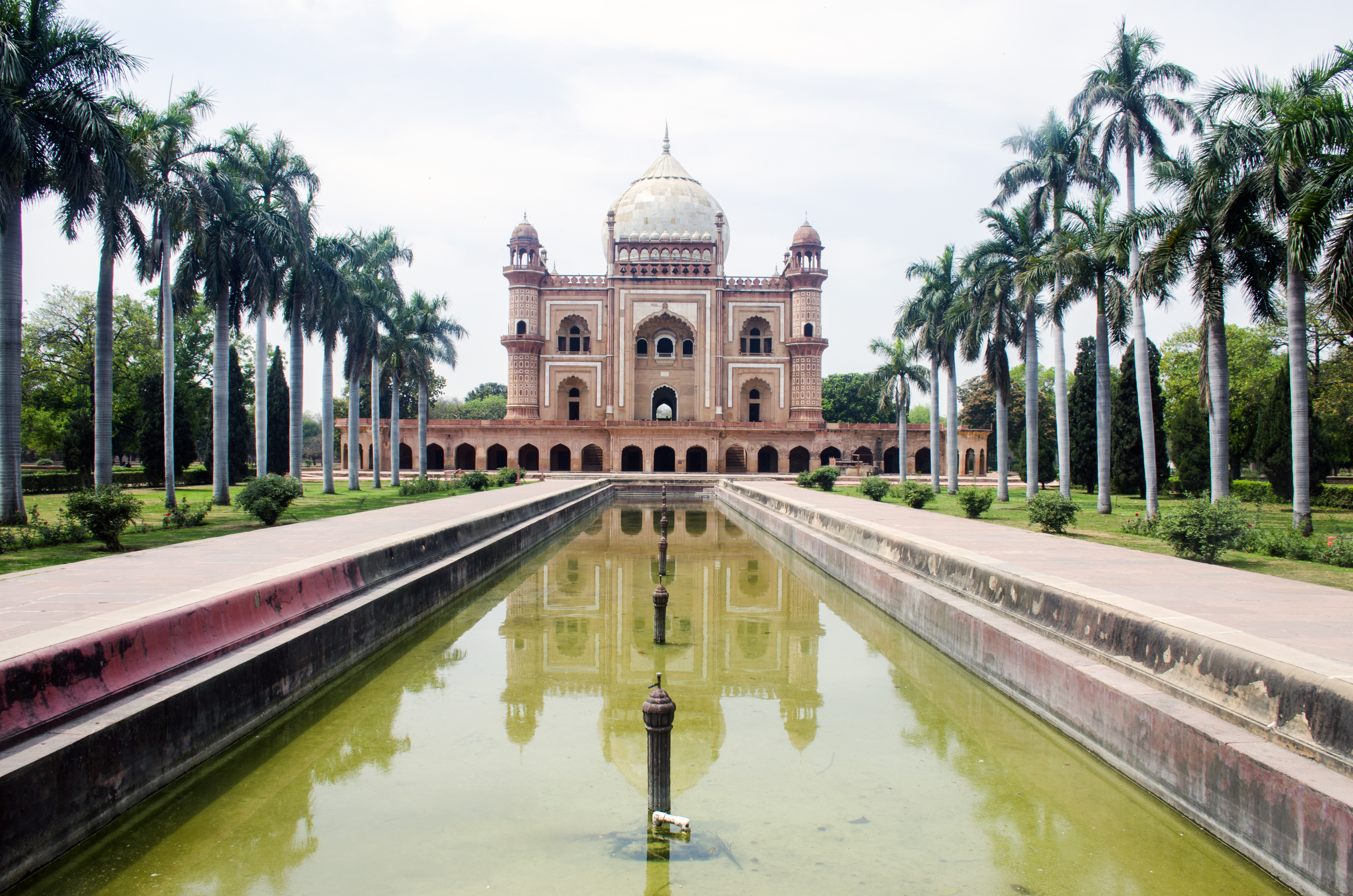
Reflection of Safdarjung's Tomb complex

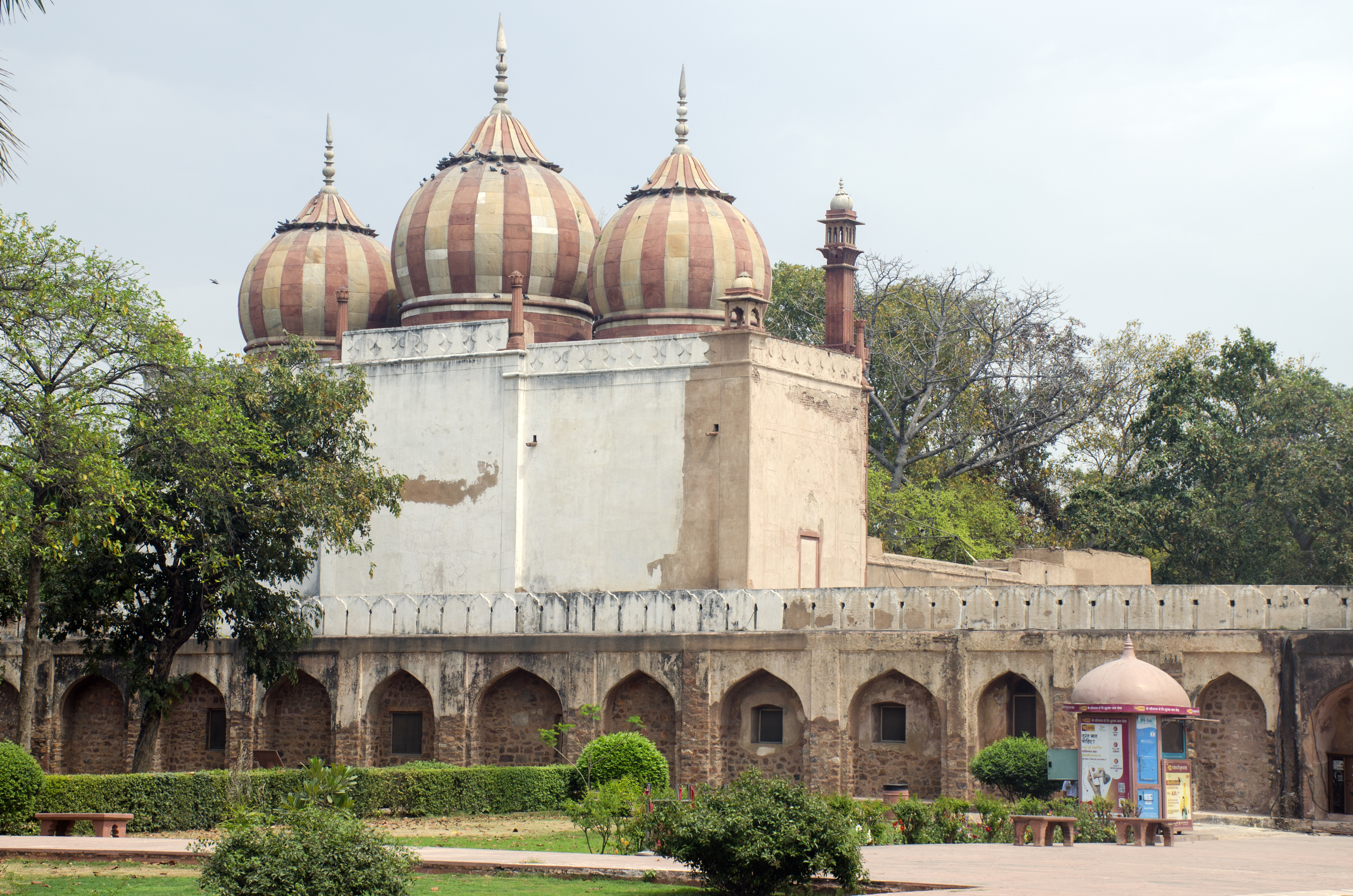
Mosque inside the Safdarjung's Tomb complex

== Bibliography ==
- Batra, Ravi (1 January 2012). The Splendour of Lodi Road: My Brush with Heritage. TERI Press. ISBN 978-81-7993-446-3.
- Raezer, David; Raezer, Jennifer (5 August 2011). Mughal Architecture in India: Guide to Delhi and Agra, Approach Guides. Approach Guides. ISBN 978-1-936614-25-7.
- Vassanji, M.G. (18 March 2009). A Place Within: Rediscovering India. Doubleday Canada. ISBN 978-0-307-37177-5.
- Brown, Rebecca M.; Hutton, Deborah S. (27 April 2011). A Companion to Asian Art and Architecture. John Wiley & Sons. ISBN 978-1-4443-9632-4.
- Dalrymple, William (25 March 2003). City of Djinns: A Year in Delhi. Penguin Group US. ISBN 978-1-101-12701-8.
