= Safdarjung Airport =

Airport in New Delhi, Delhi, India

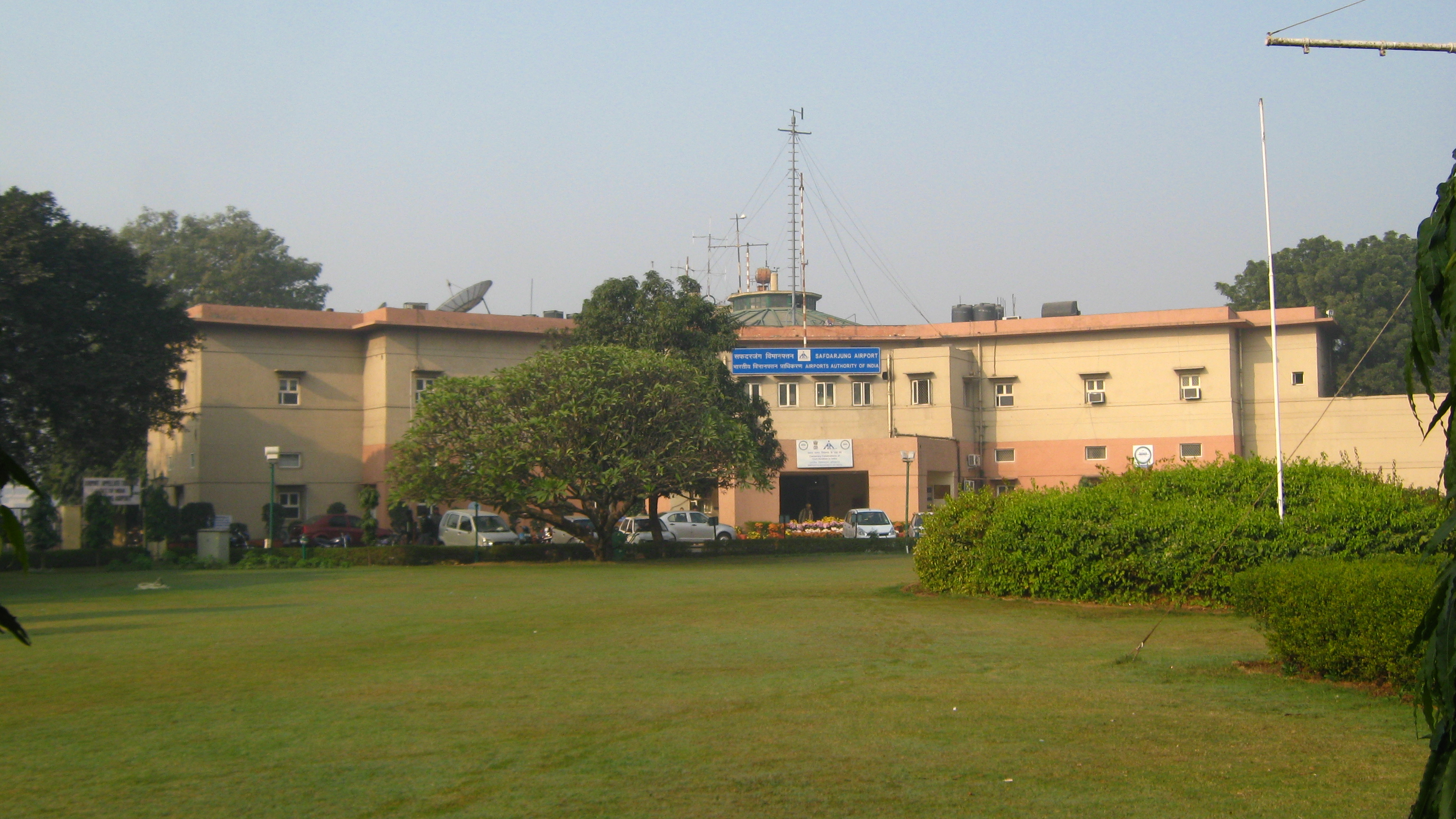
- Terminal building of Safdarjung Airport
- IATA: none; ICAO: VIDD

Summary
- Airport type: Public
- Owner: India
- Operator: Airports Authority of India
- Serves: New Delhi
- Location: Aurobindo Marg, Delhi
- Elevation AMSL: 805 ft (245 m)
- Coordinates: 28°35′04″N 077°12′21″E
- Interactive map of Safdarjung Airport

Runways
Direction	Length		Surface
Direction	ft	m	Surface
12/30	4,520	1,378	Asphalt

Statistics (April 2025 – March 2026)
- Passengers: 25(▼ -45.7%)
- Aircraft movements: 75 (▼ -18.5%)
- Cargo tonnage: 0 ( 0%)
- Source: AAI

Safdarjung Airport (IATA: N/A, ICAO: VIDD) is an airport in South Delhi, India, in the neighbourhood of the same name. Established during the British Raj as Willingdon Airfield, it started operations as an aerodrome in 1929, when it was India's third airport after the Calcutta Airport in Kolkata and Juhu Aerodrome in Mumbai. It was used extensively during the Second World War as it was part of the South Atlantic air ferry route, and later during Indo-Pakistani War of 1947. Once situated on the edge of Lutyens' Delhi, today, it has the entire city of New Delhi around it. It remained the city's main airport until 1962, when operations shifted to Palam Airport completely by the late 1960s, as it could not support the new bigger aircraft such as jet aircraft.

The Delhi Flying Club was established here in 1928 with two de Havilland Moth aircraft named ‘Delhi’ and ‘Roshanara’. The airport functioned until 2001, however in January 2002, due to security considerations in the post 9/11 scenario, the government closed the airport for flying activities, the club only carries out aircraft maintenance courses today. Today it is mostly used for VVIP helicopter passenger flights to the Indira Gandhi International Airport including the President and the Prime Minister. The 190 acre airport complex has the Rajiv Gandhi Bhawan on its grounds, which houses the Ministry of Civil Aviation as well as the headquarters of the Airports Authority of India (AAI).

== History ==
Willingdon Airfield, as it was first known, was named after Lord Willingdon, the Viceroy and Governor-General of India (1931–36). It was contracted by Gurcharan Singh, Ram Singh Kabli and Sir Sobha Singh. As New Delhi's first airport, it initially used grass runways and tents. The first airmail flight arrived on 30 November 1918. Also in the same year, the first London-Cairo-Delhi flight landed. It took another decade for complete airport infrastructure to come up, when the first commercial flight landed in 1927. In 1928, Willingdon Airfield was renamed 'Willingdon Airport' and Delhi Flying Club was established.

In 1941, when the British Indian Army decided to raise its own airborne/parachute units, the southwest corner of the airport served as the site where the Air Landing School (ALS) of the Royal Indian Air Force was located and started operations. It was here the first paratroopers in India were trained, which included the first Indian paratrooper, Lt (later Col) AG Ranjaraj, MVC, (Indian Medical Service and the Regimental Medical Officer of the 152 (Indian) Parachute Battalion) and earned their wings.

Units

- Air Headquarters India Communication Squadron RAF
- Base Air Forces, Southeast Asia Communication Squadron RAF
- Headquarters Air Command Southeast Asia (Communication) Squadron RAF

=== Post-independence ===
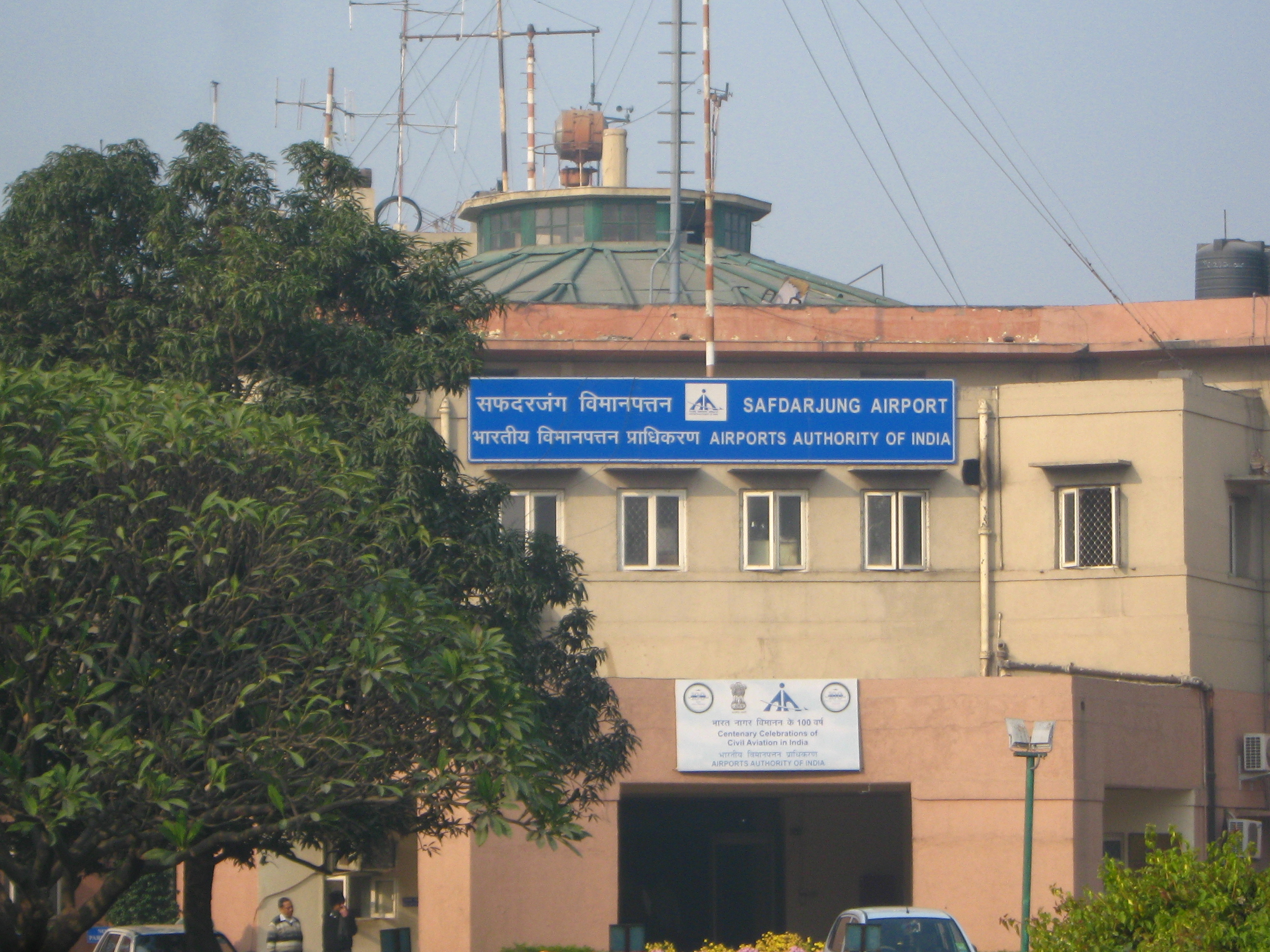
Safdarjung Airport, Airports Authority of India.

Post-independence in 1947, Willingdon was renamed Safdarjung, after nearby Safdarjung's Tomb, which serves as a backdrop to the airport. It served as Delhi's main airport for over two decades, until a new site was chosen in west Delhi, known as Palam, then on city's outskirts, giving its Palam Airport. Palam Airport, started as RAF Station Palam, during World War II, is now much enlarged and known as Indira Gandhi International Airport, where the passenger operations were shifted in 1962 due to an increase in traffic. It is still used for general aviation purposes and small propeller planes take off and land from the airport. However, planes are cautioned when landing, since the airport is situated right next to a flyover highway. Indira Gandhi International Airport is the airport serving New Delhi; a much larger airport with four runways and over sixty domestic and international carriers serving it.

In 2001, after 9/11 the Ministry of Home Affairs decided to use the airport as the emergency getaway for the President and the PM. Thereafter in 2002, for security considerations, the government closed the airport for all public flying activities, and all Delhi Flying Club (DFC) flights were shifted to Hisar Airport. Since then, the airport is largely being used for VVIP helicopter transit to the Indira Gandhi International Airport for security reasons and also to avoid blocking vehicular traffic during the process. Since the early 2000s, when going on foreign trip, the PM receives his send-offs from his cabinet members and other dignitaries here, instead of the main airport. The airstrip is also used for small aircraft of state chief ministers such as those of Punjab and Haryana, making it to 80 to 90 helicopter movements every month. and occasionally by Airport Authority of India, and Helicopter service company, Pawan Hans.

During the 2010 Commonwealth Games, it was used as a park-and-ride facility, for parking of vehicles for those going to the Jawaharlal Nehru Stadium. Spread over 1,70,000 sq.m., the parking area could accommodate 3000 cars, 6000 two-wheelers and 450 buses of the shuttle service bus. In a year-long project, the NDMC undertook extensive renovation of the area, which included construction of new roads within the airport premises, and installation of jersey barriers between the main tarmac and temporary parking area.

A 1.5 kilometres (0.93 mi) long tunnel connects the Indian prime minister's residence to Safdarjung Airport, where VVIP helicopters land. Constructed beyond Kemal Atatürk Marg, Golf Course and Safdarjung Tomb and then an overground drive to surface at the helicopter hangar at the airport, work on the tunnel began in 2010 and was completed by July 2014 and Modi was the first PM to use it.

Nearby residential areas of this airport are Jorbagh, Laxmibai Nagar, INA Colony which houses employees of Airport Authority, and Sarojini Nagar.

== Facilities ==
The headquarters of the Airports Authority of India, which functions under the Ministry of Civil Aviation and manages most of the airports in India, and the ministry itself is located in Rajiv Gandhi Bhawan on the grounds of the airport. The Indira Gandhi Rashtriya Uran Akademi has its Delhi liaison office in the administrative block of the airport.

The Directorate General of Civil Aviation has its headquarters opposite of the airport.

An office building, Udaan Bhawan, opened on the airport property in 2023. The Aircraft Accident Investigation Bureau (AAIB) has its head office in that building. Previously the AAIB head office was elsewhere on the airport property.

There is a special link from Prime Minister residence, 7, Race Course Road, to Safadarjung Airport. Safdarjung airport serves as a conduit for flying VVIPs to Indira Gandhi International Airport when they travel out of Delhi.

== Accidents and incidents ==
- On 5 December 1970, Douglas DC-3 VT-CZC of Jamair crashed shortly after take-off, following an engine failure. The aircraft was operating a non-scheduled passenger flight. Five of the sixteen people on board were killed.
- Sanjay Gandhi died in an air crash on 23 June 1980 near Safdarjung Airport in New Delhi. He was flying a new aircraft of the Delhi Flying Club, and, while performing a loop over his office, lost control and crashed. The only passenger in the plane, Captain Subhash Saxena, was also killed in the plane crash.
- During 1971–72, a Tiger Moth training aircraft took off and crashed killing two training pilots, Rajinder Bhatia and Pawar.

== Popular culture ==
Safdarjung Airport is the setting for part of The Adventures of Tintin comic, Tintin in Tibet, by Hergé. Tintin, Snowy, and Captain Haddock have a stop-over in India, and they depart from Willingdon Airfield (now Safdarjung Airport).
