= Airports Authority of India =

Statutory body under Ministry of civil aviation, Govt. of India

- Airports Authority of India

- Ministry of Civil Aviation
- Type: Category-1 Public Sector Enterprise under Ministry of Civil Aviation
- Industry: Airport Construction and Maintenance
- Predecessor: Civil Aviation Department, Government of India
- Founded: 1 April 1995; 31 years ago
- Headquarters: Rajiv Gandhi Bhawan, Safdarjung Airport, New Delhi-110003, New Delhi, India
- Area served: India
- Key people: Puneet Kansal (chairman); Vir Vikram Yadav , DGCA (Ex-Officio)
- Products: Airport management and Air Navigation Services (ANS)
- Owner: Ministry of Civil Aviation, Government of India
- Number of employees: 17,346 (As on 31.03.2020)
- Divisions: Indian Airports
- Website: www.aai.aero/en

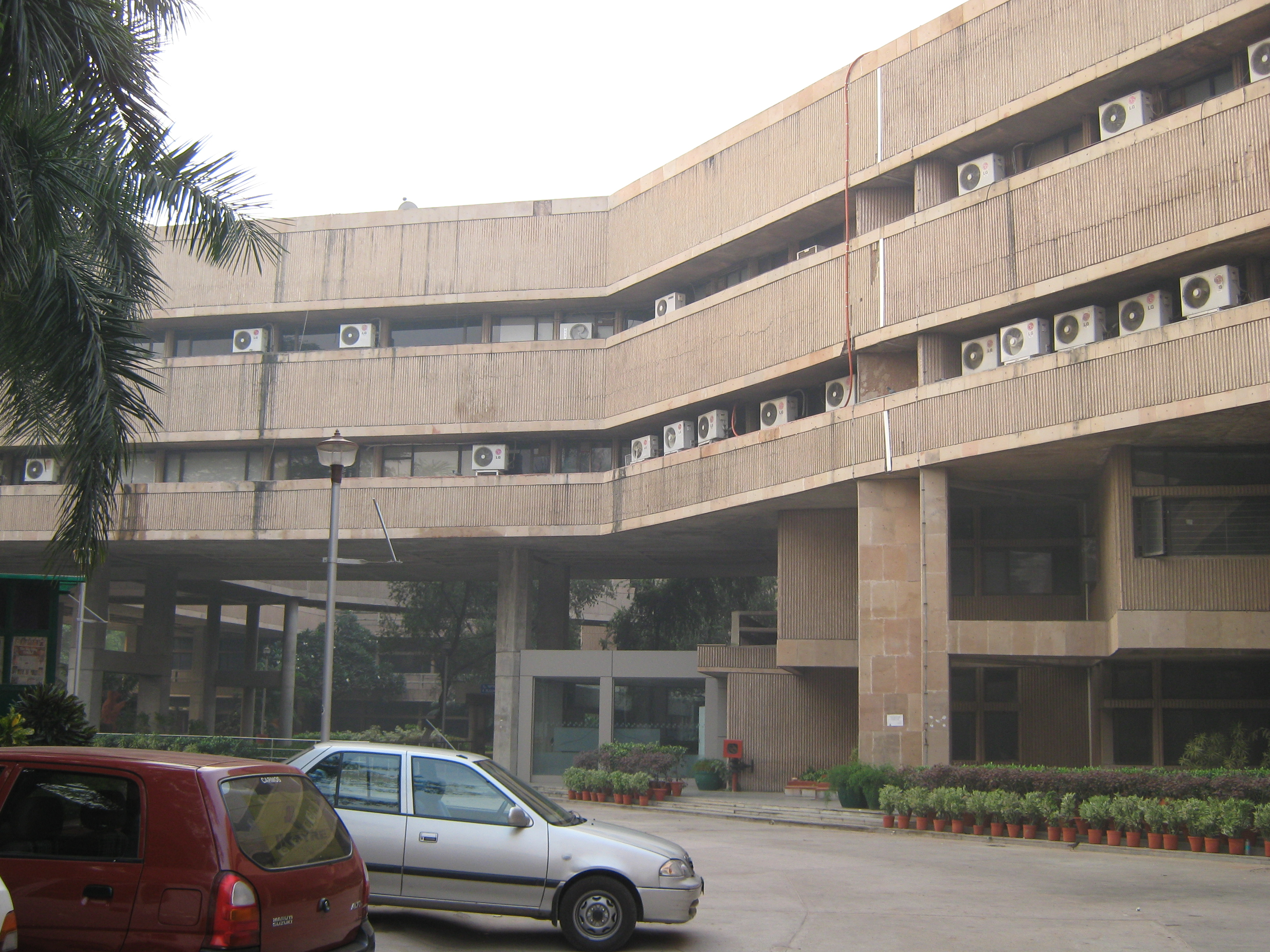
Rajiv Gandhi Bhawan

The Airports Authority of India (AAI) is a Category-1 Public Sector Enterprise under the ownership of the Ministry of Civil Aviation, Government of India. It is responsible for creating, upgrading, maintaining, and managing civil aviation infrastructure in India. It provides Communication Navigation Surveillance/Air Traffic Management (CNS/ATM) services over the Indian airspace and adjoining oceanic areas. AAI currently manages a total of 137 airports, including 34 international airports, 10 Customs Airports, 81 domestic airports, and 23 Civil enclaves at Defense airfields. AAI also has ground installations at all airports and 25 other locations to ensure the safety of aircraft operations. AAI covers all major air routes over the Indian landmass via 29 Radar installations at 11 locations along with 700 VOR/DVOR installations co-located with Distance Measuring Equipment (DME). 52 runways are provided with Instrument landing system (ILS) installations with Night Landing Facilities at most of these airports and an Automatic Message Switching System at 15 Airports.

== History ==
The Government of India constituted the International Airports Authority of India (IAAI) in 1972 to manage the nation's international airports while the National Airports Authority of India (NAAI) was constituted in 1986 to look after domestic airports. The organizations were merged in April 1995 by an Act of Parliament, namely, the Airports Authority of India Act, 1994 and has been constituted as a statutory body and were named the Airports Authority of India (AAI). This new organization was to be responsible for creating, upgrading, maintaining and managing civil aviation infrastructure both on the ground and in airspace in the country

== Major ongoing projects ==
AAI's implementation of the Automatic Dependence Surveillance System (ADSS) at Kolkata and Chennai Air Traffic Control Centers made India the first country to use this technology in the Southeast Asian region thus enabling air traffic control over oceanic areas using satellite mode of communication. Performance Based Navigation (PBN) procedures have already been implemented at Mumbai, Delhi and Ahmedabad Airports. AAI is implementing the GAGAN project in technological collaboration with the Indian Space Research Organization (ISRO). The navigation signals thus received from the GPS will be augmented to achieve the navigational requirement of aircraft. The first phase of the technology demonstration system was completed in February 2008.

== Organizational structure ==
AAI has five training establishments, including three ATS training organizations (ATSTO) viz.

1. The Civil Aviation Training College (CATC) in Prayagraj, Uttar Pradesh.
2. Hyderabad Training Center (HTC) in Hyderabad, Telangana.
3. National Institute of Aviation Training and Management (NIATAM) in Gondia, Maharashtra.
4. Indian Aviation Academy (National Institute of Aviation Management and Research (NIAMAR) at Delhi (a joint venture of Airports Authority of India, Directorate General of Civil Aviation (India) and Bureau of Civil Aviation Security, Govt of India)
5. Fire Training Centers (FTC) in Delhi and Kolkata.

=== Radio Construction & Development Unit ===
Radio Construction & Development Unit Office

RCDU was established to centralize and strengthen AAI’s technical capacity for CNS infrastructure. Over the years, it expanded its scope to include equipment lifecycle management, modernization, and international calibration support. The Flight Inspection Unit (FIU) ensures the accuracy of navigational aids through flight calibration. In addition to domestic projects, RCDU and FIU extend calibration services to neighbouring countries under bilateral agreements, supporting regional aviation safety.

== Criticism ==
=== Airport Safety Issues ===
The AAI has faced some negative reception for consistently ignoring safety recommendations, especially at critical airports. A safety report from 2011 revealed that the Calicut Airport was unsafe during wet weather landings, but still continued to allow it, which led to scrutiny after the crash of Air India Express Flight 1344 in August 2020. The report came after the crash of Air India Express Flight 812 in May 2010 at Mangalore International Airport, which has a tabletop runway.

=== Infrastructure Quality ===
Nationwide, several airports have faced poor reviews due to bad infrastructure, dirty restrooms, poor hygiene, lack of proper transport in between terminals, baggage collection issues, long lines for immigration and security, and cab scam incidents, which the AAI has consistently failed to address despite complaints and criticism. A 2015 survey revealed that Chennai Airport has been rated Asia's worst airports for such reasons. The lack of proper planning and bureaucratic hurdles has been attributed for these issues, aside from older terminal buildings which have not been upgraded and refurbished or renovated with time.

To counter these issues, new greenfield airports with modern amenities are being built, which will relieve passenger capacity overloads, give higher quality amenities, and improve punctuality.

=== Overpriced Passenger Amenities ===
The AAI has been criticized for insufficient monitoring and regulation of passenger amenities and facilities such as food and beverages, that have been reportedly expensive. This has been notably rampant at privatized airports, which has led to frequent criticism by travelers and prominent figures. The high prices has been notably attributed to the high airport rentals, high revenue shares charged by private operators, cost of inventory, and employee salaries as only those with security clearances can be allowed to work. To solve this, the Government launched an affordable Udaan Yatri Cafe at various airports that provide meals and drinks at lower prices.

The AAI has also faced scrutiny over other passenger services, especially Wi-Fi service. As per officials of the Telecom Regulatory Authority of India, airport Wi-Fi service, which is constituted as public network, requires KYC (know your customer) details for security reasons, due to which Wi-Fi access mandates use of PIN through Indian phone numbers. The restricted access has been condemned by travelers due to inconvenience, mostly to international passengers either visiting or transiting, limited timeframe to use for only 45 minutes, and unstable network. Despite criticism and negative reviews posted by travelers on Skytrax and Tripadvisor, the TRAI and AAI have consistently refused to change the rules citing safety reasons, which have affected ratings of both domestic and international airports nationwide when compared to other nations.
