= Racecourse (disambiguation) =

A racecourse is a horse racing track.

Racecourse may also refer to:

- Racecourse, Queensland, Australia, a suburb of Mackay
- Race Course, Vadodara, Gujarat, India
- Race Course, Jamaica
- Racecourse station (MTR), a station on the East Rail Line of Hong Kong
- Racecourse-class minesweeper, a United Kingdom naval ship class
- The Racecourse, a cricket and general sports ground at Durham University, England
- The Racecourse, Northampton, England
- Racecourse Bay, South Australia, a locality in the local government area of the District Council of Grant

== See also ==
- Race Course (disambiguation)
- Racecourse Ground (disambiguation)
- Race Course Cemetery, Freetown, Sierra Leone
- Race Course Road, Delhi, India; now Lok Kalyan Marg
  - Race Course (Delhi Metro)
- Racecourse Road, Brisbane
- Racecourse station (disambiguation)
