= Race Course =

Race Course may refer to:

- Race Course, Jamaica, a settlement in Clarendon Parish in Jamaica
- Race Course, Vadodara, an area on the western side of Vadodara City in the state of Gujarat in India
- Race Course Road, Delhi, India; now Lok Kalyan Marg
  - Race Course (Delhi Metro)
- Lagos Race Course, a 14.5-hectare ceremonial ground in Lagos, Nigeria

== See also ==
- Racecourse (disambiguation)
