= Manish Arora =

Indian fashion designer

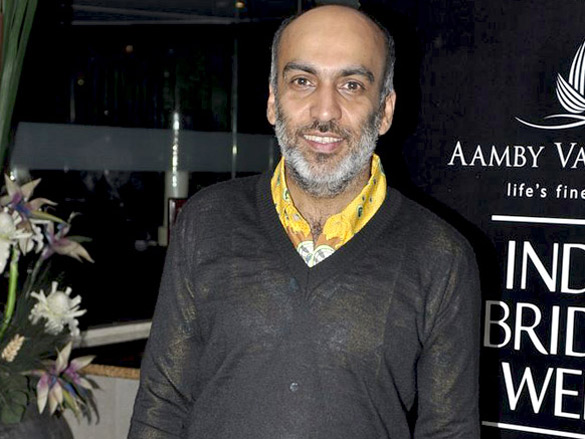
- Occupation: Fashion designer
- Labels: Manish Arora; Fish Fry; Paco Rabanne

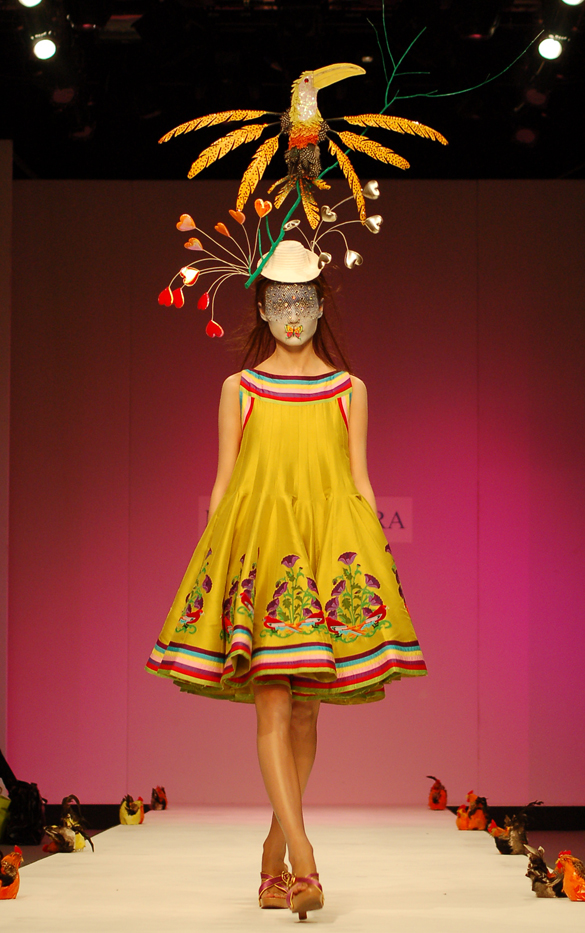
Model in a Manish Arora design (Spring 2007 collection) at London Fashion Week

Manish Arora is an Indian fashion designer based in New Delhi. In early 2011, he was appointed creative director of the womenswear collection of the French fashion house Paco Rabanne, although he left the company in May 2012.

Born and brought up in Mumbai, Manish was studying, when he decided to change his career path and applied for the National Institute of Fashion Technology in New Delhi. He graduated in 1994 after winning the Best Student Award.

== Career ==
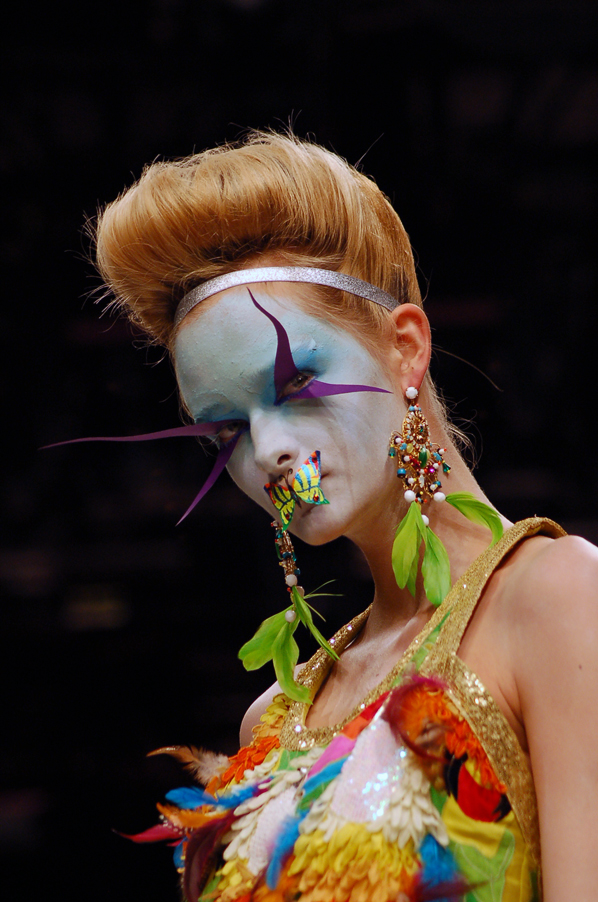
Model in a Manish Arora design (Spring 2007 collection) at London Fashion Week

In 1997, Manish launched his own label "Manish Arora" and started retailing in India. Three years later, he participated in the first-ever India Fashion Week held in New Delhi and represented India at the Hong Kong Fashion Week.

Arora launched his second label, "Fish Fry", in 2001. This sportswear-styled line was created in association with the athletic apparel manufacturer Reebok. In 2002, Manish opened his first flagship store, Manish Arora Fish Fry, in New Delhi and in the following year opened a second store in Mumbai. Another successful showing at India Fashion Week (2003) led to a stocking deal with the fashion house Maria Luisa (Paris) and the beginning of a successful export business.

During 2004, he was awarded the Best Women's Prêt Designer at the first ever Indian Fashion Awards' 2004 held in Bombay and MC2 Diffusion Paris started representing the label for the export business. The following year, Manish participated in the Miami Fashion Week in May 2005 where he was presented with the designer's choice for Best Collection Award.

He had a successful debut at the London Fashion Week in September 2005 and received an overwhelming response from the press as well as the buyers. He opened a new store at Lodhi Colony Market in New Delhi in December 2005. Arora exhibited some of his work at the Victoria & Albert Museum in London for an exhibition called "Global Local" in association with the British Council, India.

A fashion jury in a leading Indian publication Outlook designated him "Best Indian Fashion Designer" and featured him on the cover of its March 2006 issue. Manish opened his first Manish Arora franchise store in Villa Moda, Kuwait and another Manish Arora Fish Fry store at Crescent at The Qutub, New Delhi in 2006.

In 2007, the first Fish Fry for Reebok concept store opened at the Garden of Five Senses, New Delhi, and Arora teamed up with make-up and cosmetics company MAC for designing a signature collection. He has also collaborated with Swatch for a limited edition of watches. In 2008, once again, Reebok launched the 'RBK Fish Fry Collection 2008', a lifestyle range designed by Manish Arora.

"Indian by Manish Arora", a brand designed for the growing Indian market for women's wear, is licensed to another fashion company. Manish was invited to show his collection at the “Fashion in Motion” exhibition held at Victoria and Albert Museum, London in September 2007. By 2009, Manish owned four stores in India and sold his collections to more than 80 retailers worldwide. The designer has also entered into a joint venture with BIBA Apparels Pvt. Ltd. to further expand the label.

In 2007 the designer began showing collections in Paris Fashion Week, and in 2009 Arora was inducted into the Chambre Syndicale du Prêt à Porter des Couturiers.

In 2012, Arora previewed his jewellery line in association with label Amrapali comprising a range of hand jewellery, neckpieces and pendants. Other collaborations include a 2008 project with MAC cosmetics and a 2009 project with Swatch, as well as several projects with Swarovski.

Some of his work was displayed at the Victoria and Albert Museum, in the Fabric of India 2014-15 Exhibition.

In 2020, Arora closed his brand.

In 2024, the designer partnered with SCAD FASH to mount the exhibition "Manish Arora: Life is Beautiful," a career retrospective drawn from the designer's archive and highlighting his brand and collaborations. He was also included in the Texas Fashion Collection's permanent collection and in the 2024 two-part exhibition "Labor of Luxury: Embroidery from India to the World."

== Style ==
Manish Arora is regarded by many as "the John Galliano of India". He is known for his psychedelic colour palette and kitsch motifs in garments that combine traditional Indian crafts like embroidery, appliqué and beading with Western silhouettes.

== See also ==
- National institute of fashion technology
