= Hanif Kureshi =

Indian street artist and designer (1982–2024)

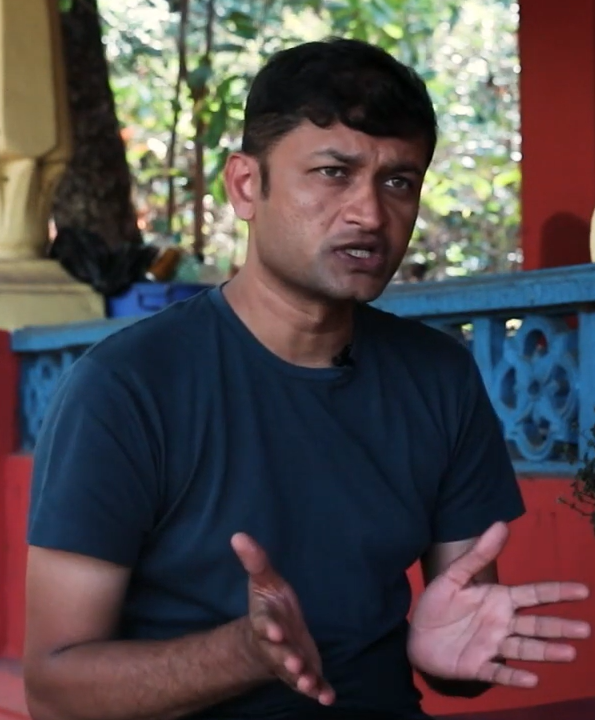
- Kureshi in 2023
- Born: 12 October 1982; Palitana, Gujarat, India
- Died: 22 September 2024 (aged 41); Goa, India
- Education: Maharaja Sayajirao University of Baroda
- Known for: Street typography St+art India Foundation; Guerrilla Art & Design
- Notable work: HandpaintedType; Time Changes Everything
- Style: Street art

Hanif Kureshi (12 October 1982 – 22 September 2024), also known by the graffiti name Daku, was an Indian artist, designer, and advertising professional. Kureshi was a pioneering figure in India's street art movement, helping to transform urban spaces into public canvases and bringing art out of the museums to the wider public in India.

Kureshi's early childhood experiences with hand-painted signage led to his lifelong interest in typography and street art, with his first apprenticeship with local painters creating hand-painted license plates. He studied art at Maharaja Sayajirao University of Baroda, later pursuing a career in advertising. He started working as a graffiti artist in the late 2000s, moving on to large-scale street art and murals, often collaborating with artists from around the world.

After seeing the impact of modern digital design and printing replacing the local artists of his youth, he started the HandpaintedType project as an attempt to preserve typographic practices and styles unique to Indian street sign painters and provide them with an income stream. Kureshi went on to co-found the St+art India Foundation to help popularise street art throughout the country, with notable work produced in the Lodhi Art District in Delhi, the Sassoon Dock art project in Mumbai, and the Bangalore Metro.

== Early life ==
Kureshi was born on 12 October 1982 in Palitana, a town in the Bhavnagar district of Gujarat. He first began working with street painters during his school vacations. He apprenticed with local painters who specialised in hand-painted licence plates. Encouraged by his father, he decided to become an artist himself, graduating with a degree in arts from the Maharaja Sayajirao University of Baroda.

== Career ==
Kureshi began his professional career in advertising, starting with the advertising agency Ogilvy & Mather in 2003 where he went on to become a senior art director. He later moved to the advertising agency Wieden+Kennedy in 2008 where he became a senior creative. That same year, he first began working as a graffiti artist on the streets using the pseudonym Daku (transl. Bandit). In 2011, while still at the agency, Kureshi started the HandpaintedType project as an attempt to preserve the typographic practices and styles of Indian street sign painters for future generations before they disappeared. (Note: Kureshi 2011: "HandpaintedType is a project that is dedicated to preserving the typographic practice of street painters around India. These painters, with the advent of local DTP (Desktop Publishers) shops, are rapidly going out of business with many of them switching to the quicker, cheaper but uglier vinyls. Many painters have given up their practice altogether. The project involves documenting the typefaces of road side painters across India and digitizing it so that it serves as a resource for present and future generation...I felt that I should do something...before painters disappear from streets. I also thought it important to preserve this art form for future generations to understand and hopefully, appreciate.")

HandpaintedType documented the typefaces of at least 18 roadside painters in India, recording brief biographical data and producing at least two short documentary videos. Kureshi released an initial free, digitised street font to the public based on the project, followed by a later commercial release, whose proceeds were intended to provide a source of revenue for the traditional sign painters being displaced by digital printing. In 2011, Kureshi made several presentations to professional organisations about the data they collected, including one at the Typography Day conference in Ahmedabad followed by a larger, formal presentation at the 2011 ATypI typography conference in Reykjavík. Following his stint at Wieden+Kennedy, Kureshi left the advertising world to focus on street art and sign painting.

=== St+art India Foundation ===
In 2013, Kureshi co-founded the St+art India Foundation along with Giulia Ambrogi, Thanish Thomas, Akshat Nauriyal, and investor Rajeev Bahl. The foundation, whose name is a combination of "Street" and "Art" (pronounced "Start"), is a not-for-profit organisation dedicated to promoting street art across India. The foundation worked on transforming neighbourhoods through large-scale murals and street art installations. One of the foundation's notable projects was the Lodhi Art District in Delhi, one of India's first open-air public art districts, which features over 60 murals created by national and international artists. The foundation went on to start seven art districts across the country; four are currently still active: Lodhi, Mahim in Mumbai, Nochi in Chennai, and Ukkadam in Coimbatore.

=== Artistic contributions ===
Kureshi's art blended traditional Indian aesthetics with modern public art practices. His murals often incorporated elements of Indian culture, including typographic works that played with regional languages and local traditions. His large-scale public art pieces can be seen in various Indian cities, including murals at the Bangalore Metro, the Sassoon Dock art project and the Churchgate railway station in Mumbai, and in the streets of Panaji in Goa. Some of his works were noted as a commentary on the socio-economic situation in the country including increasing wealth inequality, urban apathy, and an emerging water crisis in the country's major cities. His early works included stencilled art with provocative messages, often involving political activism. He addressed topics like moral and cultural policing and urban issues involving garbage management. (Note: See Khurana, Sanchita (2024). "Cast(e)ing a Subversive 'Sensible': The Symbology of Cultural Resistance in Dalit Writing". In Tamanna Priya (Ed.) and Amrit Mishra (Ed.) Dalits and Dalit Lives in 21st Century India: Towards a New Politics. Vernon Press. pp. 12-13. ISBN 9798881900366. OCLC 1455329869.)

He collaborated with Crew 156, their founding member JonOne, and other artists such as Bond and Zine. His earlier street work was considered more cynical and pseudonymous with him often using stealth to render graffiti and other street messaging, an approach that he moved away from in the latter part of his career. This had some calling him the "Banksy of India" referring to the pseudonymous English graffiti artist Banksy. In an interview with the BBC as Daku, he stated that he respected Banksy's work but did not find comparisons "flattering" as he felt his work was "separate" and had "a very Indian aesthetic".

In some of his art, particularly his time series, Kureshi experiments with light and shadow. In Time Changes Everything (2015–2016), a typographical work created under his Daku pseudonym in Lodhi Colony, New Delhi, Kureshi plays with the notions of light, shadows, and time, emphasising the ever-changing and short-lived quality of both human life and street art. In the outdoor installation, a series of more than 70 words appears in black on three, forward-facing wall partitions on a building painted white. There is no colour, and the words are not painted with ink. The design first appears visible at around 9:30 a.m. when sunlight begins casting shadows through horizontal, parallel sheets of metal facing down. At that time, various words start appearing on the wall and become most vivid at noon time. The words describe "time, motion and change", ideas Kureshi returns to in his art. He used SketchUp 3D modelling software and Google Maps to help plan the piece, estimating the Sun's movement to get the shadows just right so that people passing by could read the words. Due to the orientation of the wall, from 15 May to 15 August the wall appears completely blank.

=== Commercial work ===
In 2019, Kureshi was creative director of two art projects, a mural project illustrated by Dattaraj M. Naik, and an embroidery installation by Johnson Kshetrimayum, both for the first Uniqlo store in India, located at the Ambience Mall, Vasant Kunj in New Delhi.

== Later exhibitions and death ==
Kureshi's work was exhibited at international art events and venues, including the London Design Biennale, Venice Biennale, Centre Pompidou in Paris, and the Triannale Design Museum in Milan. In India, his work appeared at the India Art, Architecture and Design Biennale at the Red Fort in Delhi. In June 2024, he held a solo exhibition at Wildstyle Gallery in Sweden; by that time, he had dealt with lung cancer for a year. He died with the disease in Goa on 22 September 2024 aged 41, leaving behind a wife Rutva and 5 year old son Bramha.

== Selected works ==
- Fuck (2011)
- Time Flies / Time Fades, Kochi (2012)
- Stop Pretending (2013)
- Stop Promising (2013)
- Stop Raping (2013)
- Stop Shopping (2013)
- Stop Vandalism (2013)
- Stop Honking (2013)
- Mat Do (2013)
- This is Not Street Art (2014)
- India Art Fair
  - This is Commissioned Vandalism (2015)
- WIP: The Street Art Show
  - Breathe (2015-2016)
- Lodhi Colony, New Delhi
  - Time Changes Everything (2015-2016)
  - We Love Dilli (2015-2016)
- Chakraview, London Design Biennale (2016)
- Sassoon Dock Art Project, Mumbai
  - The Idea of Smell (2017)
- Swarovski Indian Mela, Austria
  - Life is Beautiful (2017)
- Lodhi Colony, New Delhi
  - This Must Be The Place (2019)
- Panjim, Goa
  - Theory of Time (2019)
- Serendipity Arts Festival, Goa
  - Photobooth (2020)
- Chennai
  - Saurashtra (2020)
- Serendipity Arts Festival, Goa (2020)
- New Delhi
  - Friction at Kona (2020)
- Chandigarh
  - Bonjour India (2020)
- Kannagi Art District
  - Time Repeats (2021)
- India Art, Architecture and Design Biennale, Red Fort, Delhi
  - Cycle of Time (2023)
