= Lodi Road =

- Road
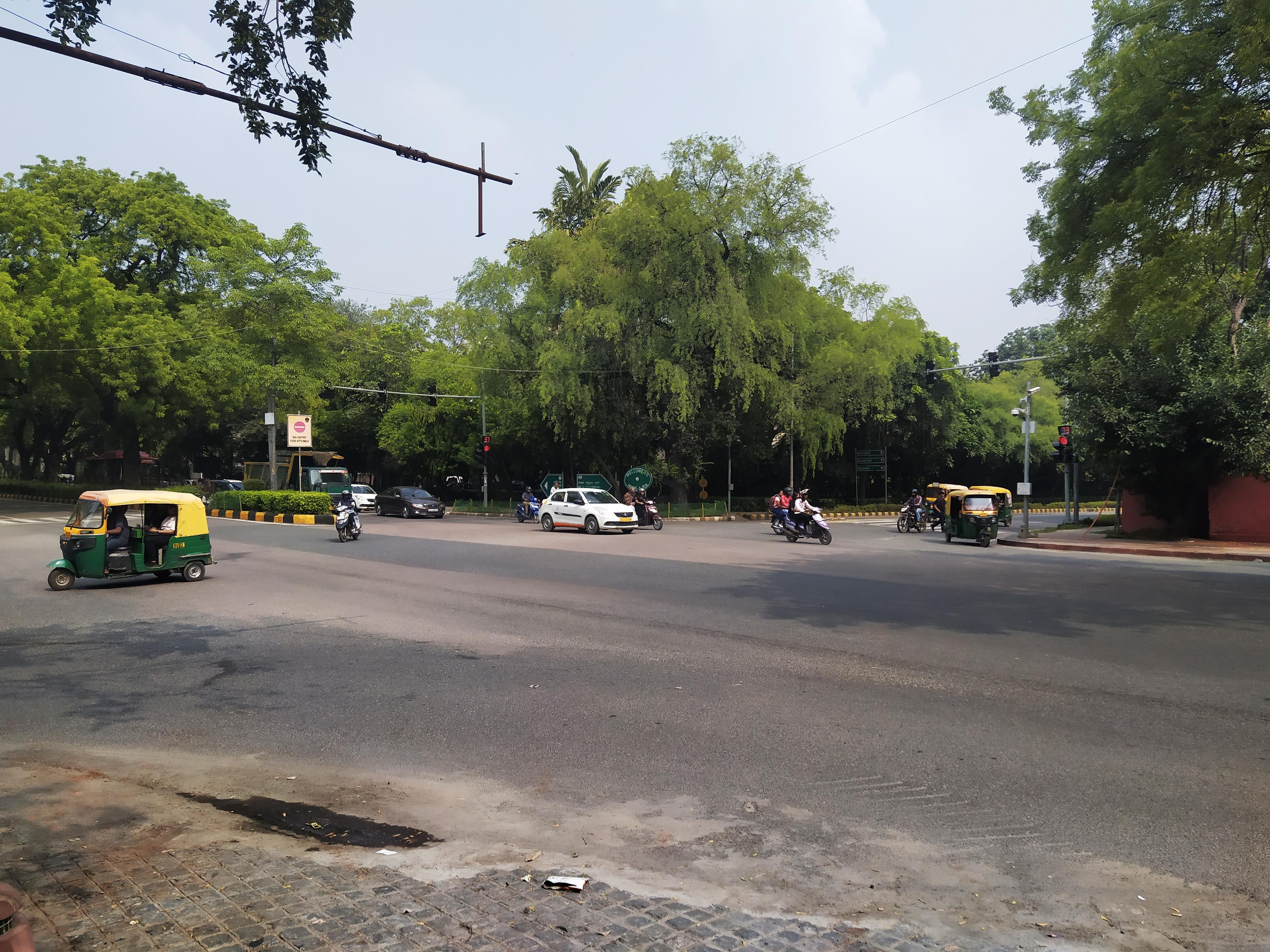

- Location in Delhi, India
- Coordinates: 28.5920784827°N 77.228387091°E
- Country: India
- State: Delhi
- District: New Delhi
- Metro: New Delhi

Languages
  - Official: Hindi
- Time zone: UTC+5:30 (IST)
- PIN: 110003
- Civic agency: NDMC

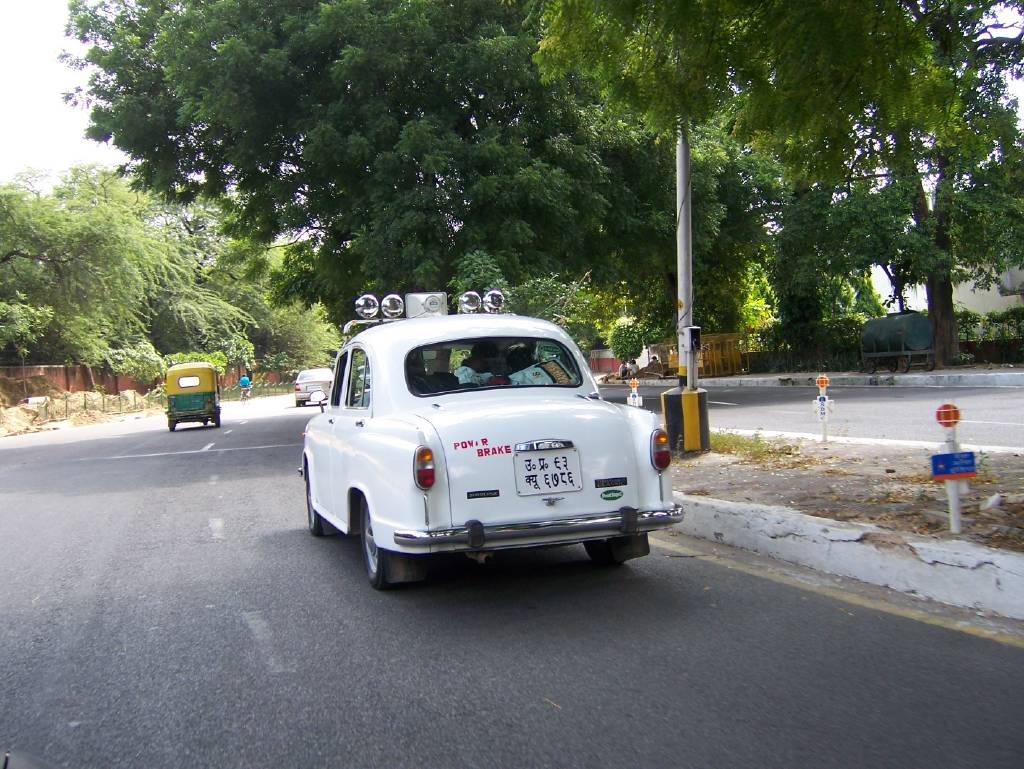
The tree-lined Lodi Road, New Delhi

Lodhi Road (Hindi: लोदी रोड) in New Delhi, India, is named after the Lodi Gardens located on it. Two Mughal mausoleums, Humayun's Tomb and Safdarjung's Tomb, lie at the eastern and western ends of the road respectively. A number of cultural, educational, and international institutions line the road. The Jor Bagh metro station lies under Aurobindo Marg near its intersection with Lodi Road. Also located near it are Lodi colony and Lodi Estate built during British Raj in 1940s, and Lodi Road Institutional Area.

== History ==
The road follows a 14th-century dirt track connecting Ghiyathpur (now Nizamuddin) village with the Bagh-i Jud (from which the present day Jor Bagh is derived), one of the earliest orchards mentioned in Sultanate records, before joining the larger road from Rewari and Gurgaon. It has been used by invading armies, most famously by Timur's troops in 1398.

The road has always marked a boundary between neighbouring settlements. During the 15th century it divided the Kotla Mubarakpur (of the Sayyids) from the necropolis of the Lodis. In the 16th and 17th centuries it marked the boundary between the Delhi and Mehrauli tehsils. The masonry bridge over the now dried-up rivulet of Jaitpur (the village occupying the site razed by the British in 1912) is a reminder of Mughal Emperor Akbar's interest in the region. By the late 18th century the road marked the edge of the then controversial Shia enclave of Alipur, which contained the remains, houses, and troops of some estranged Persian nobles of the later Mughal court.

== Overview ==
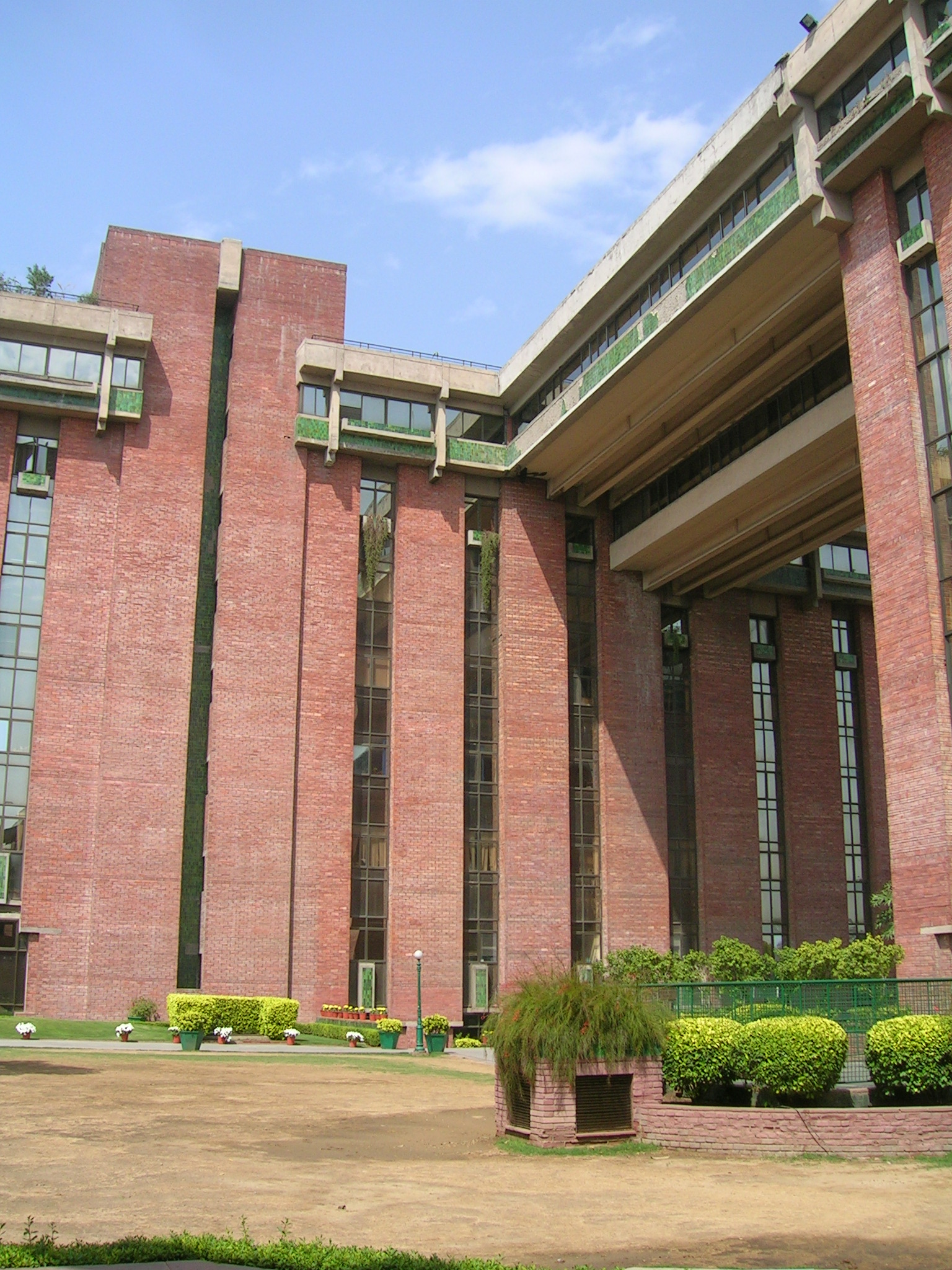
India Habitat Centre (IHC), Lodi Road, in Stein's typical architectural style

The road marked the edge of the original New Delhi Plan, and still defines the Lutyens Bungalow Zone (Lutyens' Delhi). Almost all the trees lining New Delhi's avenues can be traced to the Lodi Road nursery, created as New Delhi was being planned. The road was significantly widened in preparation for the Asian Games of 1982.

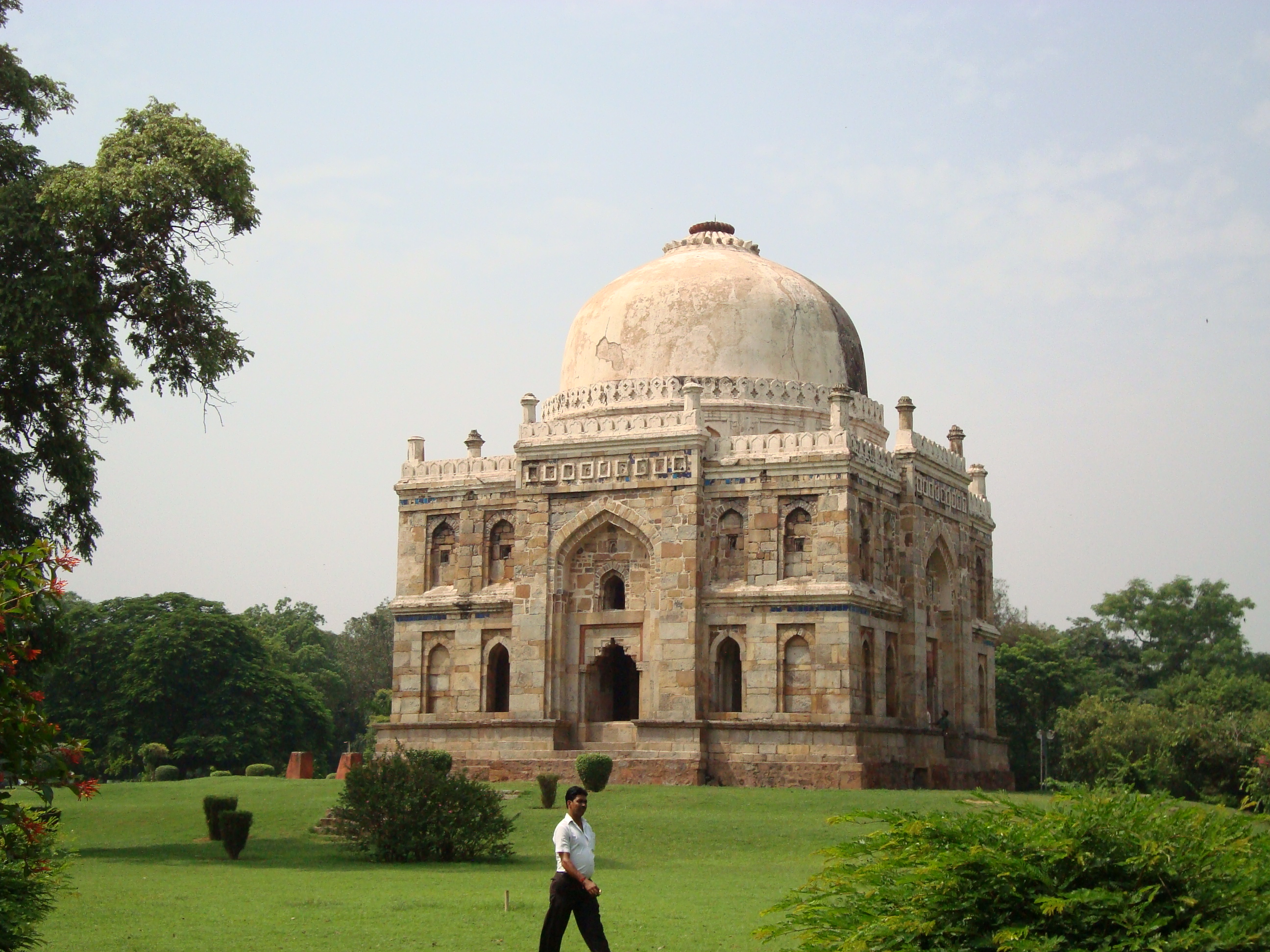
Sheesh Gumbad in Lodi Gardens

The post-independence spurt of institutions constructed along Lodi Road began with Jawaharlal Nehru's gift of some minor bungalow plots to the India International Center (IIC). The Ford Foundation, the architectural input of Joseph Allen Stein, the "brown sahib" bureaucrat nexus, and the approval of the Indian government, allowed the gradual growth of institutions built in a sultanate-cum-prairie architectural style extending as far as the Lodi tombs in Lodi Gardens, which Stein re-landscaped in 1968.

The Meteorological Department was soon followed by the international development community active in Delhi during the 1960s. UNICEF, WHF, and others acquired plots in what was developing into an enclave for the diplomatic and government elite. Subsequently, the Chinmaya Mission, World Bank, INTACH and India Habitat Centre (IHC) constructed buildings in sympathetic materials and architectural styles. The area was referred to as Steinabad, and Stein remained involved with the construction until the early 1990s. In addition, the Research and Analysis Wing, India's external intelligence agency, is headquartered at Lodi Road.

The area is largely an exclusive, elite preserve in the heart of the city, containing the offices of many large Indian companies.

Lodhi Road is aligned to point in the direction of Mecca.

== Attractions ==
- Lodi Garden
- Lodhi Art District
- Aliganj Lodi Road

== Landmarks ==
- Aman Hotel – featuring a 50-metre pool
- Air Force Bal Bharati School
- Dyal Singh College, Delhi
- Institute of Company Secretaries of India, Headquarters
