= Maqtha Art District =

Neighborhood in Hyderabad, India

Coordinates: 17°25′11″N 78°27′49″E

The Maqtha Art District is a neighborhood in Hyderabad, India, known for its street art and murals that cover building walls and public spaces. It is located near Raj Bhavan and Hussain Sagar Lake, next to the Necklace Road station. It is among several urban art districts in India, including the Lodhi Art District in Delhi and the Mahim (East) Art District in Mumbai.

== Origins and St+art India Foundation ==
The Maqtha Art District project began in 2016, led by the St+Art India Foundation in partnership with Asian Paints. St+art India Foundation is a non-profit organization that promotes street art in public spaces across India. The initiative included contributions from 38 artists, including international participants such as Delphine Delas (France) and Sadhu X (Nepal). Since their inception, the murals have been periodically repainted.

== Structure and districts ==
The area is informally divided into four zones: Pink Gully, Yellow Gully, Green Gully, and Blue Chowk. These color-coded sections and directional arrows help visitors navigate the area.

== List of artists involved ==
Artists who have painted works in the district include:

- Delphine Delas (France)
- SadduX (Nepal)
- Raghav Balla (Bangalore, India)
- Swathi Vijay (Hyderabad, India)
- Hoozinc (Hyderabad, India)
- Varun Vedavyas (Hyderabad, India)
- Harit Puram (Hyderabad, India)
- Rouge (France)
- Ness Lee (Canada)
- Manola Mesa (Spain)

== Mural themes ==
In the Maqtha Art District, murals depict themes related to social concerns, daily life, and regional culture. One example is a work by French artist Rouge, which features a composition of intertwined saris, symbolizing challenges faced by women in a patriarchal context.

== Social impact and community engagement ==
Initially, the project received a mixed response from local residents. However, as changes became visible, more residents supported the initiative. The project has contributed to changes in the area's visual appearance, and has attracted interest from outside the community. According to the St+art Foundation, the project is part of a larger effort to make public art more accessible and inclusive.

== Visiting Maqtha ==
The district can be explored on foot, with painted arrows leading visitors through the streets.
