= Meharchand Market =

Retail area in Delhi

- Neighbourhood
- Location in Delhi
- Coordinates: 28°35′5″N 77°13′34″E
- County: India
- State: Delhi
- Established: 1948
- Founder: Mehr Chand Khanna
- Time zone: UTC+5:30 (IST)
- PIN: 110003

Meharchand Market (or Mehar Chand) is a retail hub in Lodhi Colony, South Delhi. The market is a shopping hub known for its designer stores, cafes, and street art. Meharchand Market was established in 1948 as a refugee market and was renamed in 1962 after the then-Union Minister Mehr Chand Khanna. In 2018, illegal constructions by shopkeepers led to shop closures. This eventually resulted in a 2020 redevelopment plan that allows multi-story structures. By 2022, sealed shops began reopening and redevelopment is still ongoing as of 2024.

== History ==
Meharchand Market was initially established in 1948 as a refugee market, when 240 makeshift shops were allocated to refugees who had fled Pakistan after the partition of India in 1947. In 1962, the market was renamed as Meharchand Market after the then-Union Minister for Rehabilitation, Mehr Chand Khanna. After its establishment and renaming, Meharchand Market became known for its tailoring shops and tent houses. By the mid-2010s, Meharchand Market was known as an upscale and trendy shopping area.

However, by 2018, many of the markets' shops were sealed by a Supreme Court-appointed committee as shopkeepers had illegally built more space for their shops, leaving only the ground floors compliant with the market's original plan. In 2020, a redevelopment scheme for Meharchand Market was approved by the then-South Delhi Municipal Corporation, which would allow a 90% ground coverage with a 350 floor area ratio. This would allow shopkeeper build a basement, ground, first and second floors. In 2022, the sealed shops began to be unsealed by the Municipal Council of Delhi after approval from the Supreme Court-appointed monitoring committee. As of 2024, the redevelopment Maherchand Market is still ongoing.

== Overview ==
Meharchand Market is noted as a shopping hub. Shops in the market include designer stores, cafes, jewellery shops and salons. The market has also become known for its street art and murals.

== Location ==
Meharchand Market is located in Lodhi Colony and on the edge of Lutyens' Delhi. The market comes under the area of South Delhi.
