= Jor Bagh metro station =

Metro station in Delhi, India

Jor Bagh

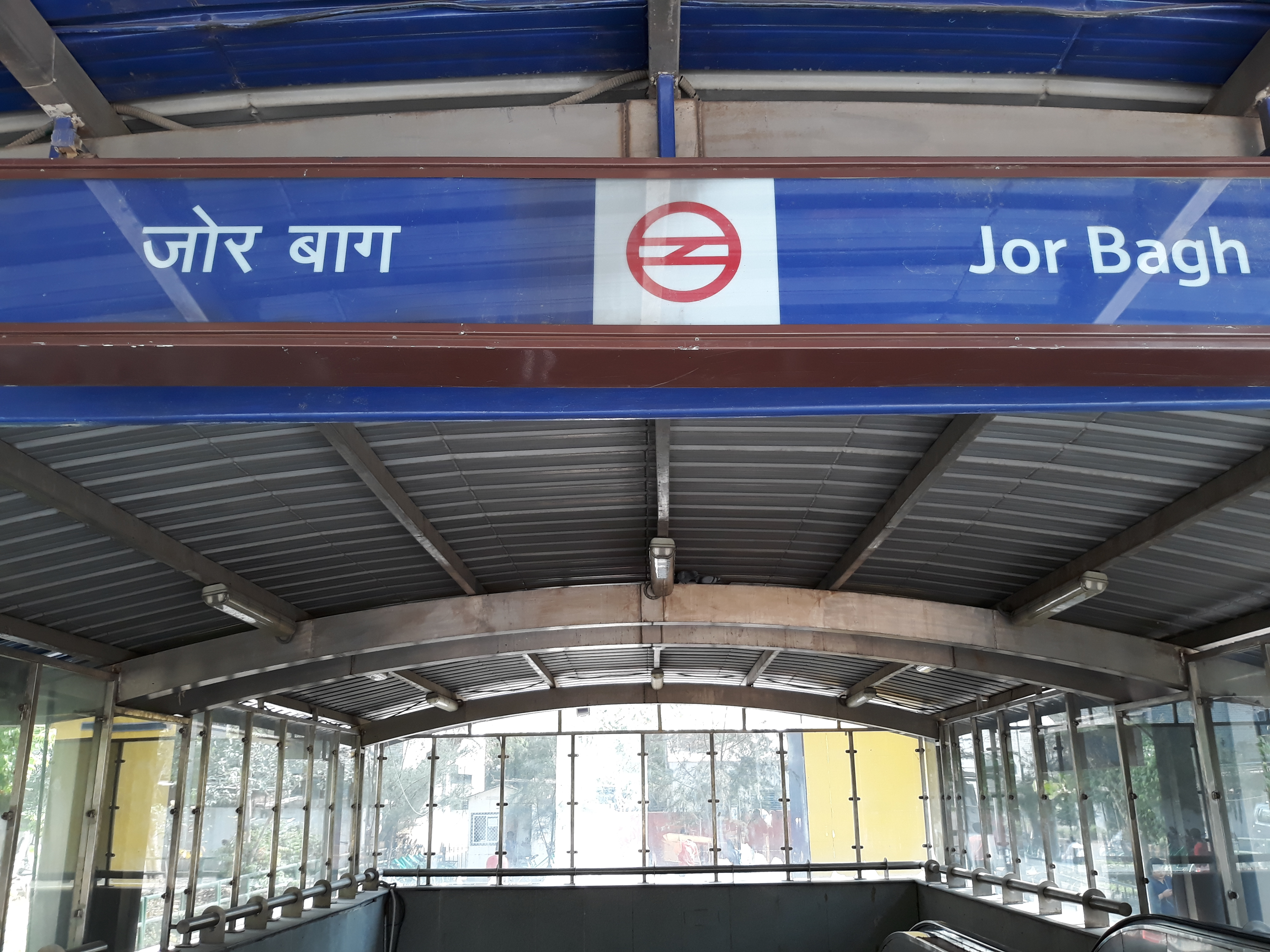

General information
- Location: Sri Aurobindo Marg, Jor Bagh, New Delhi, 110003; India
- Coordinates: 28°35′10″N 77°12′43″E
- System: Delhi Metro station
- Owner: Delhi Metro
- Operator: Delhi Metro Rail Corporation (DMRC)
- Line: Yellow Line
- Platforms: Island platform; Platform-1 → Millennium City Centre Gurugram; Platform-2 → Samaypur Badli
- Tracks: 2

Construction
- Structure type: Underground, Double-track
- Platform levels: 2
- Accessible: Yes

Other information
- Status: Staffed, Operational
- Station code: JB

History
- Opened: 3 September 2010; 15 years ago
- Electrified: 25 kV 50 Hz AC through overhead catenary

Services
Preceding station	Delhi Metro	Following station
Lok Kalyan Marg towards Samaypur Badli	Yellow Line	Dilli Haat - INA towards Millennium City Centre Gurugram
Route map
Location

The Jor Bagh metro station is located on the Yellow Line of the Delhi Metro.

It is the northernmost station on Aurobindo Marg, and is located near the Lodi Road crossing. A Mughal mausoleum, Safdarjung's Tomb, is located nearby. It is also close to Safdarjung Airport.

== Station layout ==
G	Street level	Exit/Entrance
C	Concourse	Fare control, station agent, Ticket/token, shops
P	Platform 1 Southbound	Towards → Millennium City Centre Gurugram; Next Station: Dilli Haat - INA Change at the next station for Pink Line
P	Island platform | Doors will open on the right
P	Platform 2 Northbound	Towards ← Samaypur Badli; Next Station: Lok Kalyan Marg

== Connections ==
=== Bus ===
Delhi Transport Corporation bus routes number 335, 336A, 344, 400, 433, 433CL, 433LnkSTL, 460, 460CL, 460STL, 480, 500, 502, 503, 505, 520, 540, 540CL, 548, 548CL, 548EXT, 578A,588, 605, 615, 621, 624ACL, 624ALinkSTL, 719, 725, 745, 794,878+578LT, AC-615, serves the station from nearby S.J. Madrasa bus stop.

== Artwork ==
In January 2015, Delhi Metro unveiled an exhibition from the archives of the Royals of Mewar at Jor Bagh. A tie-up between DMRC and India Habitat Centre, it was titled "The Habitat Initiative: Art in Public Spaces" and featured 18 portraits of the Maharanas of Udaipur.

== See also ==
- New Delhi
- List of Delhi Metro stations
- Transport in Delhi
- Delhi Metro Rail Corporation
- Delhi Suburban Railway
- Delhi Transport Corporation
- Central Delhi
- National Capital Region (India)
- List of rapid transit systems
- List of metro systems
