= Udyog Bhawan metro station =

Metro station in Delhi, India

Seva Teerth

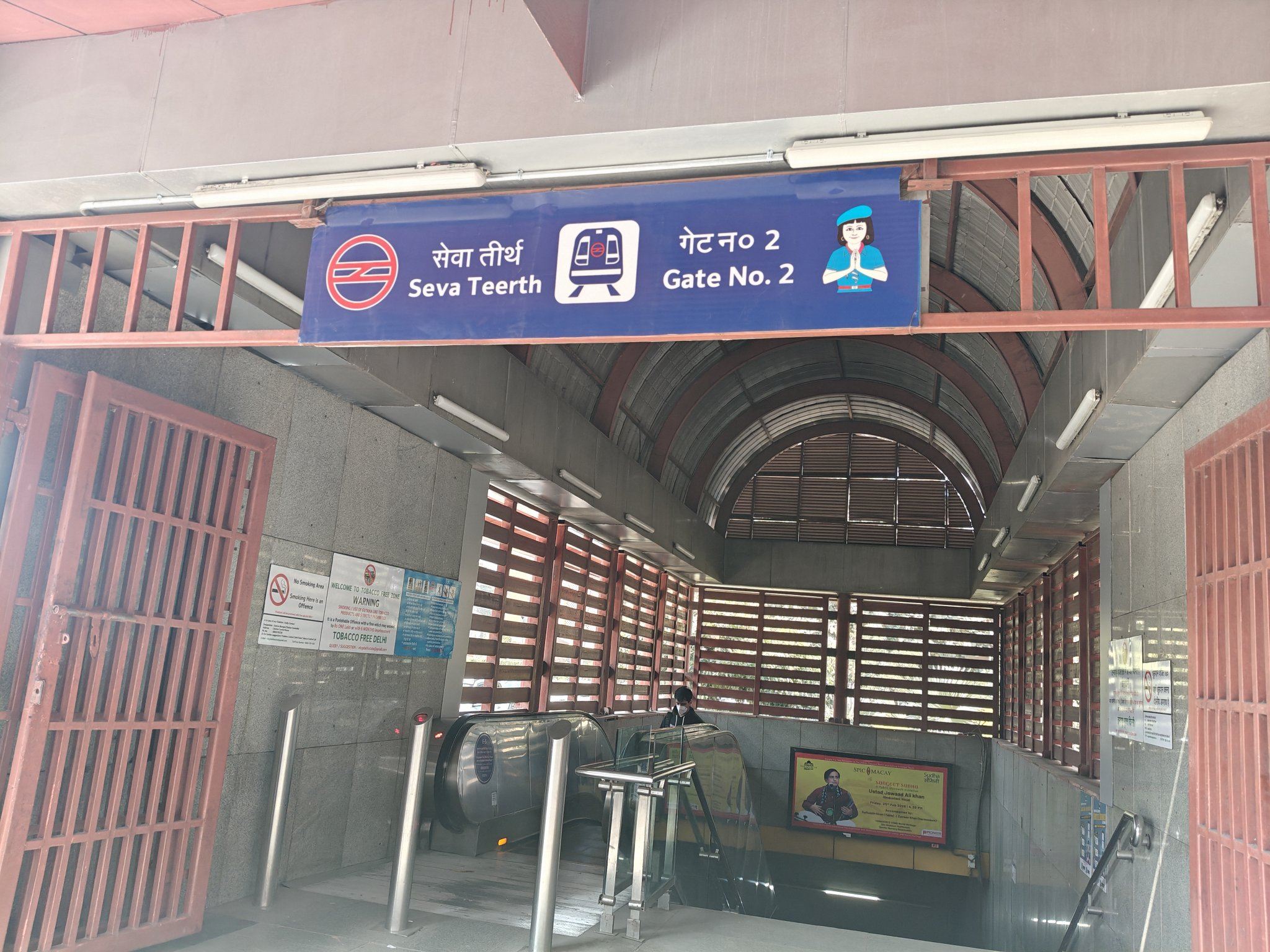

General information
- Location: Rafi Ahmed Kidwai Marg, Rajpath Area, Central Secretariat, New Delhi, 110001
- Coordinates: 28°36′40″N 77°12′43″E
- System: Delhi Metro station
- Owner: Delhi Metro
- Operator: Delhi Metro Rail Corporation (DMRC)
- Line: Yellow Line
- Platforms: Island platform; Platform-1 → Millennium City Centre Gurugram; Platform-2 → Samaypur Badli
- Tracks: 2

Construction
- Structure type: Underground, Double-track
- Platform levels: 2
- Accessible: Yes

Other information
- Status: Staffed, Operational
- Station code: UDB

History
- Opened: 3 September 2010; 16 years ago
- Electrified: 25 kV 50 Hz AC through overhead catenary

Services
Preceding station	Delhi Metro	Following station
Central Secretariat towards Samaypur Badli	Yellow Line	Lok Kalyan Marg towards Millennium City Centre Gurugram
Route map
Location

The Seva Teerth (formerly known as Udyog Bhawan) is a metro station on yellow line is located on the Yellow Line of the Delhi Metro.

Motilal Nehru Place and the National Museum, Janpath are located nearby.

The station was officially renamed from Udyog Bhawan to Seva Teerth on 14 February 2026.

== Station layout ==
G	Street Level	Exit/ Entrance
C	Concourse	Fare control, station agent, Ticket/token, shops
P	Platform 1 Southbound	Towards → Millennium City Centre Gurugram; Next Station: Lok Kalyan Marg
P	Island platform | Doors will open on the right
P	Platform 2 Northbound	Towards ← Samaypur Badli; Next Station: Central Secretariat Change at the next station for Violet Line

== Entry/exit ==
Udyog Bhawan station Entry/exits
Gate No-1	Gate No-2	Gate No-3	Gate No-4

== Connections ==
=== Bus ===
Delhi Transport Corporation bus routes number 433, 433CL, 460, 460CL, 480, 500, 520, 540, 548, 604, 610, 610A, 620, 630, 632, 680, 720, 725, 770ALT, 780, 781, AC-620, AC-781, serves the station from nearby Uduog Bhawan bus stop.

== See also ==
- New Delhi
- List of Delhi Metro stations
- Transport in Delhi
- Delhi Metro Rail Corporation
- Delhi Suburban Railway
- Delhi Transport Corporation
- Central Delhi
- National Capital Region (India)
- List of rapid transit systems
- List of metro systems
