= Racecourse station =

Racecourse station or Racecourse railway station may refer to:

- Aintree Racecourse station, Liverpool, England
- Albury Racecourse railway station, New South Wales, Australia
- Bundamba Racecourse railway station, Queensland, Australia
- Cheltenham Racecourse railway station, Adelaide, South Australia
- Cheltenham Racecourse railway station, Cheltenham, Gloucestershire, England
- Flemington Racecourse railway station, Melbourne, Australia
- Gawler Racecourse railway station, Adelaide, Australia
- Newbury Racecourse station, Newbury, Berkshire, England
- Race Course (Delhi Metro), Delhi, India
- Racecourse railway station (Brisbane), Ascot Racecourse, Brisbane, Australia
- Racecourse station (MTR), Sha Tin Racecourse, Hong Kong
- Warwick Farm Racecourse railway station, Sydney, Australia
- Werribee Racecourse railway station, Melbourne, Australia
- Wetherby Racecourse railway station, Wetherby, West Yorkshire, England
- Williamstown Racecourse railway station, Melbourne, Australia
