= Amrapali Museum =

Museum in Jaipur, India

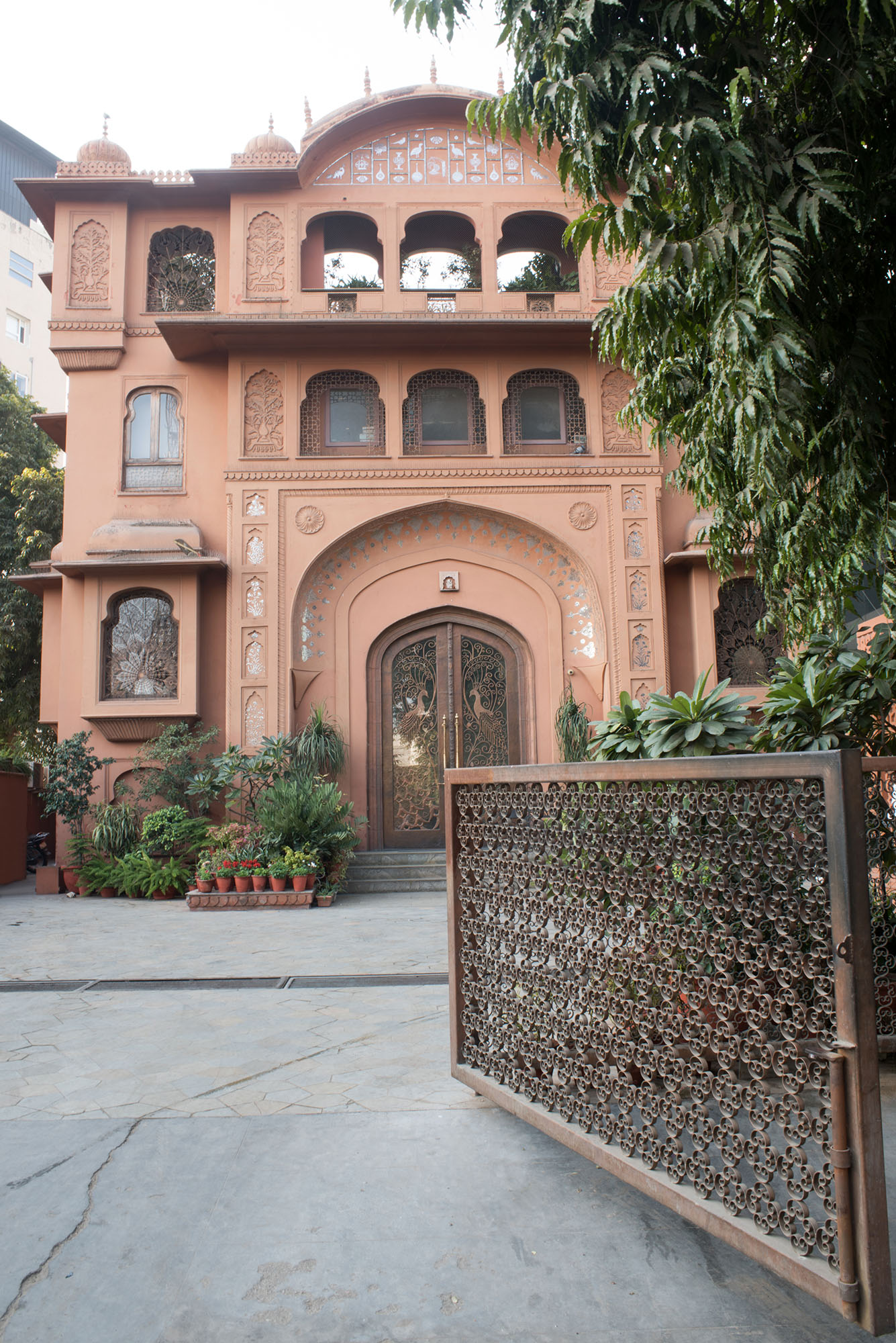
- Entrance of the museum
- Established: 20 January 2018
- Location: Jaipur, Rajasthan, India
- Coordinates: 26.91524°N 75.80142°E
- Type: Art museum
- Website: amrapalimuseum.com

Amrapali Museum is a museum located in Jaipur, Rajasthan, which is dedicated to Indian jewellery and decorative objects. It was inaugurated on 20 January 2018. The museum is an enterprise of the founders of Amrapali Jewels, Rajiv Arora and Rajesh Ajmera. Located in Jaipur at Ashok Marg, C-scheme, the museum premises are spread over 6,500 sq ft. It is also the office headquarters of Amrapali Jewels. The museum's collection has been arranged from the ground floor to the basement. It has a collection of 4,000 objects. Over 800 objects are displayed over two floors while the remaining objects are kept in visual storage.

The museum has fine jewellery, hand-crafted antiques, and exquisite curios to showcase the craftsmanship and rich tradition of Indian jewellery. Several different types of Indian jewellery at the museum constitute a visual representation of the history of art and the process of jewellery making. The collection ranges from tribal jewellery, in wood and metal, to silver and gold pieces. It is an extensive collection that shows how the traditional craftsmanship has impacted modern and contemporary design sensibilities.

== History ==
Amrapali Museum has resulted from the labour of its founders Rajiv Arora and Rajesh Ajmera. Rare jewellery pieces and other collectibles have been curated by the duo over a long span of over four decades. Arora and Ajmera were college friends with a common interest in historical, artistic handcrafted objects. They both lived in Jaipur, a city that boasted of a history of engagement with industrial arts in the 19th and 20th centuries. The great Jaipur Exhibition of 1883 had led to the establishment of the Albert Hall Museum in the city. Jaipur's connection with heritage and history became a natural inspiration for them. They travelled far and wide in India to collect pieces of art and heritage. During these travels, they saw that once common designs of jewellery were vanishing fast due to changing tastes. The metals were melted and reused and the vintage artistic pieces were lost forever. They started collecting the pieces to preserve the traditional aesthetics and founded Amrapali Jewels in 1978.

While they were collecting pieces out of general love of the art, for design inspiration and for business requirements, the idea of starting a museum had not crossed their minds. In their long journey, they had extensive interactions with craftsmen, silversmiths, art enthusiasts, scholars, and experts. They began to recognise the intrinsic value of art and felt a need to share the outcome of their pursuit with connoisseurs and lay public as a service to disseminate artistic sensibilities. Thus, Amrapali Museum opened in January 2018 after documentation and research of the collections. As a unique cultural heritage, it has garnered global attention for its collection and its many notable objects.

== Display and exhibits ==
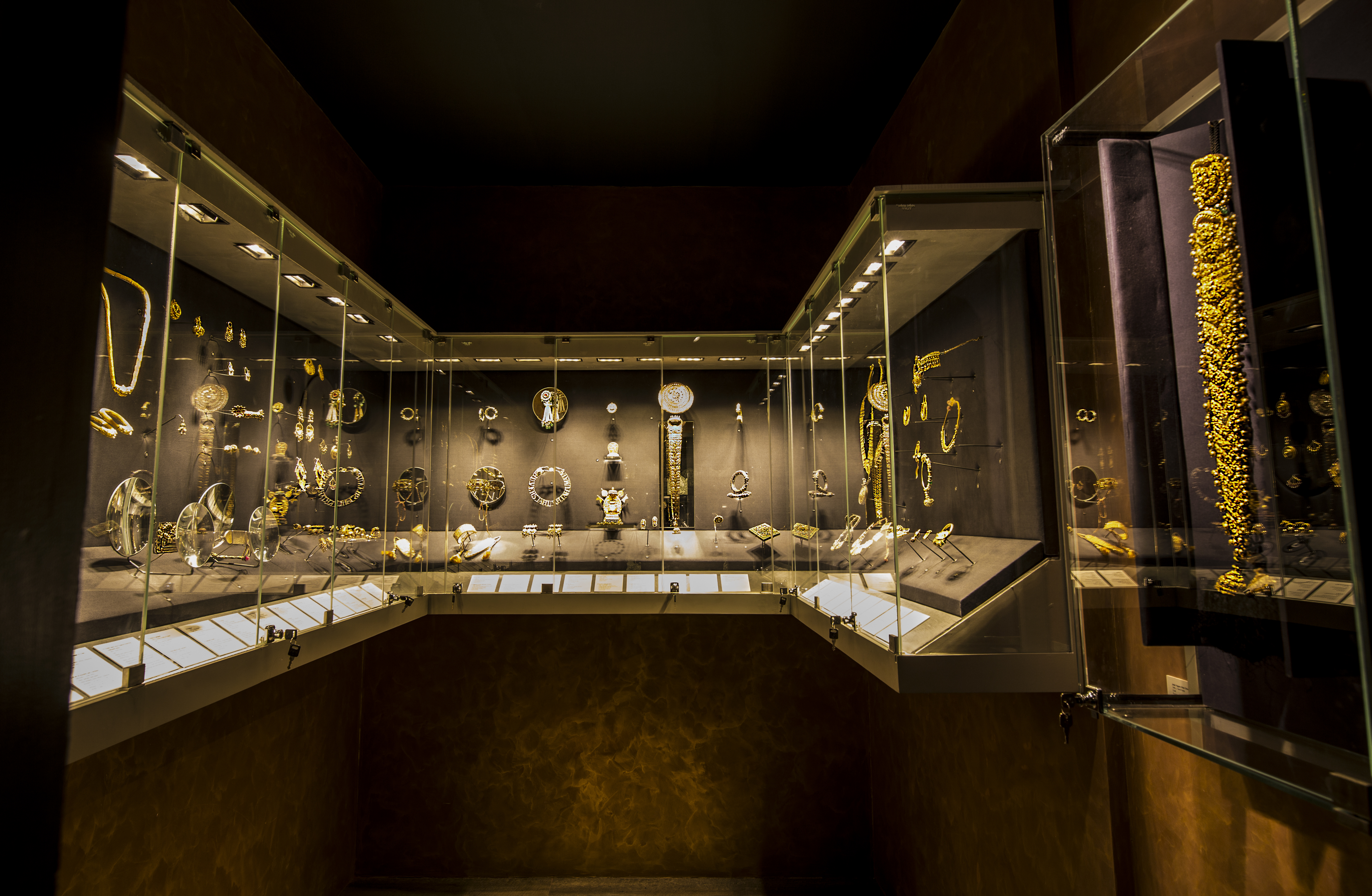
Display at Amrapali Museum, Jaipur

The display and exhibit has been designed to meet international standards. The use of concealed lighting illuminates each artefact in every niche. Instead of velvet fabric, grey fabric is used to neutralise the reflection of light because velvet is apprehended to gather dust. Lights are sparingly used in the museum and only when visitors are there to minimise damage through light. The space has been used very judiciously as many artefacts are placed in closed drawers. These drawers are customised to light up when they open noiselessly and illuminate the objects inside them. Care is taken to design the position of objects in such a way that the hooks on which they are suspended remain concealed. Sometimes a magnifying glass is placed behind an object to showcase the craftsmanship of both anterior and posterior sides for the visitors without disturbing the object. Audio guides and personal museum guides are also available.

== Collections ==
The museum is spread over two floors that are divided thematically into many different sections. The ground floor is arranged on the theme of beauty and adornment and focuses mainly on jewellery and ornaments. The section displays ornaments for all body parts - head to toe. While there are many pieces that belonged to the royal families or adorned deities in temples, many ornaments are from the tribal communities which they used in their everyday lives. Although the museum has a rich collection from Rajasthan almost all regions of India are represented adequately. The jewellery of different eras form a historical overview besides giving a perspective on the regional variations and community affiliation through jewellery. There are both silver and gold sections. Some remarkable objects, luxury items, decorative objects, and men's jewellery have also been displayed.

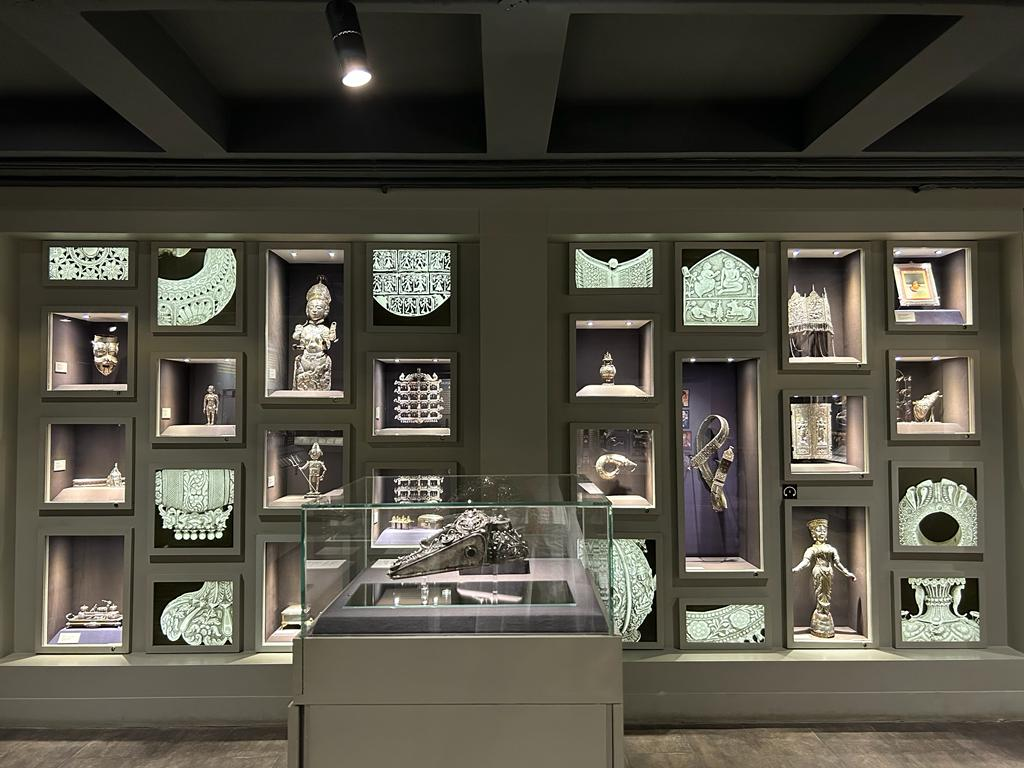
Collections, Amrapali Museum, Jaipur

The basement houses a collection that attempts to showcase design inspirations available to the Indian craftsmen. Several designs are displayed in jewellery and other silver objects of the collection. The genesis of terms and categories such as Tribal, Mughal, Rajput, Temple jewellery are illustrated through representative pieces. The museum presents a plethora of designs from the repertoire of Indian craftsmen that have evolved over time. Besides jewellery, the museum has a large collection of sundry silver objects ranging from utilitarian to decorative to luxurious items. Spittoons, rosewater sprinklers, and betel leaf sets are small objects; plates, tea sets, and assortments of boxes in every shape, size and type of craftsmanship are medium-sized objects; personal accessories as small as a toothpick are tiny, while elaborately made silver shoe covers are very heavy; and there is also a chariot covered with silver. All the objects seem to have been selected on the basis of their fine artistry irrespective of the size.

=== Notable objects ===
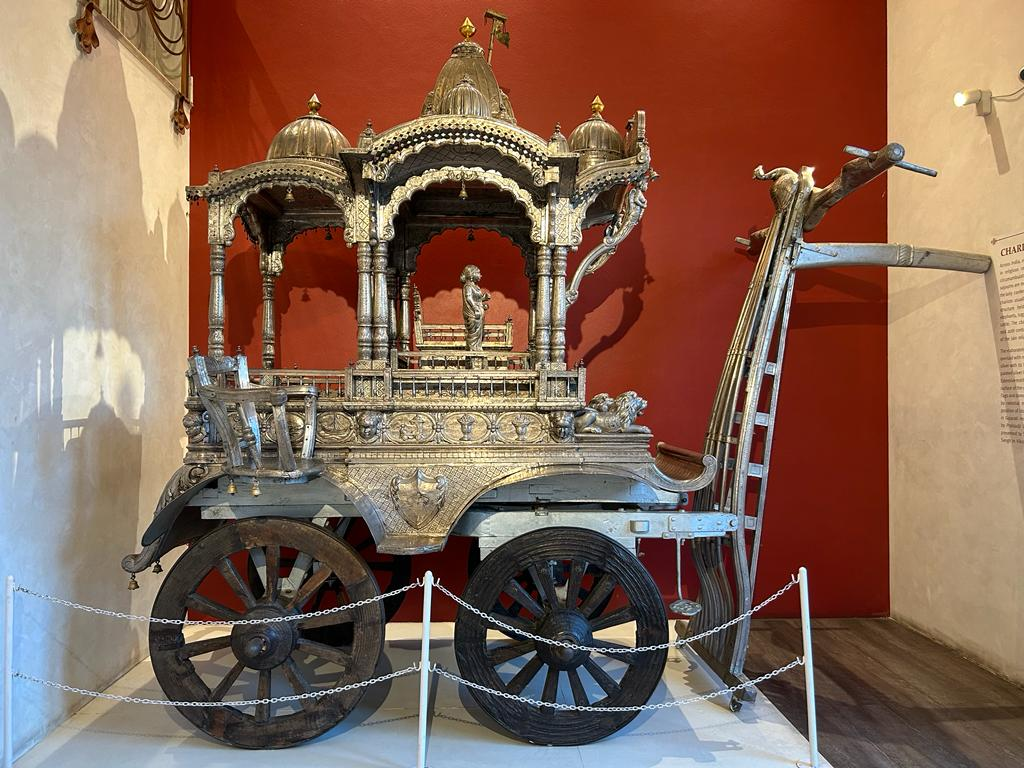
Jain Chariot, Amrapali Museum

At the entrance of the museum, a huge chariot, entirely enamelled with silver, is displayed. The chariot belongs to the mid 20th-century Gujarat and was used by followers of Jainism, perhaps, for religious processions. It has an elaborately carved wooden structure that is completely overlaid with sheets of silver. Extensive Jain iconography has been used in the motifs engraved on the surface of the chariot. As one enters the museum the first exhibit displays the equipments of the founders accompanied by the first object of this collection acquired by them. It is a betel leaf container (Pandan) made in silver and vetiver grass. It was procured from Bikaner region of Rajasthan. The grass kept the betel leaves aired so that they would not rot while the silver beautified the container. Towards the left is a highlight display where unique pieces from the collection have been displayed. Other notable objects include palanquin head from South India, silver inkpots, perfume container, oil lamp, holy water sprinkler along with a groom's head ornament from Himachal Pradesh.

=== Beauty and adornment section ===
The objects shown in this section have a wide range but are thematically linked to beauty and adornment. It contains many objects, mostly ornaments from all the regions of India. Jewellery objects very frequently were connected to rituals of marriage. They were either gifted during weddings, or worn – mostly by women after marriage as symbols of their status.

==== Silver ornaments ====
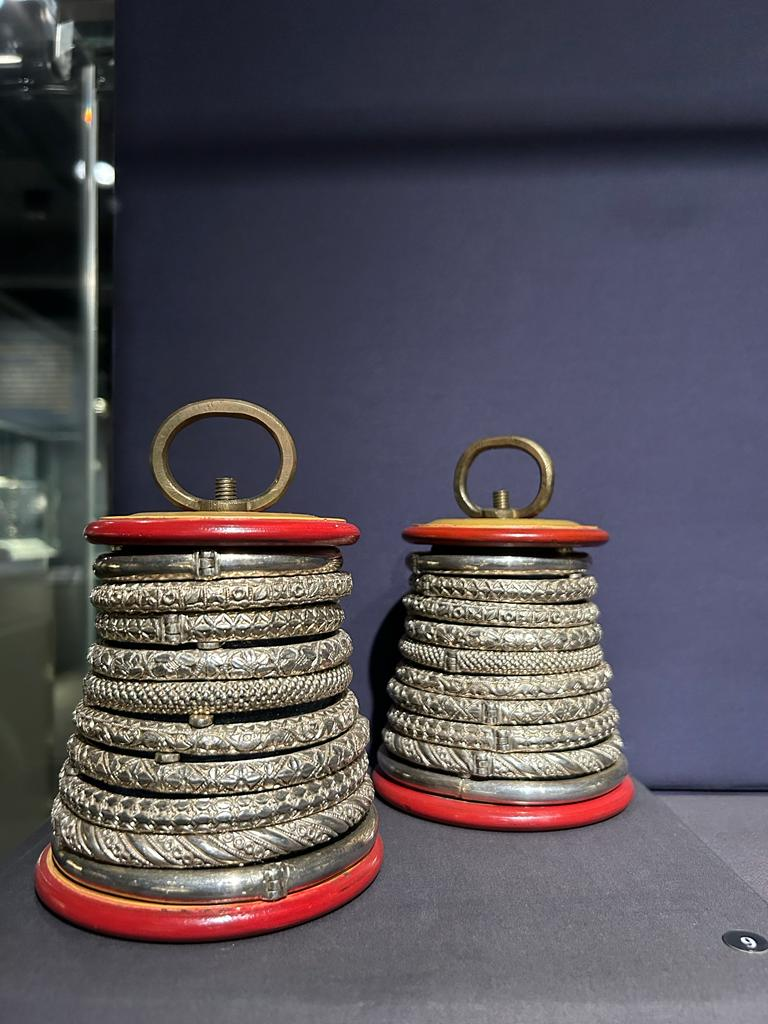
Silver Anklets (Kadiyan) of Rajasthan, Amrapali Museum

Many silver ornaments are showcased here that belong to different parts of India such as Ladakh, Karnataka, Orissa, regions of Rajasthan and so on, and to different communities. The tribal collection displays the cultural value given to jewellery in tribal and nomadic cultures. Ornaments were not just adornments but sources of wealth that could be easily carried and remained secure as part of one's attire. The exhibited ornaments have been curated to give a glimpse of the rich repertoire of types of ornaments that were used to bedeck the entire body from head to toe including ornaments for the head, ears, nose, neck, arms, waist, ankle and feet. The silver ornaments collection includes a 19th-century mirror work necklace in emerald green and white, a silver sehra (an ornament to be tied on a bridegroom's forehead) from Himachal Pradesh, hairpins, mathapattis (head ornaments in the form of bands, mostly for brides), karnaphools (earrings and ear cuffs), hastphools (hand jewellery), pair phools (foot jewellery), kamarband (cummerbund or waistband), bichwa (toe rings), naths (nose rings), kadas (bracelets), kangans (bangles), and borla (forehead ornaments) from Gujarat, Kutch, Ladakh, Himachal Pradesh, Karnataka and other places. They are fine examples of tribal as well as regional variations in Indian jewellery.

==== Gold ====
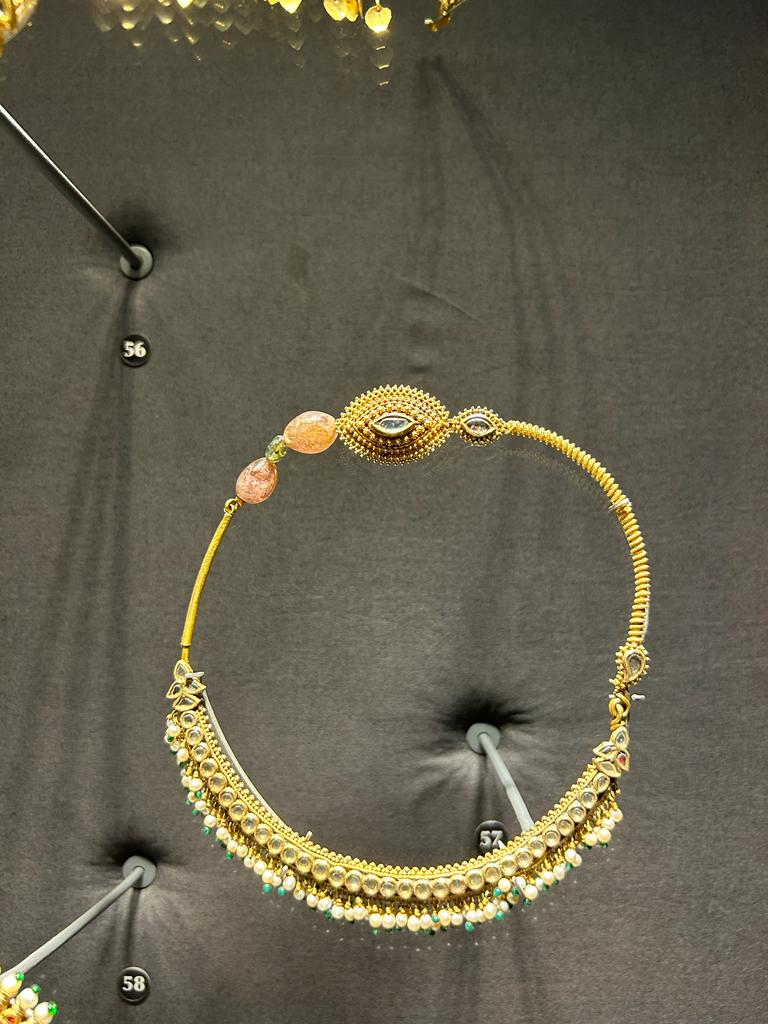
Gold Nath from Uttaranchal, Amrapali Museum

Even though the Amrapali collection is predominantly devoted to silver artefacts, gold objects displayed in this section represent the element of luxury and beautification of Indian jewellery. The jewellery worn by the members of royal families brings to life the opulence and grandeur of the era of Maharajas and Maharanis. A unique section of God jewellery represents the jewellery worn by deities in temples across India. Jewellery from south predominate the gold section with traditional necklace, Hansli, from Karnataka and diamond-studded armlets of Hyderabad or precious stones embedded hair ornaments of Tamil Nadu. A Parsi necklace with diamond inlay is quite notable with the sacred Parsi words included in its design. The 1929 necklace has diamond inlaid words that read Humata Hukhta Hversta which means Good thoughts, good words, good deeds.

==== Men's jewellery ====
Although jewellery is usually associated with women, many tribal pieces were unisex or belonged to men. Many uniquely male jewellery is also exhibited in the museum. For instance an ornament called turra and another called kalangi adorned the turbans of powerful men. Silver sehras were used to enhance the headgear of groom.

==== Hookahs ====
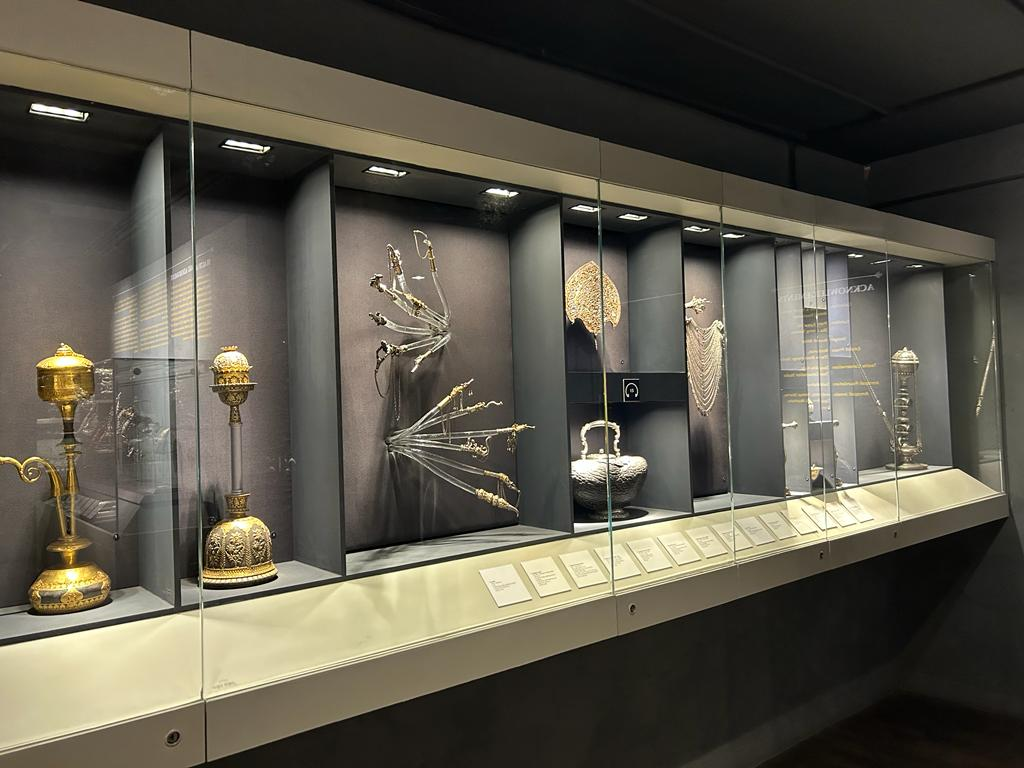
Hookahs, Amrapali Museum

In the last section, is displayed a collection of Mughal inspired hookahs, made from both gold and silver. The diversity of the hookah mouthpiece designs, highlight the varied preferences and ideas of patrons, skillfully executed by the artists. They are locally called mukhnaals and consist of many unique designs.

=== Journey of Design section ===
The basement section is dedicated to showcase the range of designs in the Indian artistry and its application by the craftsmen.

==== Religious objects ====
This section has been divided into two parts - Jainism and Hinduism. The first one displays outer covering for the sacred statue of Jainism's 11th tirthankara – Shreyansnath. He can be identified because of his emblem rhinoceros in the center of plinth. It is made with the plinth in Padmasana. It also shows 14 dreams of Mother Trishala. It is an elaborate work of Jain art that shows many mythological iconographic featutres. The other section displays Mukhalingams and a range of objects made for the Gods including elements of shrines and temples, utensils used in worship, jewellery used for deities, and the statues of deities themselves. Some special pieces include gold and turquoise necklace of Lord Jagannath, pendant of necklace Shrinathji (revered Nathdwara deity of Udaipur region) and a gold covered Jain religious manuscript.

==== Personal accessories ====
This section displays several accessory containers shaped in varying mango and fish forms. Mango shaped containers are mainly used as lime containers and fish shaped containers to store kohl for the eyes. Mangoes and fish have remained in use as traditional designs in many jewellery forms. It also displays eclectic buttons, mojaris, boxes and containers of all shapes and sizes for storing an entire paan kit, toiletry kits for grooming such as ear and tongue cleaners and more. A wine flask (chuski) is shaped in the form of two entwined women in silver over a bison horn whose hollow was used to fill wine.

==== Textiles ====
A separate section is dedicated to heirloom textiles that are embellished with gold and silver to show the use of gold and silver in textiles. The textiles are mounted on the walls and display rich specimens of Pichwai and Kalamkari heirloom textiles. Many of the textile pieces have been embellished with traditional embroidery in gold and silver like salma sitara, zari, zardozi etc. Extra care has been taken to keep this part of the museum dimly lit as harsh light can be detrimental to the longevity of fabrics.

==== Visual storage ====
The museum has kept its reserve collections in a visual store, effectively making everything available for visitors to see.

== Testimonials and publications ==
Many prominent personalities and celebrities have visited the Amrapali Museum and shown their appreciation such as Shashi Tharoor, Siddhi Kumari, Alex Popov etc. Mythologist Devdutt Pattanaik has authored a book based on the objects of the Amrapali Museum titled The Adornment of Gods - Rare Objects from the Amrapali Jewels Museum. Pattanaik has written about the complex embedded meanings of the museum objects. The museum has published a small brochure and a detailed catalogue in the form of a coffee table book to document and present the details of many exquisite pieces.

== Selected objects ==
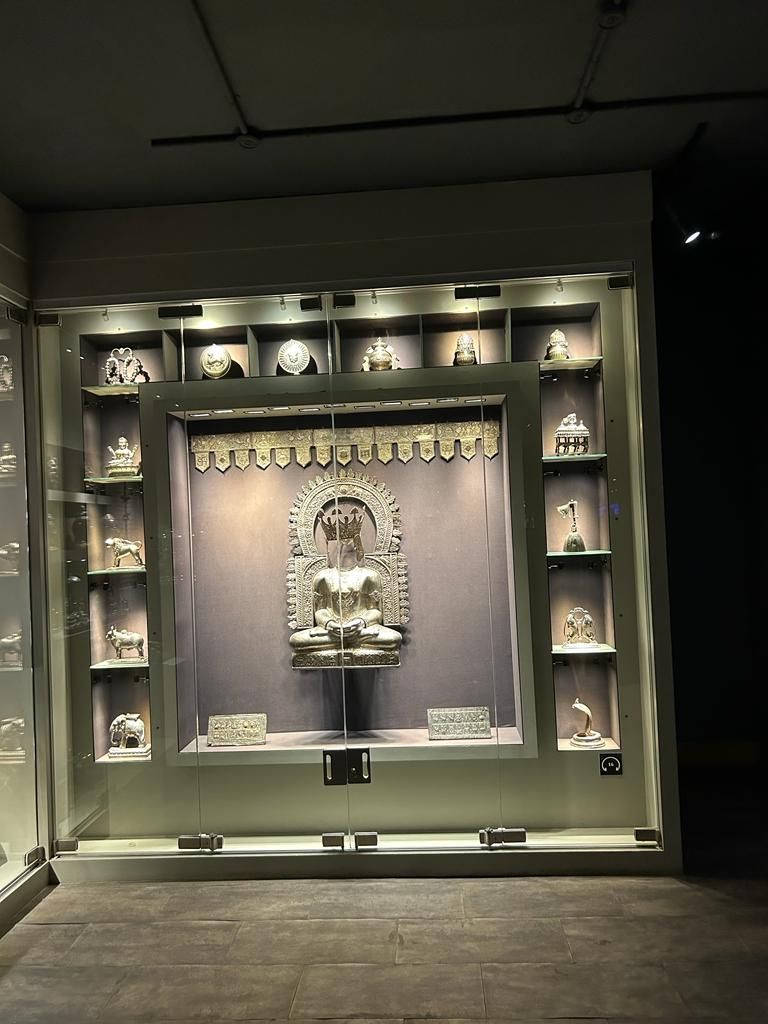
God Jewellery, Amrapali Museum

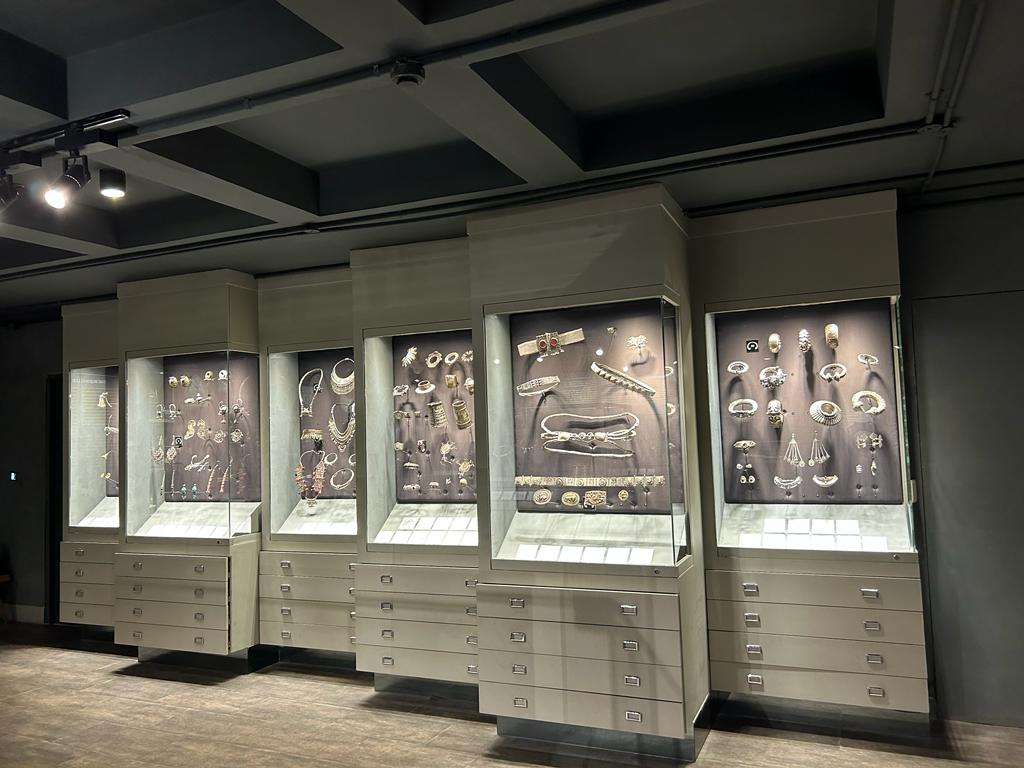
Display with in-lit Drawers, Amrapali Museum

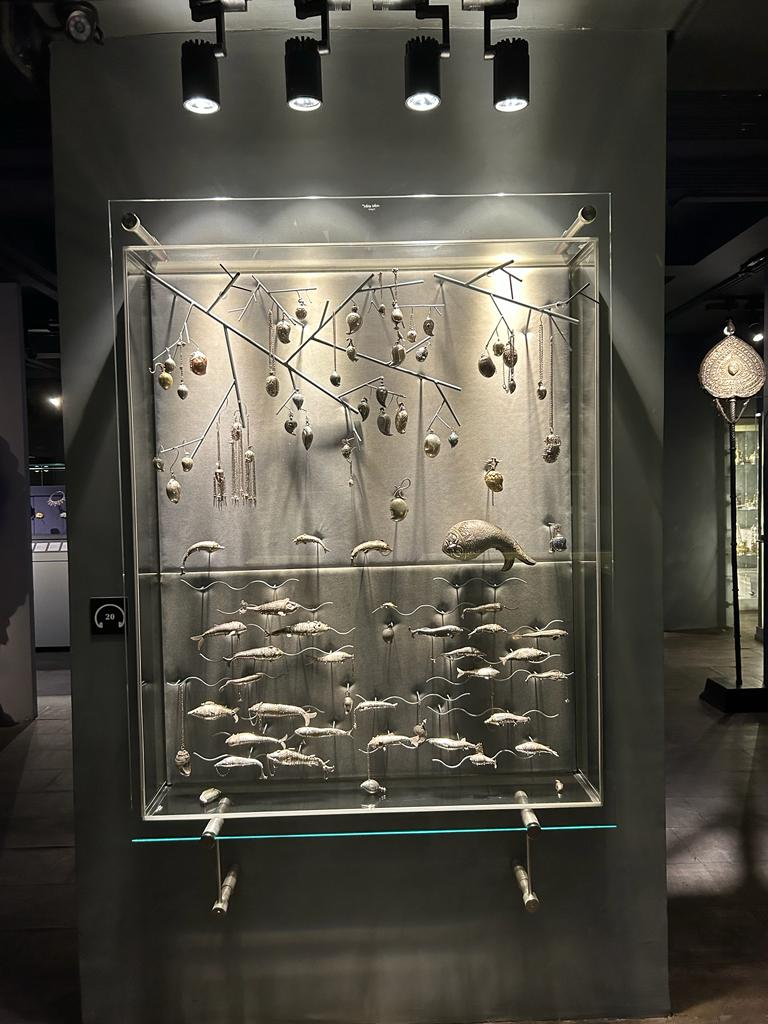
Fish-Shaped Design in Jewellery, Amrapali Museum

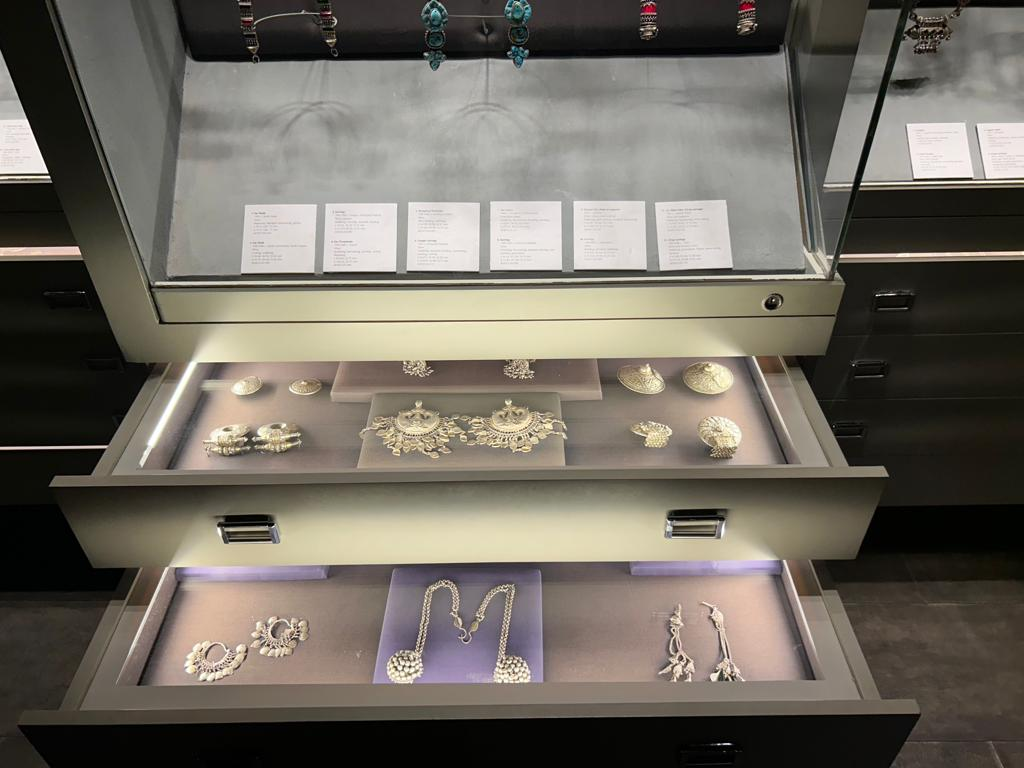
In-lit Drawer Display, Amrapali Museum

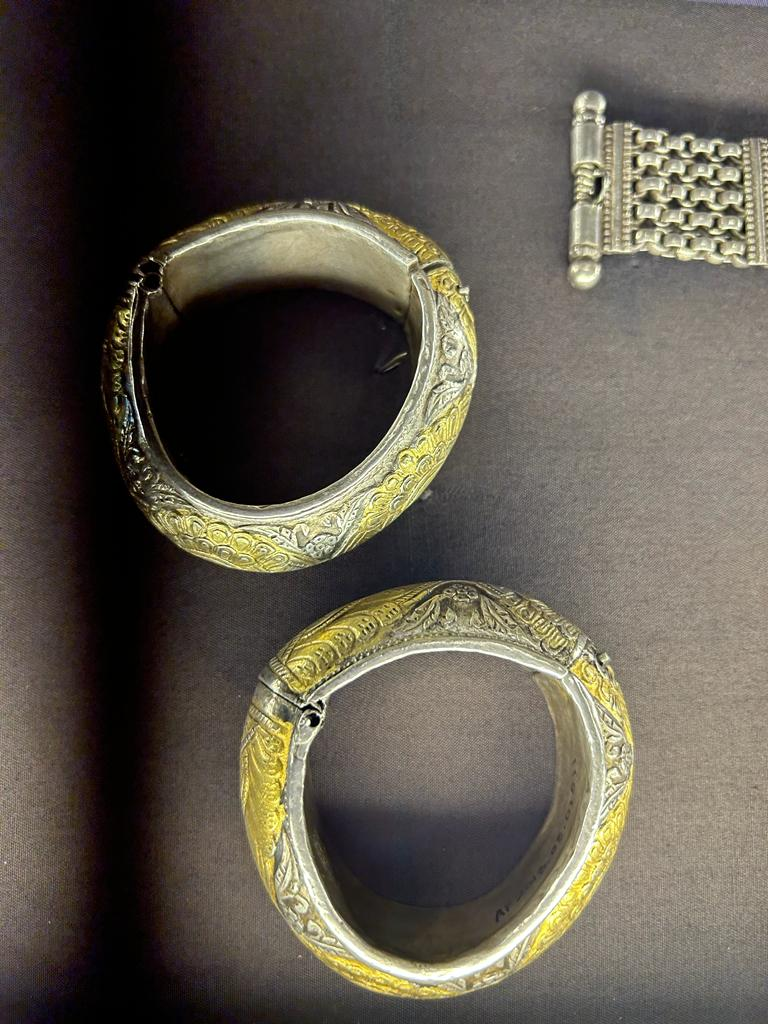
Bracelets from Assam, Amrapali Museum

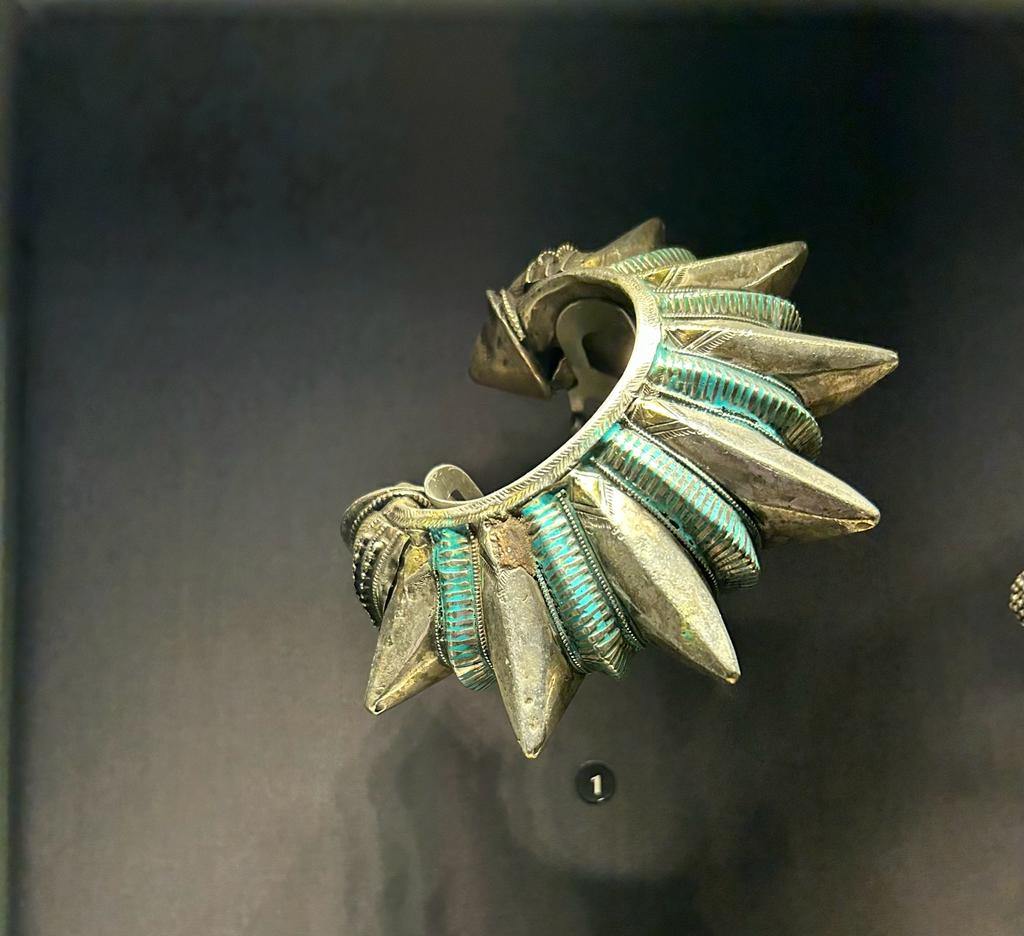
Silver Enamel Bracelet, Amrapali Museum

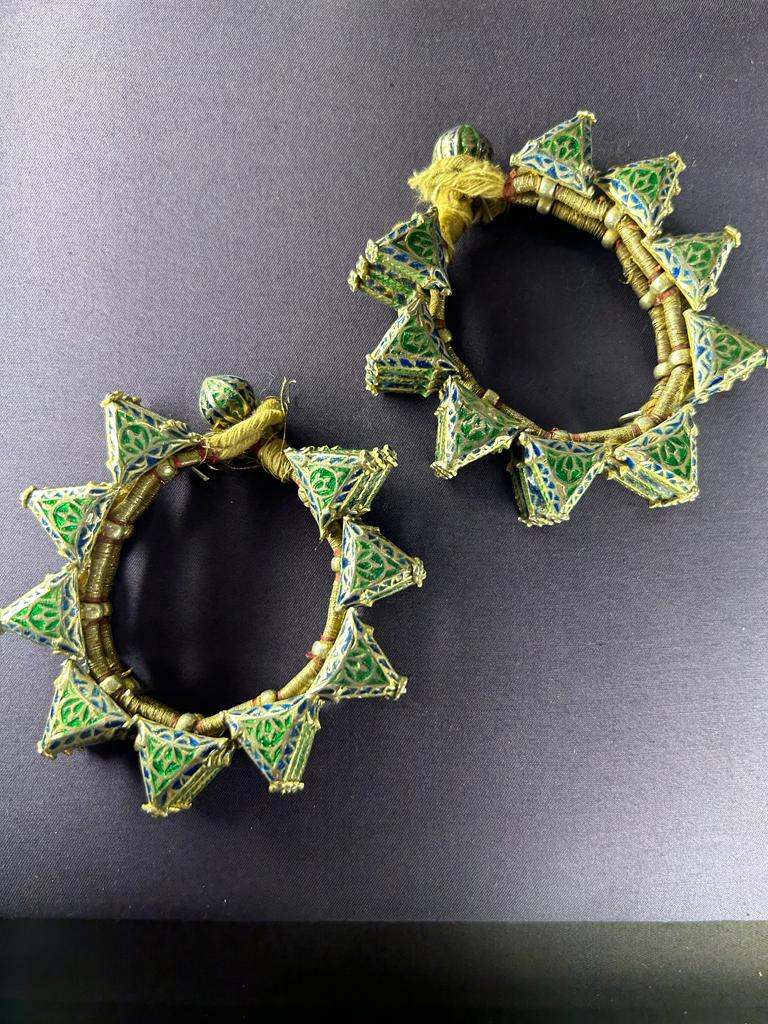
Enamelled Bracelets, Amrapali Museum

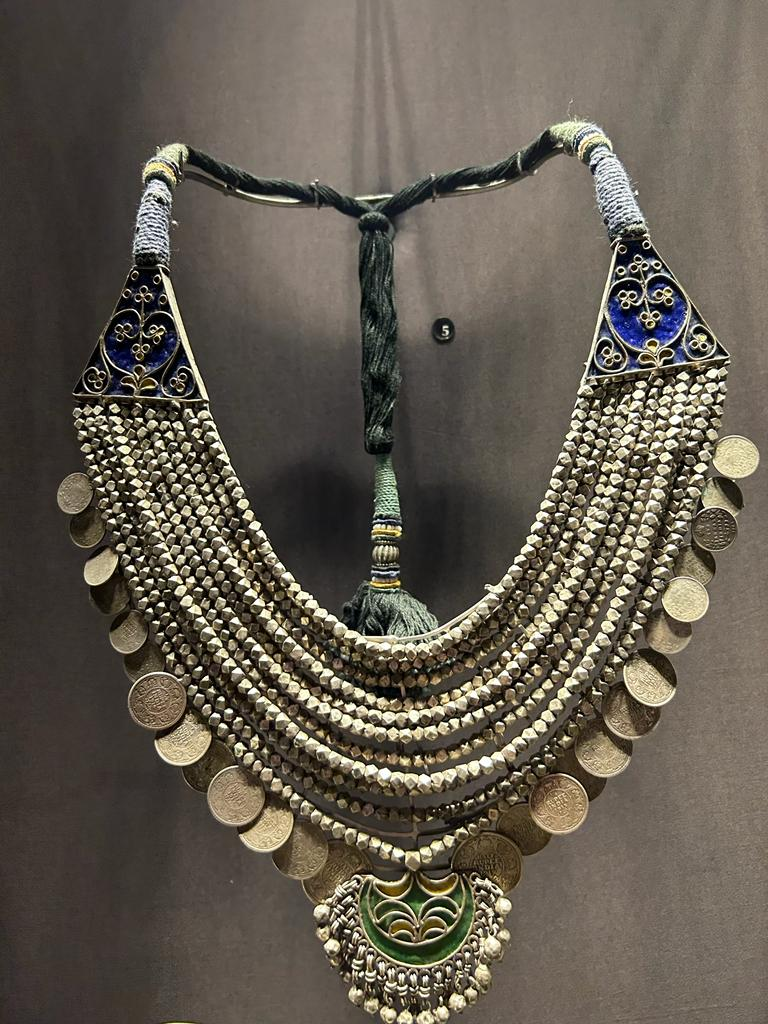
Silver Necklace from Himachal Pradesh, Amrapali Museum

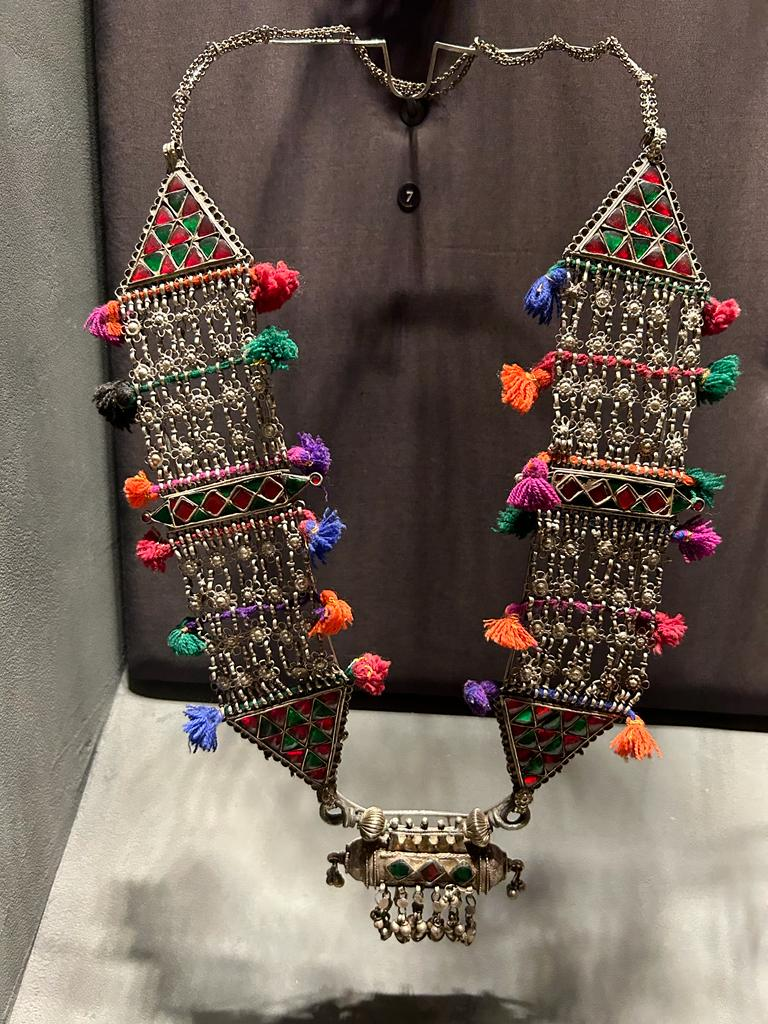
Necklace from Jaiselmer, Amraplai Museum

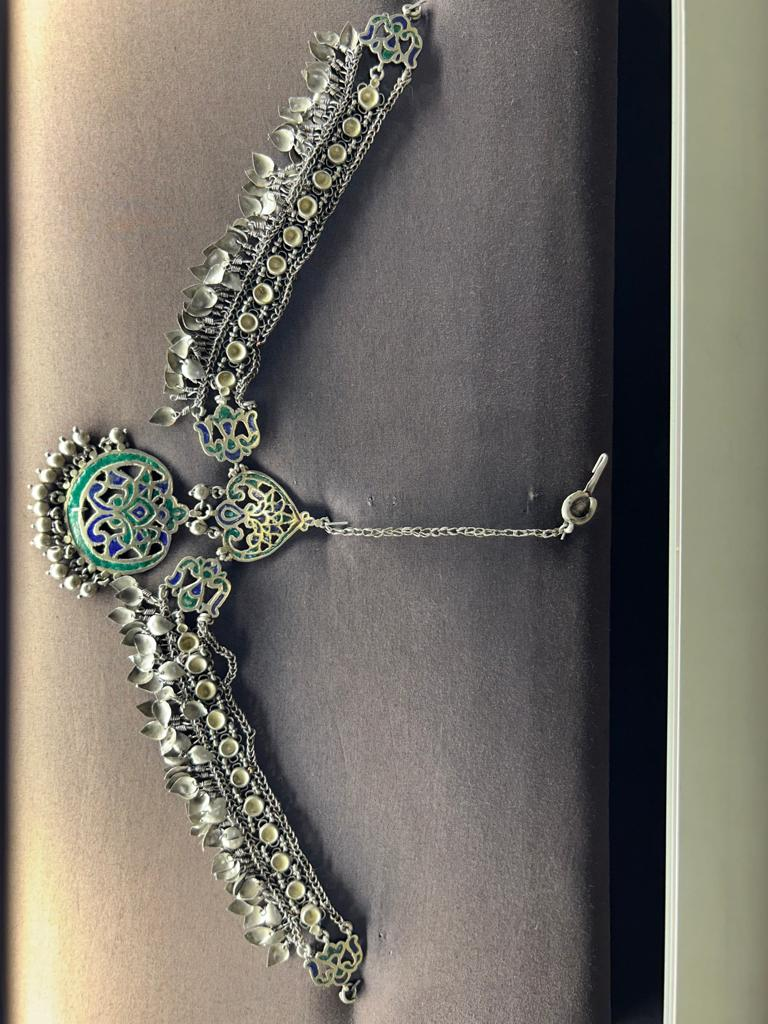
Silver enamelled Mathapatti from Himachal Pradesh, Amrapali Museum

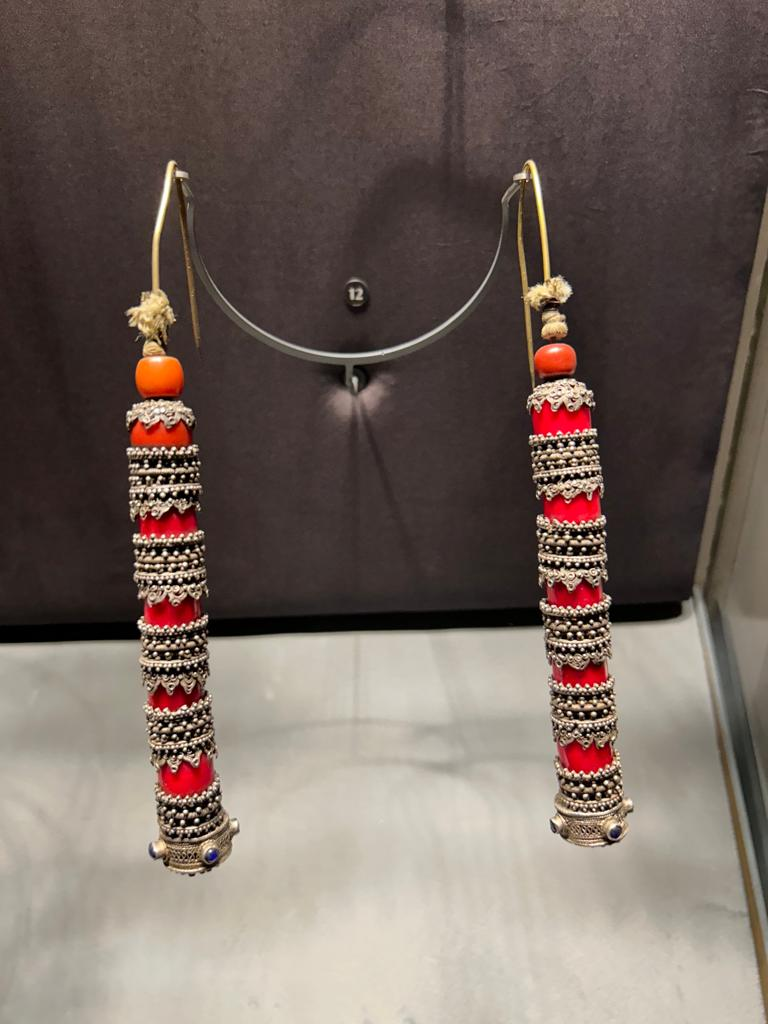
Silver and Bamboo Coral Earrings from Ladakh or Tibet, Amrapali Museum

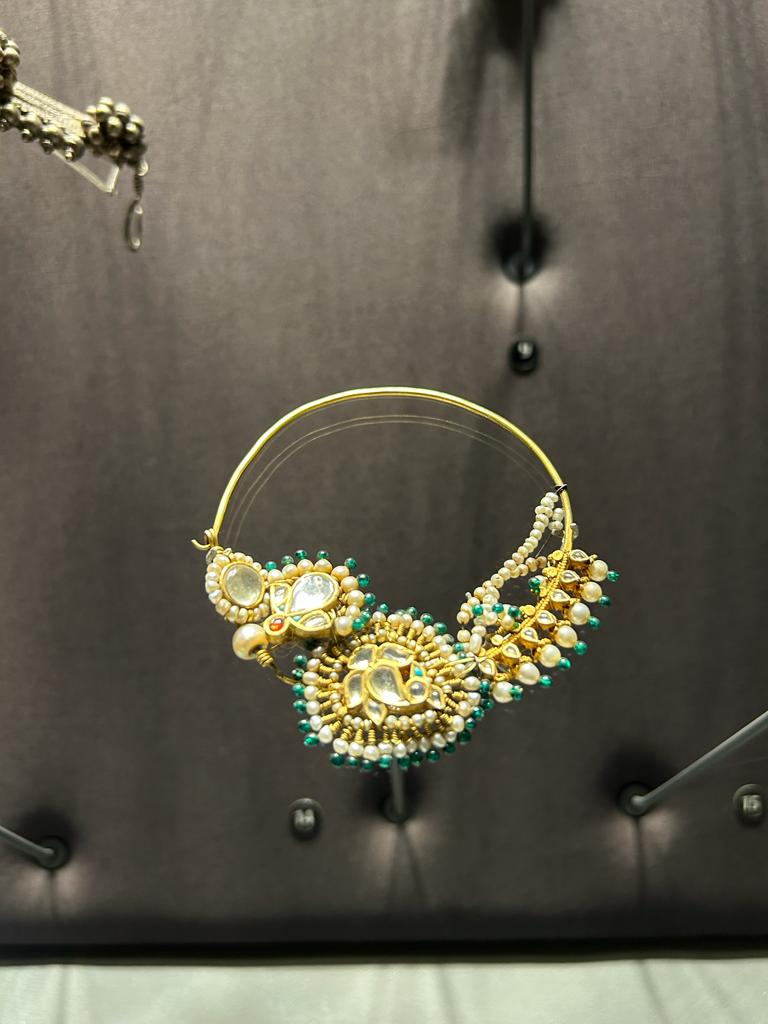
Gold nose ring from Rajasthan, Amrapali Museum

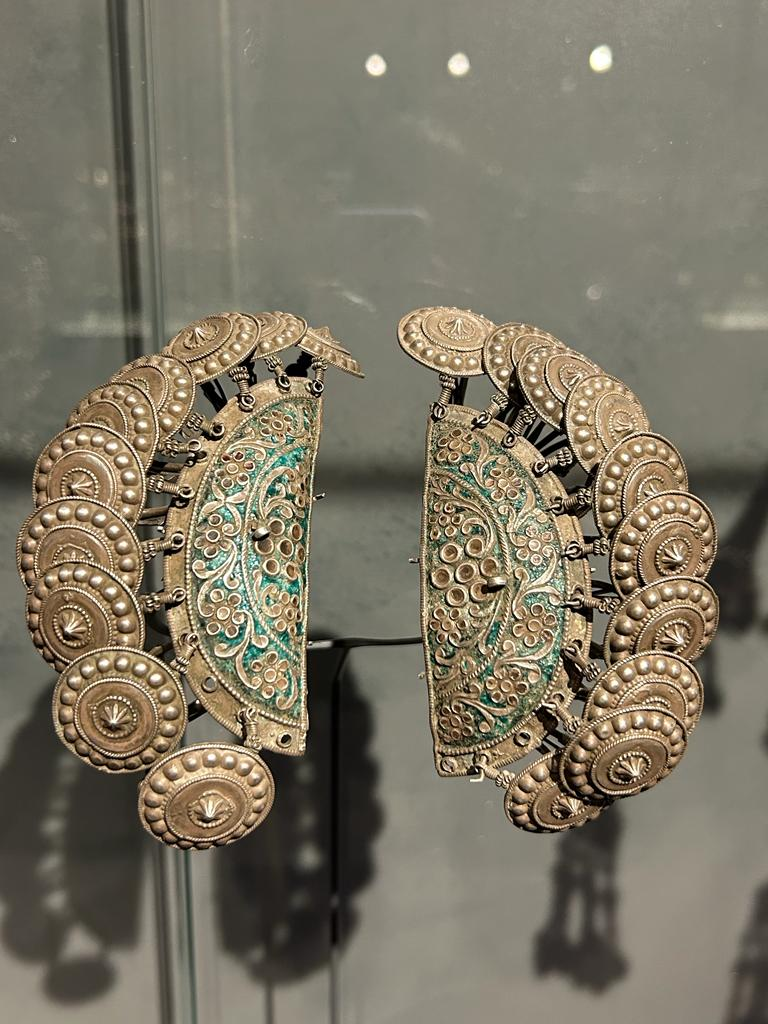
Silver and enamelled earcovers from Chamba, Himachal Pradesh, Amrapali Museum

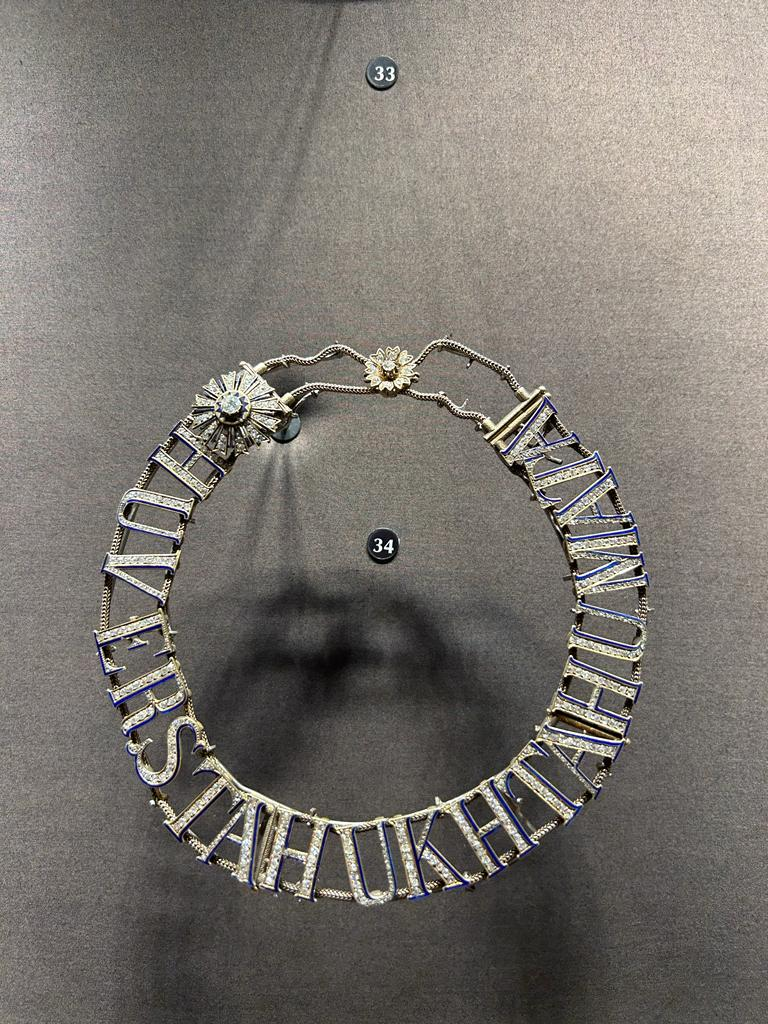
Parsi Necklace, Amrapali Museum
