= Racecourse Ground (disambiguation) =

The Racecourse Ground is a football stadium in Wrexham, Wales.

It may also refer to these stadia in England:

- County Cricket Ground, Derby, East Midlands
- Racecourse Ground, Hereford, West Midlands
- The Racecourse, Durham University cricket ground, North East England
- Racecourse Ground, Swaffham, Norfolk, East Anglia
- Race Course Maidan (lit. 'Race Course Ground'), Dhaka, Bangladesh

== See also ==
- Racecourse (disambiguation)
