= Lodhi Colony =

- Neighborhood of Delhi
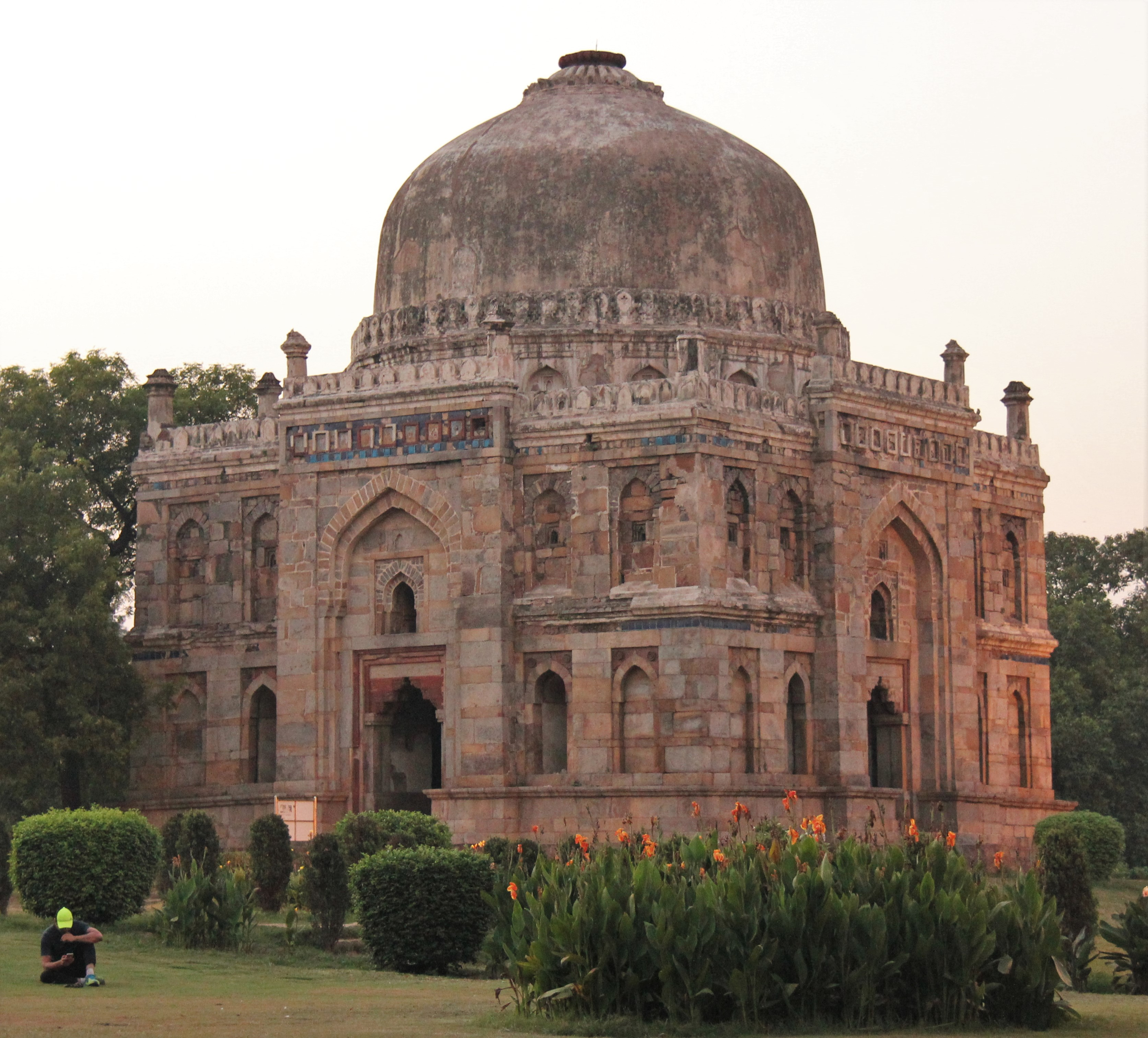
- Shisha Gumbad in nearby Lodhi Gardens after which the colony was named

- Location in Delhi, India
- Coordinates: 28°34′57″N 77°13′25″E
- Country: India
- State: Delhi
- District: New Delhi

Government
  - Body: New Delhi Municipal Council

Languages
  - Official: Hindi, English
- Time zone: UTC+5:30 (IST)
- PIN: 110003

Lodhi Colony (Spelling variants:Lodi Colony) (Hindi: लोधी कॉलोनी) is a Central Government Officers and Staff Residential Colony in South Central part of New Delhi, built in the 1940s, and lies adjacent to the Lodhi Gardens and Lodhi Road.

== History ==
Built in 1940s, to house government employees, with bungalows for senior officials in the nearby Lodhi Estate area. it was one of the last residential areas built during the British Raj.

== Education ==
Lodhi Colony has several centres for higher education nearby, such as the All India Management Association (AIMA) institute, the Alliance Française de Delhi and a south-campus Delhi University college - the Dyal Singh College. There are also private schools such as Kendriya Vidyalaya Pragati Vihar, Air Force Bal Bharati School and The Banyan Tree School besides various state schools.

== Visitor's attractions ==
There are several places to visit in the vicinity such as the Sai Baba Temple of Lodhi Road, Ram Mandir at Bhishmah Pitamahah Marg, India Habitat Centre, Najaf Khan's Tomb and Jawaharlal Nehru Stadium. Lodhi Garden is also very near and is one of the most popular gardens in New Delhi among morning walkers and joggers.

The four main shopping markets in this area are Jorbagh Market, Khanna Market and Meharchand Market and Main Market. Chocolate Wheel Confectionery in the Jor Bagh area is a popular bakery from which Rajiv Gandhi used to buy cakes.

Over 14 artists across the globe were commissioned to paint the walls of Lodhi Colony making it an India's first open-air art district.

== See also ==
- Lodhi Art District
- Lodi Gardens
- Lodhi Road
