= Amrapali Jewels =

Indian jewelry company

- Type: Private limited company
- Industry: Gems & Jewellery
- Founded: 1978
- Founder: Rajiv Arora and Rajesh Ajmera
- Headquarters: Jaipur, India
- Area served: Worldwide
- Key people: Rajiv Arora; Rajesh Ajmera; Tarang Arora & Akanksha Arora
- Products: Jewelry & Accessories
- Website: Official website

Amrapali Jewels is a jewellery house founded in 1978 by Rajiv Arora and Rajesh Ajmera in Jaipur. Amrapali designs, produces and distributes tribal, fine and uncut gemstone jewellery. The brand has stores in India and London. The brand also operates a museum of Indian jewellery in Jaipur.

== Historical background ==
Amrapali Jewels was founded by Rajiv Arora and Rajesh Ajmera, who studied subjects related to ancient Indian culture during their graduate education.

In January 2025, House of Masaba and Amrapali Jewels jointly launched a fine jewellery collection. Tribe Amrapali, a subsidiary of Amrapali Jewels, had previously collaborated with designer Masaba Gupta on the Ghana Ghana collection.

== Indian jewellery museum ==
The brand operates an Amrapali Museum of Jewellery, spread over a 6,500 square feet (600 m^{2}) space and showcasing traditional Indian Jewellery in the city of Jaipur. The collection took 50 years to be gathered.

== Income Tax Department raid ==
On 13 July 2020, the I.T. Department raided Amrapali Jewels and its owner Rajiv Arora, who is a close aide of Congress CM, Ashok Gehlot and Vice President of the Rajasthan Pradesh Congress Committee for tax evasion at various locations, including Mumbai and Delhi.

There was also a case in 2015 registered against Amrapali Jewels regarding bogus purchases of precious and semi-precious stones.
