= Race Course, Jamaica =

Human settlement in Jamaica

Coordinates: 17.832°N 77.280°W

Location of Race Course in Jamaica

Race Course is a settlement in Clarendon Parish in Jamaica. It has a population of 3,003 as of 2009. It is 34 mi (or 55 km) west of Kingston, Jamaica, the capital city.
