= Race Course, Vadodara =

Coordinates: 22.3115°N 73.16152°E

Race Course is an area in the western side of Vadodara City in the state of Gujarat in India. It is one of the fastest growing western part of Vadodara. During the olden days, it was a home to one of the only Race Course in western India owned by Maharajas of Vadodara.
