= Lok Kalyan Marg metro station =

Metro station in Delhi, India

Lok Kalyan Marg

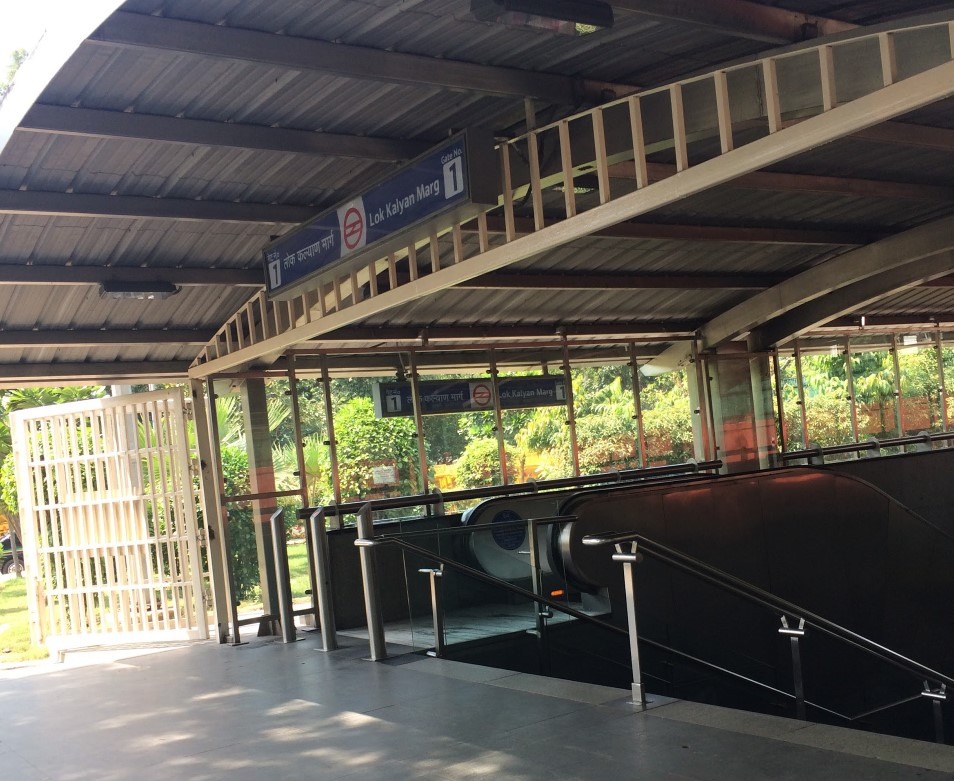

General information
- Location: Race Course Road, New Delhi, Delhi - 110011
- Coordinates: 28°35′52″N 77°12′40″E
- System: Delhi Metro station
- Owner: Delhi Metro
- Operator: Delhi Metro Rail Corporation (DMRC)
- Line: Yellow Line
- Platforms: Island platform; Platform-1 → Millennium City Centre Gurugram; Platform-2 → Samaypur Badli
- Tracks: 2

Construction
- Structure type: Underground, Double-track
- Platform levels: 2
- Accessible: Yes

Other information
- Status: Staffed, Operational
- Station code: LKM

History
- Opened: 3 September 2010; 16 years ago
- Electrified: 25 kV 50 Hz AC through overhead catenary

Services
Preceding station	Delhi Metro	Following station
Seva Teerth towards Samaypur Badli	Yellow Line	Jor Bagh towards Millennium City Centre Gurugram
Route map
Location

The Lok Kalyan Marg metro station, formerly known as the Race Course metro station, is located on the Yellow Line of the Delhi Metro. It serves the Race Course Road area in New Delhi, and the Prime Minister's official residence, 7, Race Course Road, is located nearby.

== History ==
The Lok Kalyan Marg metro station is located very close to the Tughlak Road police station, which is the place where two very historical FIRs for the assassination of Mahatma Gandhi and Indira Gandhi were registered. Originally called the Race Course metro station, it was renamed when the accompanying road was given its current name in 2016.

== Station layout ==
G	Street Level	Exit/ Entrance
C	Concourse	Fare control, station agent, Ticket/token, shops
P	Platform 1 Southbound	Towards → Millennium City Centre Gurugram; Next Station: Jor Bagh
P	Island platform | Doors will open on the right
P	Platform 2 Northbound	Towards ← Samaypur Badli; Next Station: Seva Teerth

== Connections ==
=== Bus ===
Delhi Transport Corporation bus routes number 433, 433CL, 433LnkSTL, 460, 460CL, 460STL, 480, 500, 520, 540, 540CL, 548, 548CL, 548EXT, 610, 610A, 725, 780, 781, 990B, AC-781, serves the station from nearby P.S. Tughlaq Road bus stop.

== See also ==
- New Delhi
- List of Delhi Metro stations
- Transport in Delhi
- Delhi Metro Rail Corporation
- Delhi Suburban Railway
- Delhi Transport Corporation
- Central Delhi
- National Capital Region (India)
- List of rapid transit systems
- List of metro systems
