= Lodhi Art District =

Art district in New Delhi, India

- Type: Mural
- Location: 28°39′21″N 77°14′27″E
- Country: India
- State: New Delhi
- Area: Lodhi Colony
- Pincode: 110003

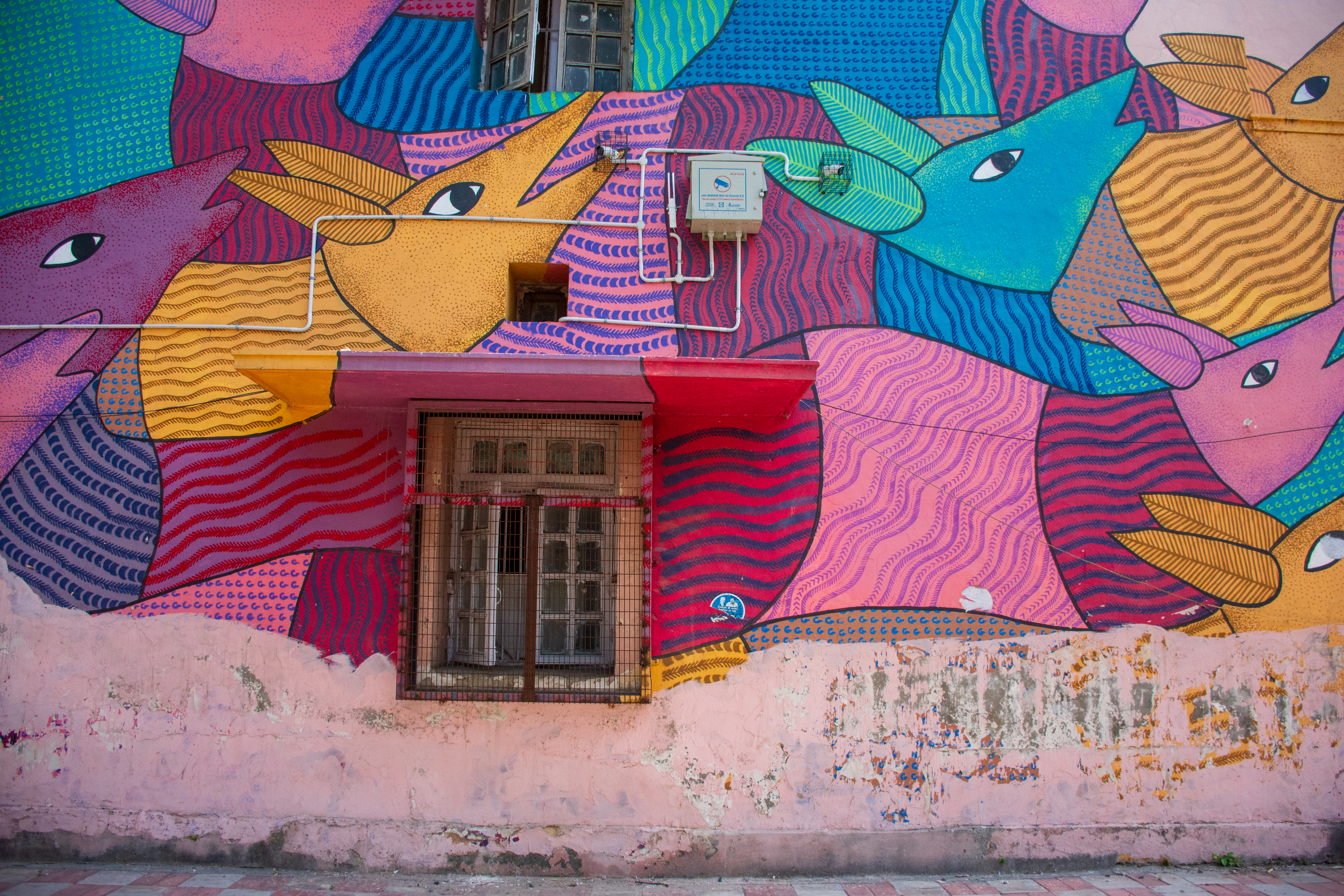
Dilliwale (2019) Bhajju Shyam

Lodhi Art District is India’s first open-air public art district, located in Lodhi Colony, New Delhi. It features large-scale murals and street art created by artists from India and around the world. Developed as part of an initiative by the St+art India Foundation.

== History and Development ==
The Lodhi Art District was conceptualized and brought to life between 2015 and 2016. The project aimed to revitalize the walls of Lodhi Colony's residential and administrative buildings, which are owned by the Central Public Works Department (CPWD).

The project was made possible through partnerships with governmental bodies, embassies, and corporate sponsors.
