= List of eponymous roads in Delhi =

This is a list of roads in Delhi, India named after people, organized by district.

== Central Delhi ==
Road	Named after	Notes
Aurangzeb Road	Emperor Aurangzeb	Aurangzeb road, after the 6th Mughal Emperor. Officially called Dr.A.P.J Abdul Kalam Rd 11th President of India
Ajmal Khan Road	Mohammad Ajmal Khan	Founder of Jamia Millia Islamia.
Amrita Shergil Marg	Amrita Sher-Gil	Hungarian-Indian painter. Formerly called Ratendone Road. The road runs alongside Lodi Garden, which was previously called Lady Willingdon Park. Ratendone Road was named after her son, Viscount Ratendone.
Baba Kharak Singh Marg	Baba Kharak Singh	Indian independence activist. Formerly called Irwin Road, after British viceroy Lord Irwin.
Bahadur Shah Zafar Marg	Bahadur Shah Zafar	Last Mughal emperor.
Balwant Rai Mehta Lane	Balwantrai Mehta	2nd Chief Minister of Gujarat. Formerly called Curzon Lane, after the British Viceroy who oversaw the partition of Bengal, George Curzon.
Dr Bishambar Das Marg	Bishambar Das	Das was a Punjab-born doctor who popularized homoeopathy in India. Formerly called Allenby Road, after British field marshal Edmund Allenby.
Jawahar Lal Nehru Marg	Jawaharlal Nehru	1st Prime Minister of India. Formerly called Circular Road.
Kasturba Gandhi Marg	Kasturba Gandhi	Wife of Mahatma Gandhi. Formerly called Curzon Road, after George Curzon.
Shrimant Madhavrao Scindia Marg	Madhavrao Scindia	Union minister. Formerly called Canning Road, after British Governor-General Charles Canning.
Maulana Azad Road	Abul Kalam Azad	1st Minister of Education. Formerly called King Edward Road.
Rafi Marg	Rafi Ahmed Kidwai	1st Minister for Communications. Formerly called Old Mill Road, after a flour mill in the area.
Rajaji Marg	C. Rajagopalachari	Last Governor-General of India. Formerly called King George's Avenue, after George VI.
Rajesh Pilot Marg	Rajesh Pilot	Union minister. Formerly called South End Road
Sardar Patel Marg	Vallabhbhai Patel	1st Deputy Prime Minister of India. Originally named Kitchener Road, after British Field Marshal Herbert Kitchener.
Subramania Bharti Marg	Subramania Bharati	20th century Tamil poet. Formerly called Cornwallis Road after the British governor general Edward Cornwallis.
Thyagaraja Marg	Tyagaraja	18th century Carnatic music composer. Formerly called Clive Road, after first British administrator of Bengal Robert Clive.
Tilak Marg	Bal Gangadhar Tilak	Indian nationalist. Formerly called Hardinge Road, after British viceroy Charles Hardinge.
Tolstoy Marg	Leo Tolstoy	Russian writer. Formerly called Keeling Road, after chief engineer of Delhi, Hugh Keeling.
Vivekanand Marg	Swami Vivekananda	Formerly called Minto Road, after British Governor-General 1st Earl of Minto and his grandson Governor-General 4th Earl of Minto.

== East Delhi ==
Road	Named after	Notes
Haneef Uddin Marg	Haneef Uddin	Indian Army Captain who died while serving with the 11th battalion of Rajputana Rifles in the Kargil War.
Maharaja Agrasen Road	Agrasen	Legendary Maharaja of Agroha.

== New Delhi ==
Road	Named after	Notes
Akbar Road	Akbar	3rd Mughal emperor.
Alexander M. Kadakin Marg	Alexander Kadakin	Russian Ambassador to India.
André Malraux Marg	André Malraux	French novelist and French Minister of Cultural Affairs.
Aruna Asaf Ali Marg	Aruna Asaf Ali	First Mayor of Delhi.
Bhai Vir Singh Marg	Vir Singh	Punjabi writer.
Chelmsford Road	Lord Chelmsford	Viceroy (1916–21).
Connaught Lane	Duke of Connaught	
Copernicus Marg	Nicolaus Copernicus	Renaissance polymath from Poland. Formerly called Lytton Road, after British Viceroy Robert Bulwer-Lytton. The road was renamed at the request of Natwar Singh, who served as India's Ambassador to Poland in the 1970s.
Dalhousie Road	Lord Dalhousie	Dalhousie Road(colloquially) after Governor-General Lord Dalhousie.Officially Dara Shikoh Road named after Eldest son of Mughal emperor Shah Jahan.
Gamal Abdel Nasser Marg	Gamal Abdel Nasser	2nd President of Egypt.
Hailey Road	Malcolm Hailey	British peer and administrator in British India.
Connaught Circus	Duke of Connaught	Connaught Circus, after the Duke of Connaught.
Jai Singh Marg	Jai Singh I	Senior most general and a high-ranking mansabdar at the imperial court of Mughal Empire
Justice S.B. Road	S. B. Sinha	Supreme Court Justice.
Justice Sunanda Bhandare Marg	Sunanda Bhandare	Delhi High Court Justice.
Kamraj Road	K. Kamaraj	3rd Chief Minister of Madras State. Formerly called Dupleix Road, after Governor General of French India Joseph François Dupleix.
Kwame Nkrumah Marg	Kwame Nkrumah	1st Prime Minister and President of Ghana.
Lodi Road	Lodi dynasty	Last dynasty of the Delhi Sultanate.
Maharshi Raman Marg	Ramana Maharshi	Indian sage.
Archbishop Makarios Marg	Makarios III	Archbishop and 1st President of Cyprus.
Mansingh Road	Man Singh I	One of the Navaratnas, of the royal court of Akbar.
Mohammad Ali Jauhar Marg	Mohammad Ali Jauhar	One of the founders and presidents of the All-India Muslim League.
Mother Teresa Crescent	Mother Teresa	Formerly called Willingdon Crescent.
Motilal Nehru Marg	Motilal Nehru	Formerly called York Road, after George VI who was made the Duke of York in 1920.
Mustafa Kemal Ataturk Marg	Mustafa Kemal Atatürk	Founder of the Republic of Turkey.
Najaf Khan Road	Najaf Khan	Builder of Najafgarh and commander of the Mughal armies during 1772-82.
Nelson Mandela Road	Nelson Mandela	1st President of South Africa.
Prithviraj Road	Prithviraj Chauhan	King from the Chahamana (Chauhan) dynasty.
Connaught Place	Duke of Connaught	Connaught Place(Colloquially), after the Duke of Connaught. Officially Rajiv Chowk named after 6th Prime Minister of India.
Rao Tula Ram Marg	Rao Tula Ram	Leader in the rebellion of 1857.
Safdarjung Road	Safdar Jang	Nawab of Awadh
Shahjahan Road	Shah Jahan	5th Mughal emperor
Tughlaq Road	Tughlaq Dynasty	Dynasty that ruled the Delhi Sultanate from 1320 to 1413.
Rajmata Vijayaraje Scindia Marg	Vijaya Raje Scindia	Rajmata of Gwalior State
Dr Zakir Hussain Marg	Zakir Husain	3rd President of India.

== North Delhi ==
Road	Named after	Notes
Sham Nath Marg	Sham Nath	Deputy Minister for Railways in the 1960s. Formerly called Alipur Road.
Rani Jhansi Road	Lakshmibai	Rani of Jhansi. Formerly called Mutiny Memorial Road (often abbreviated to MM Road)

== Old Delhi ==
Road	Named after	Notes
Ansari Road	Mukhtar Ahmed Ansari	Indian political leader. Formerly called Darya Ganj Road.
Netaji Subhash Marg	Subhas Chandra Bose	Indian nationalist. Formerly called Elgin Road, after British viceroy.
Swami Shradhanand Marg	Swami Shraddhanand	Social reformer. Formerly called Garstin Bastion Road.(Widely known as GB Road)

== South Delhi ==
Road	Named after	Notes
Benito Juarez Marg	Benito Juarez	26th President of Mexico.
Sri Aurobindo Marg	Sri Aurobindo	Indian philosopher and nationalist.
Josip Broz Tito Marg	Josip Broz Tito	Yugoslav communist leader.

== South West Delhi ==
Road	Named after	Notes
Khan Abdul Ghaffar Khan Marg	Abdul Ghaffar Khan	Pashtun independence activist.

== Roads formerly named after people ==
The following roads were once named after people, but have since been renamed after something else.

Road	Named after	Current Name	Notes
Albuquerque Road	Afonso de Albuquerque	Tees January Marg	Portuguese governor of Goa in the 16th century. Renamed Tees January Marg, after the date on which Mahatma Gandhi was assassinated on the premises of a bungalow located on the road.
Baird Road	David Baird	Bangla Sahib Marg	British general. Renamed Bangla Sahib Marg, after a nearby gurdwara.
Havelock Road	Henry Havelock	Kali Bari Marg	British general who recaptured Kanpur during the 1857 rebellion. Renamed Kali Bari Marg, after a Kali Temple built in the 1930s.
Reading Road	Lord Reading	Mandir Marg	British Viceroy. Renamed Mandir Marg, after the Laxmi Narayan Temple.
Roberts Road	Robert Tor Russell	Teen Murti Marg	Chief Architect to the Public Works Department who designed Connaught Place. Renamed Teen Murti Marg after Teen Murti Bhavan.
