= 10, Janpath =

Government residence in New Delhi

General information
- Location: Janpath, New Delhi, India
- Coordinates: 28.608926987866653°N 77.2189498691643°E
- Current tenants: Sonia Gandhi (since 1989); Rahul Gandhi (since 2023)

10, Janpath is a public-owned house on Janpath, New Delhi. It served as the residence of Lal Bahadur Shastri during his prime ministership until his death. Currently, it serves as the residence of Sonia Gandhi, who has lived there since 1989, and her son Rahul Gandhi, who lived at 12, Tughlak Lane until April 2023.

== History ==
Post India's independence, the house was the residence of India's second prime minister, Lal Bahadur Shastri (1964–1966) who succeeded Jawaharlal Nehru in the 1960s. Upon Shastri's death on 11 January 1966 at Tashkent, his body lay in state over here. Presently, a biographical museum, Lal Bahadur Shastri Memorial is situated at 1, Motilal Nehru Place, adjacent to the complex.

During the 1975 emergency, the residence was office of the Indian Youth Congress, while Ambika Soni presided. The office shut down due to severe loss of Indian National Congress in the 1977 Indian general election. Between 1977 and 1989, the Press Council of India held its office in this structure.

Third prime minister Indira Gandhi lived at 1, Safdarjung Road and 12, Willingdon Crescent when she was out of power. When Rajiv Gandhi assumed the Prime Minister's Office, he lived at 7, Race Course Road as long as he was the Prime Minister. Until then 10, Janpath was allotted to a Member of Parliament Kamla Kant Tiwari, who was MP from Buxar Lok Sabha constituency. Rajiv Gandhi was allotted 10, Janpath after he lost the 1989 elections. After his assassination in 1991, his widow Sonia Gandhi occupied 10, Janpath. She later served as the president of Indian National Congress and the Leader of the Opposition in Lok Sabha. In February 2024, Gandhi opted out of the 2024 Indian general election, citing health and age-related issues. It was reported by India Today that she opted to take the Rajya Sabha seat in order to retain the residency of 10, Janpath.

Since April 2023, the house also remains the residence of Sonia's son Rahul Gandhi, who is the current Leader of the Opposition in Lok Sabha and former President of Indian National Congress.

== Residence ==
10, Janpath is spread over 15,181 square meters in Delhi. Having 8 rooms — 5 bedrooms, 1 hall, 1 large dining room and 1 study room — it is categorized as Type-8 Bungalow. It also has a separate meeting hall, servant quarter and a large garden with two graves.

== Neighborhood ==
The national headquarters of Indian National Congress (INC) is right behind it on 24, Akbar Road.

== See also ==
- 7, Race Course Road
- Janpath
- Tughlaq Road
- Akbar Road
- Dr APJ Abdul Kalam Road
