= 7, Race Course Road =

Official Residence of the Prime Minister of India

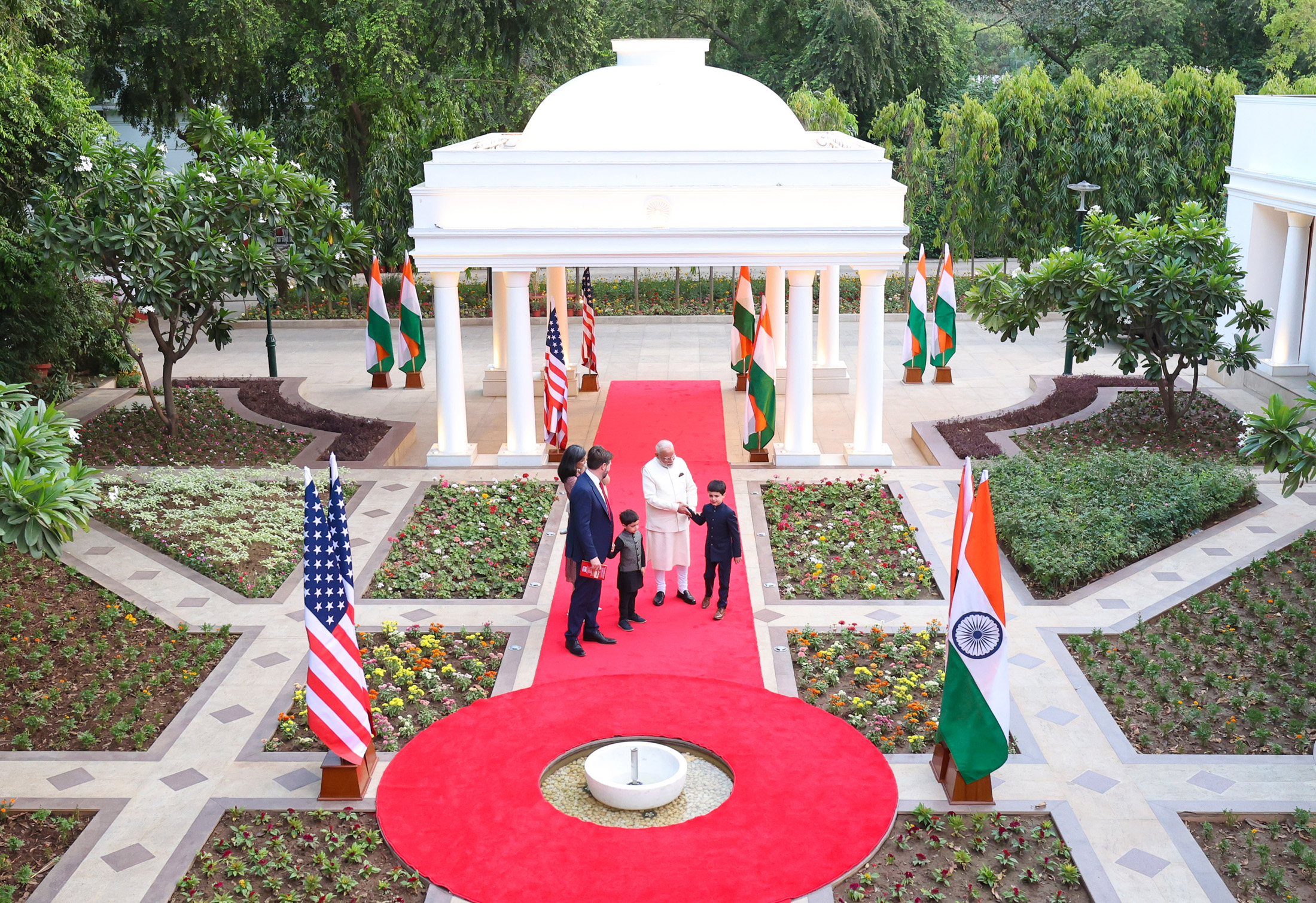
- Narendra Modi welcomes JD Vance, 50th Vice President of the United States, and his family, to 7, Race Course Road (2025)

- Location within Delhi

General information
- Location: New Delhi, India
- Coordinates: 28°36′N 77°12′E
- Current tenants: Narendra Modi (Prime Minister of India)
- Construction started: 1980

Technical details
- Size: 4.9 ha (12 acres)

7, Race Course Road, officially named 7, Lok Kalyan Marg, is the official residence and principal workplace of the Prime Minister of India. Situated on Race Course Road, New Delhi, the official name of the Prime Minister's residence complex is Panchvati. It is spread over 4.9 hectares (12 acres) of land, comprising five bungalows in Lutyens' Delhi, built in the 1980s, which are the Prime Minister's office, residency zone and security establishment, including one occupied by Special Protection Group (SPG) and another being a guest house. However, even though there are 5 bungalows, they are officially called 7, Lok Kalyan Marg. It does not house the Prime Minister's Office but has a conference room for informal meetings.

The entire Race Course Road is closed to the public. Rajiv Gandhi was the first Prime Minister to reside at 7, Race Course Road in 1984. It does not house the Prime Minister's Office (PMO), which is located in the Seva Teerth of the Seva Teerth Complex, on Raisina Hill nearby Rashtrapati Bhavan in New Delhi, where the Cabinet Secretariat and National Security Council Secretariat functions. The nearest metro station is Lok Kalyan Marg metro station. When a new Prime Minister is nominated, their original house is given a security detail and the new office holder is then advised to move in the 7, Race Course Road at the earliest possible date.

== History ==
Earlier, the Prime Ministers of India lived in their own house or house allotted to them through Parliament, allotment by virtue of being an MP. Jawaharlal Nehru took up residence in Teen Murti Bhavan, which used to be the residence of the Commander-in-Chief of the British Indian Army in British India; it was formerly called the Flagstaff House. After Nehru's death in 1964, the building was converted to the Nehru Memorial Museum and Library in 1984.

The next Prime Minister of India Lal Bahadur Shastri chose 10 Janpath as his official residence, where he stayed 1964–1966. It was later allotted to the Congress (I) party, though a part of it became biographical museum, Lal Bhadur Shastri Memorial and Museum at 1, Motilal Nehru Place (formerly 10, Janpath), adjacent to the complex. The current resident of 10, Janpath is Former INC President, Sonia Gandhi.

After the assassination of Indira Gandhi at her 1, Safdarjung Road residence garden while going towards neighbouring 1, Akbar Road office for an interview on 31 October 1984, it was converted into the Indira Gandhi Memorial and Museum. Former Chief Justice of India Sudhi Ranjan Das had previously lived at this address before Indira Gandhi.

Rajiv Gandhi, her son and successor as prime minister, along with his wife Sonia Gandhi and children Rahul Gandhi and Priyanka Gandhi, became the first occupant of 7, Race Course Road, in 1984.

When V. P. Singh became the Prime Minister, the Ministry of Urban Affairs designated 7, Race Course Road premises occupied by Rajiv Gandhi as the permanent residence and office of the Prime Minister of India to ensure that all successive prime ministers were allotted the same house on assuming office. A government notification on 30 May 1990, officially designated these bungalows as the official residence of Indian Prime Minister.

In the 1990s I. K. Gujral and some of his predecessors, used 7, Race Course Road as Prime Minister's Office (PMO).

The current prime minister, Narendra Modi, chose 5, Race Course Road as his residence as the 7, Race Course Road was being refurbished at that time, after his predecessor Manmohan Singh had vacated it. The 7, Race Course Road was chosen as Modi's office.

== Name ==
7, Race Course Road was officially renamed to 7, Lok Kalyan Marg in September 2016, when the road on which it is located was also renamed.

== Construction ==
The bungalows of the 7, Race Course Road were originally designed by Robert Tor Russell, who was part of British architect Edwin Lutyens’ team, when he was designing New Delhi in the 1920s and 1930s.

== The Bungalows ==
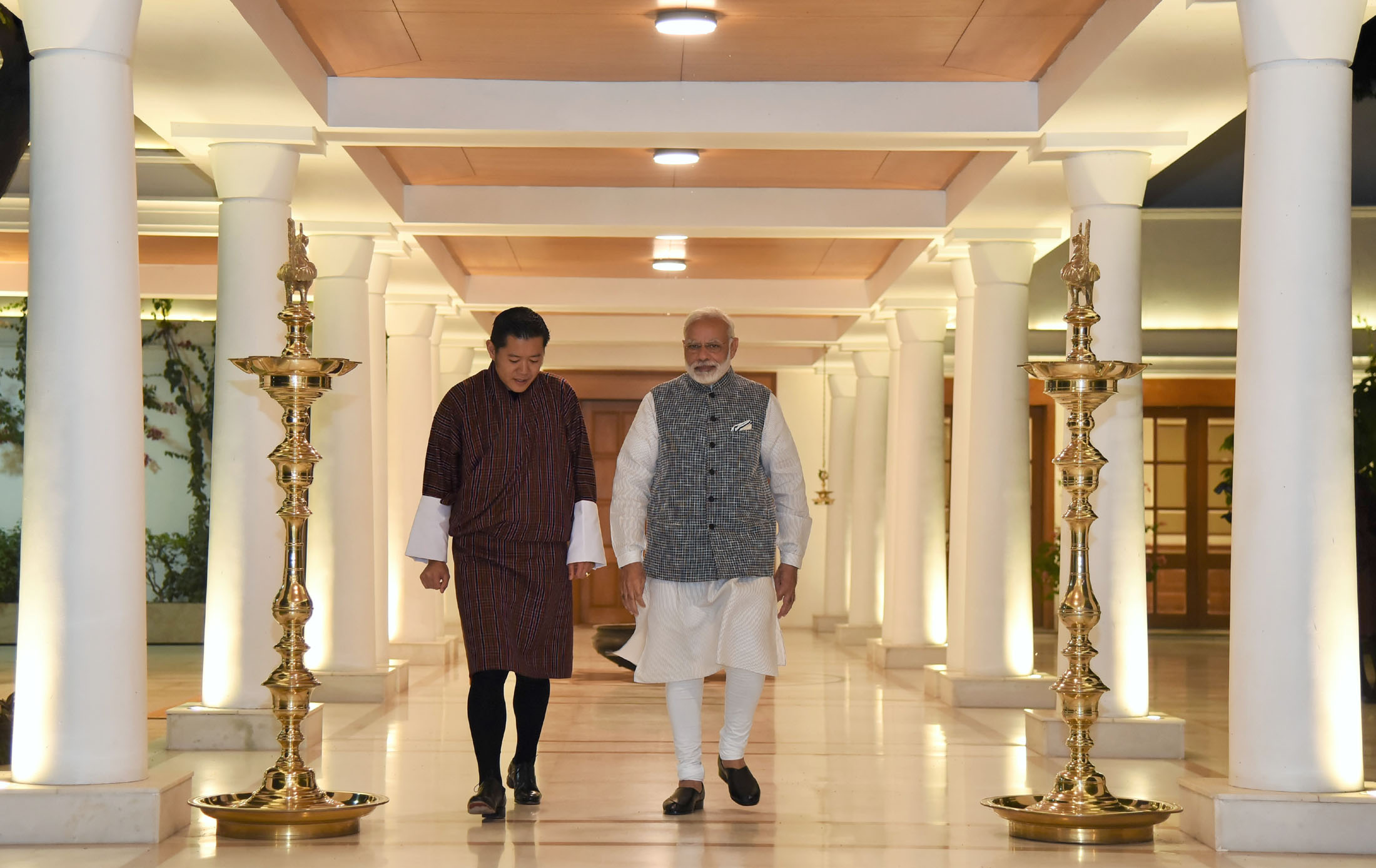
PM Narendra Modi welcomes the King of Bhutan, 2017

The 4.9-hectare (12-acre) Prime Minister's residence was built in the 1980s. It does not have his office inside the house, but has a conference room for informal meetings. The Prime Minister's residence and office and security spread across five bungalows: Bungalow 1, 3, 5, 7 and 9. This includes 5, Race Course Road, the Private Residential Zone for the Prime Minister, though he primarily operates from 7, Race Course Road.

Bungalow 1 is a helipad for the service of Prime Minister which is being used as so since September 2003. It is under the control of the Special Protection Group. The entire road with bungalows numbering 1, 3, 5, 7, 9 and 11 came under Prime Minister's residential complex.

Bungalow 3 which was earlier the residence of Dr. Manmohan Singh has now been converted into a guesthouse for Prime Minister's guests.

Bungalow 9 is occupied by the Special Protection Group (SPG) that guards the Prime Minister. A 1.5-kilometre-long (0.93 mi) tunnel connects the Indian prime minister's residence to the Safdarjung Airport, where high-importance helicopters land. Constructed beyond Kemal Atatürk Marg, Golf Course and Safdarjung Tomb and then an overground drive to surface at the helicopter hangar at the airport, work on the tunnel began in 2010 and was completed by July 2014 and Modi was the first Prime Minister to use it.

Current prime minister Narendra Modi uses 5, Race Course Road as his residence which has also been used as so by Atal Bihari Vajpayee and Rajiv Gandhi.

=== Panchvati ===
In 2001, during the tenure of Vajpayee, a state-of-the-art auditorium was constructed at the cost of ₹26.58 million (US$280,000) and was named as Panchvati, it has been named after the spot where Ram and Sita had built their hut during their exile. It is equipped for video conferencing and simultaneous translations. This can be modelled into 2–3 conference rooms and can also act as a banquet for a gathering of 200–340 people. This can be used as a cabinet meeting room and can also be arranged to form a theatre.

=== Security ===
While the Special Protection Group (SPG) is the primary agency in charge of the security, it is aided by the Central Reserve Police Force (CRPF), Border Security Force (BSF) and the Delhi Police to provide three-rung security for the estate. There is only one entrance to 7, Race Course Road, which is guarded by the SPG. Only those visitors whose names have been given to SPG by the prime minister's personal secretaries are allowed in. The rule applies to everybody, including the national security adviser, top bureaucrats, relatives and guests (barring close family) and visitors are expected to carry an identity card. No outside vehicle is allowed to go beyond the checkpoint and even high-profile visitors including cabinet ministers are required to park their official vehicles by the checkpoint. Special SPG vehicles are used to carry the guests from the checkpoint to the residential office of the Prime Minister. The only exception to this rule is for the SPG protectors themselves who are allowed to take the vehicle carrying them into the complex.

The whole area is a no-fly zone and airspace usage around the area is highly restricted and monitored. Over the years, its security has gradually been increased. A bulletproof glass-tube passage was built in 2003, connecting Bungalow 3, at the Prime Minister's residence, to Panchvati or 7 Race Course Road, where the Prime Minister meets people and delegations and holds official meetings. A concrete wall was added on the periphery, separating the house from the main road, to render any truck bomb or a car bomb attack ineffective. However, the residence is surrounded by various high rise building and public structures, including Samrat Hotel, Ashoka Hotel, and state guesthouses on one side, to the Delhi Gymkhana Club (DCG) and Delhi Race Course which lies on the other. Accordingly, plans for a helipad within the complex were mooted for several years. By 2004, the Intelligence Bureau (IB) took over most of the rooms of Samrat Hotel overlooking the residence and watchtowers were erected inside Delhi Gymkhana. The Delhi Gymkhana can be accessed only via Safdarjung Road. The residence has a power substation, and doctors and nurses from the All India Institute of Medical Sciences are on duty round the clock. There are several ambulances on standby, one of which always accompanies the prime minister's motorcade. The civic officials ensure that there are no traffic bottlenecks on Kemal Atatürk Marg that runs outside the bungalows.

In 2004, the road was refurbished at a cost of ₹70 million (US$750,000) to make it the permanent residence of the Indian Prime Minister.

7 LKM also has massive, manicured lawns and has abundant gulmohar, semal and arjuna trees which homes several birds, including peacocks.

=== Staff ===
Besides the secretarial staff, it has a support staff of about 200 gardeners, servants, and electricians. They are employed after a background check.

== Workplace ==
The workplace at 7 LKM has two small rooms on either side from the entrance for each of the two personal secretaries. Then there is a small corridor with a visitor's room to the right. Further ahead is a chamber to meet guests. Adjacent to that is the living space for larger meetings, behind which is the dining room where breakfast and lunch meetings are hosted. A corridor from 7 LKM leads to Panchvati which can be segmented into two or three conference rooms or a large banquet hall.

On the walls are artworks loaned by the National Gallery of Modern Art (NGMA) which are often changed in consultation with the prime minister's office. The gifts received by the Prime Minister are either displayed at 7 LKM or are sent to the toshakhana (treasure house).

== New Residential Complex ==
A new Prime Minister's residence is coming up under the new central vista redevelopment project adjacent to the South Block on the Dara Shikoh road in New Delhi with a better space and amenities. It is constructed adjacent to the upcoming Executive Enclave which will officially house the new Prime Minister's Office, shifting it from the current location in the South Block on Raisina Hill.

== See also ==
- List of official residences of India
- Rashtrapati Bhavan
- Prime Minister's Office, India
