= 12, Tughlaq Road =

- Interactive map of the 12, Tughlaq Road area
- Former names: 12, Tughlaq Lane

General information
- Type: Official residence
- Architectural style: Colonial
- Location: Tughlaq Road, Lutyens' Delhi, New Delhi, India
- Coordinates: 28.5936°N 77.2129°E
- Construction started: circa 1920s
- Owner: Government of India

12, Tughlaq Road (also known as 12, Tughlaq Lane) is a Type VII government bungalow on Tughlaq Road in Lutyens' Delhi, New Delhi, India. It forms part of the cluster of stately bungalows allotted by the Directorate of Estates to Members of Parliament and senior office-holders of the Union government.

The bungalow was constructed in the 1920s as part of the British-era civic scheme designed by Sir Edwin Lutyens and Sir Herbert Baker, featuring high ceilings, colonnaded verandahs and deep eaves, set within a landscaped compound of mature jamun and shamiana trees.

In 1977, former Prime Minister Charan Singh was allotted the residence upon joining the Morarji Desai ministry. His son, RLD leader Ajit Singh, occupied it until 2014, when the Directorate served an eviction notice and later imposed a penalty of ₹ 5,77,500 for overstaying beyond his allotment.

In 2004, then-Member of Parliament Rahul Gandhi was allotted 12, Tughlaq Road, and he remained in residence for nearly two decades. Following his disqualification as an MP in April 2023, Gandhi vacated the bungalow on 22 April 2023 and temporarily moved to his mother's official residence at 10, Janpath. Upon restoration of his Lok Sabha membership on 4 August 2023, he was re-allotted the same bungalow but chose not to return, later shifting instead to 5, Sunehri Bagh Road.

The neighbouring Tughlaq Road police station holds its own place in modern Indian history, having registered FIRs in the aftermath of the assassinations of Mahatma Gandhi in 1948 and Indira Gandhi in 1984.

== See also ==
- 10, Janpath
- List of official residences of India
