= Temple 360 =

Indian web portal

- Available in: English and Hindi
- Founded: March 2022
- Country of origin: India
- Area served: India
- Owner: Ministry of Culture, India
- Key people: Meenakshi Lekhi, Minister
- Services: Online Darshan of 12 Jyotirlinga and 4 Dham
- Website: temple360.in

Temple 360 is a web portal which was launched by Meenakshi Lekhi, Minister of Culture, Government of India to do online darshan of Pilgrim Sites in Hinduism. It was launched on the Occasion of Azadi Ka Amrit Mahotsav.

== Function ==
It allows anyone to visit or do online darshan of 12 Jyotirlinga and 4 Dham anytime from anywhere from India by which the Devotee can perform e-aarti.
