= Pran Nath Lekhi =

Indian lawyer

Former President, Delhi High Court Bar Association

Personal details
- Born: 1924/1925
- Died: 28 February 2010 New Delhi
- Spouse: Kamla
- Children: Somyata Bansal, Vandana Lekhi, Aman Lekhi
- Profession: Barrister

Pran Nath Lekhi (प्राण नाथ लेखी; 1924/25 – 28 February 2010) was an Indian Lawyer. He was one of India's leading lawyers, who primarily practiced at the Supreme Court of India and the High Court of Delhi. Lekhi was a well-known practitioner of constitutional laws and is famous for various Public Interest Litigations.

== Early life ==
Pran Nath Lekhi was a topper in the Civil Service Examination, but fed up with the malfunctioning of the system he quit the civil servant's job and took up the study of law. Here too, he emerged as a winner and was a gold medallist.

Lekhi participated in the Quit India Movement and was imprisoned many times. As Secretary of the Students Congress and organiser of 'Free INA Prisoners' movement, he was arrested and imprisoned in 1945 and 1946. During the Emergency, he was detained under MISA and spent more than half of the imprisonment in solitary confinement.

== Major cases and clients ==
Though his preferred field was criminal law, he handled almost all branches of law with equal ease and dexterity. Lekhi had a special charm for fighting the establishment, and was a well-known practitioner of constitutional laws and was famous for various Public Interest Litigation.

The senior advocate is remembered for his appearance before the Shah Commission after the Emergency wherein he was appointed as government pleader, prosecuting the Nagarwala Case, defending Satwant Singh in the Indira Gandhi murder case, and as the lawyer for Zaheera Sheikh in the Best Bakery case etc.

He also represented MPs in the bribery case leading to the Supreme Court defining privileges of Parliament and State Legislature.

Lekhi was also the advocate for Rashtriya Mukti Morcha (RMM), an NGO, which filed a petition in the Jharkhand Mukti Morcha bribery case. He again represented the RMM, which raised the issue of the foreign origin of Congress president Sonia Gandhi in the Delhi High Court and the Supreme Court.

One of his last appearances in the Delhi High Court was for Patriots' Forum, an NGO, which challenged the findings of the Justice Rajinder Sachar Committee, meant to look into the social, economic and educational status of Muslims. He argued that promotion of Muslims as a religious community would result in "destruction" of the secular polity promised by the Indian Constitution.

He conducted the cross examination of the Assassination of Indira Gandhi as the defense counsel, the cross examination of Dr T D Dogra, the sole medical witness, to challenge the veracity of Post-mortem examination is an example of his skills in defense.

== Legal Acumen ==
He was popular because of his qualities and the fraternity had in him. He was President of the Delhi High Court Bar Association for five times, twice in consecutive succession. Once he contested the election while he was detained in prison in 1976 and emerged victorious.

He was designated as a Senior Advocate by the Delhi High Court on 27 April 1977.

Pran Nath Lekhi was regarded by many to be Ram Jethmalani's candidate to be the Attorney General but the slot that was ultimately filled by Soli Sorabjee, a legal luminary from the liberal school.

== Controversies ==
=== Contempt of Court ===
On 23 January 1986 The Hindustan Times reported the statement of Lekhi under two captions: (1) 'Lekhi calls verdict a farce', and (2) 'High tension at Tihar'. Thereafter, a petition under the Contempt of Courts Act was filed by one S.P. Mahna. The statements were an echo of the judgment dated 22 January 1986 delivered by Shri Mahesh Chdra, Additional Sessions Judge, in the "Indira Gandhi murder case" in which Satwant Singh, Balbir Singh and Kehar Singh were held guilty of the offences of conspiracy and murder and were sentenced to death.

However, the Delhi High Court bench consisting of Justice R Aggarwal and Justice M Sharief-Ud-Din on a careful consideration to all the aspects of the case, came to the conclusion that the petition should not be proceeded with.

One of the considerations that weighed with the Court in its view was that Satwant Singh, Kehar Singh and Balbir Singh had filed appeals against their convictions and sentences and they were pending in the High Court. The reference for confirmation of death sentence was also pending and both the reference and the appeals were likely to be heard in the near future. The appeal by Satwant Singh had been filed through Shri P. N. Lekhi and in all probability he would be arguing the appeal for Satwant Singh. The appeal by Kehar Singh and Balbir Singh has been filed by Shri P. P. Grover, advocate. Further Shri Lekhi in his reply had raised certain contentions which were also likely to have been raised in the appeals. Thus the Hon'ble Court was of the view that if contempt petition was proceeded with, then any decision could prejudice the accused or the prosecution at the hearing of the appeals. At this juncture, Shri Salman Khurshid, advocate for the petitioner, realizing the force of the above view contended that the matter may be postponed sine die and taken up after the appeals are finally decided, however the same was rejected.

However, the Delhi High Court bench composed of Justice R Aggarwal and Justice M Sharief-Ud-Din while stating that "the expressions and the language, used in the offending passages are very strong and in our view should have been avoided by Shri Lekhi" on a careful consideration to all the aspects of the case, came to the conclusion that the petition should not be proceeded with.

The Delhi High Court disposed of the petition with the following observations and dropped the proceedings – "the expressions and the language, used in the offending passages are very strong and in our view should have been avoided by Shri Lekhi".

== Family ==
When Pran Nath Lekhi died on 28 February 2010, he was survived by his wife Kamla and three children. His son, Aman Lekhi was also designated as Senior Advocate in 2005. He has handled variety of matters in the Supreme Court, most popular among them are Constitutional validity of ban on lotteries, Lajpat Nagar bomb blast, Redfort shootout, Vasantkunj multiple murder case etc. He has also argued in the matters such as 2G Spectrum, Right to information, CWG, Medical negligence etc. He dealt with probate of will of Rajmata Vijaya Raje Scindia. Aman Lekhi, a successful celebrity Advocate like his father but always far from any media glare.

His daughter-in-law, Meenakshi Lekhi, is a member of the Indian parliament, lawyer of the Supreme Court and a socio-political activist. She is the Vice President of the BJP Mahila Morcha and the National Spokesperson of the BJP Media Cell. In the 2014 Indian parliamentary elections, Meenakshi Lekhi won from the New Delhi parliament seat on a BJP ticket.
