= Delhi Gymkhana =

Club in New Delhi, India

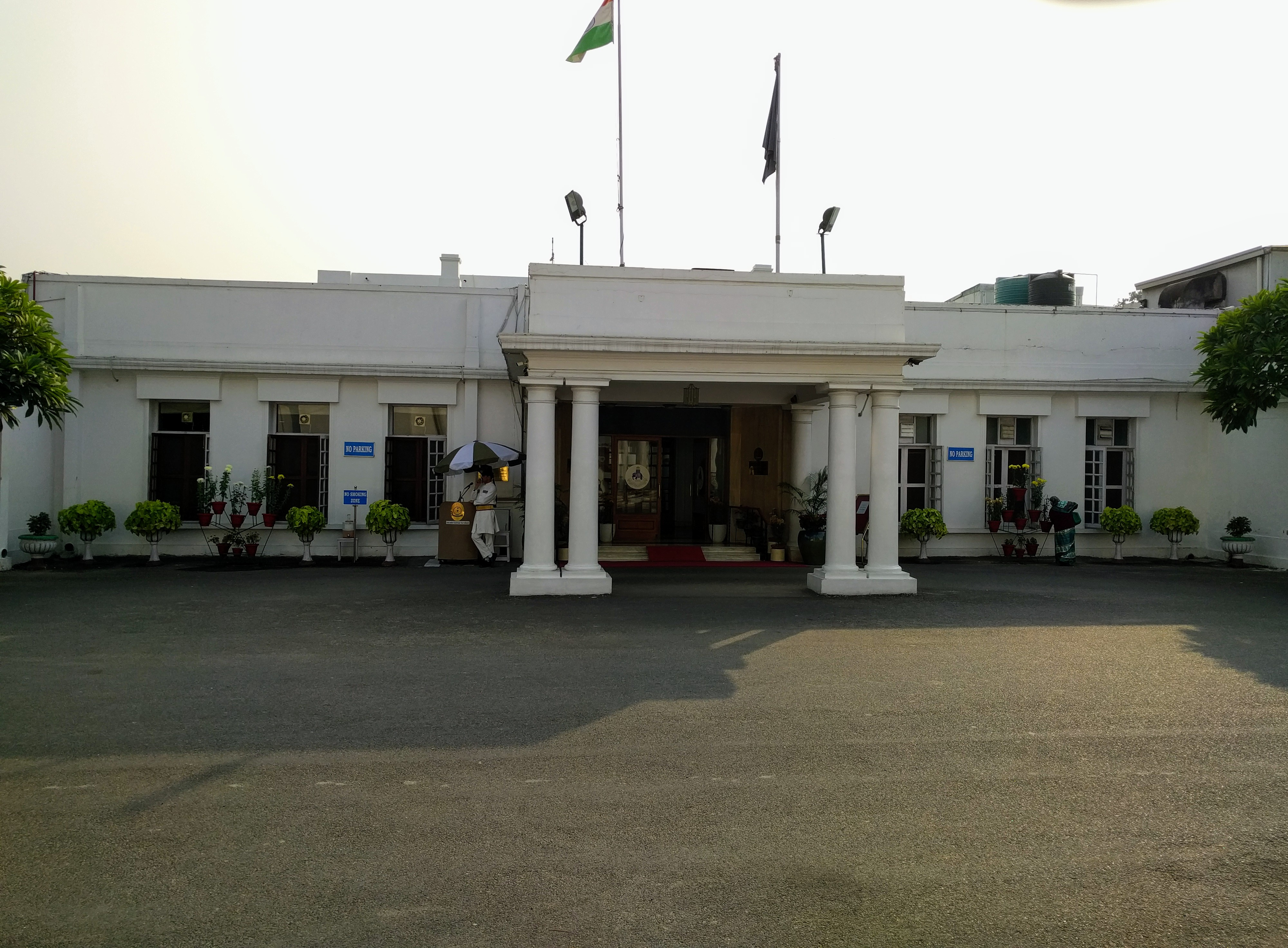
- Picture of the Delhi Gymkhana
- Interactive map of Delhi Gymkhana
- Address: India
- Location: New Delhi, Delhi, India
- Operator: Delhi Gymkhana

Construction
- Built: 1913

The Delhi Gymkhana Club (DGC) or Delhi Gymkhana is a club in New Delhi at 2, Safdarjung Road. Established in 1913, the club is spread over 27.3 acre in Lutyens' Delhi. It has approximately 14000 members, with 5,000 permanent members from senior Civil Services Officers including IAS, IPS and the Armed forces, besides members from legal, diplomatic and corporate fields.

== History ==
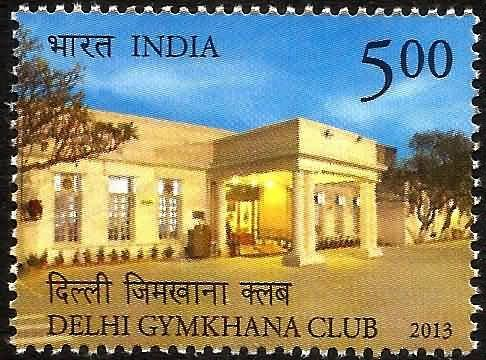
Commemorative stamp for Delhi Gymkhana Club Centenary, released by Government of India in 2013

Originally the Imperial Delhi Gymkhana Club, it was founded on 3 July 1913 after the British shifted India's capital from Kolkata (formerly Calcutta) to newly form New Delhi. Initially it was located at Coronation Grounds near Civil Lines, Delhi. Its first president was Spencer Harcourt Butler, first governor of the then United Provinces of Agra and Oudh. In 1928, the club was allotted 27.3 acres (110,000 m^{2}) of land in the new imperial capital of India, New Delhi, on a perpetual lease with a token rent.

The present building of club was designed by British architect Robert Tor Russell in the 1930s, who had previously designed the Connaught Place and Teen Murti House. In early 1930s, the wife of the Viceroy of India, donated ₹21,000 to fast-track construction of a swimming pool, a marble plaque still commemorates: "Lady Willingdon Swimming Bath."

The word imperial was dropped when India gained independence in 1947.

The club is located in the heart of Lutyens' Delhi on Safdarjung Road, per the site plan drawn up by Sir Edwin Lutyens as part of his grand design for Imperial Celebrations. Lutyens Delhi - the eighth in line - was built in an area littered with stones, tombs, domes, ruined walls and gardens of imperial former capitals - the historic crossroads and battlegrounds of India. Over the years the complex developed to house 26 grass tennis courts, 7 clay courts, 3 squash courts, badminton courts, a billiards room and a covered swimming pool. It also has three lounge bars and 43 resident cottages.

== Controversies ==
The club has long faced allegations of elitism, and restrictive membership rules, with waiting for common people stretching to 30 years. with waiting period fee of Rs 7.5 lakh, and subsequent membership fee of Rs 5 lakh for government members, Rs 22 lakh for a non-government members. In July 2014, Government of Delhi launched a crackdown on the club for its failure to pay luxury tax dues amounting to ₹2.92 crore for the past three years.

In August 2014, it was reported that the club had been using unauthorized bore wells and violating environmental rules. The Delhi Pollution Control Committee in August 2014 ordered closure of the Delhi Gymkhana Club; however, National Green Tribunal required the club to pay a penalty of ₹5 lakh fine to avoid closure.

In April 2020, a Ministry of Corporate Affairs investigations revealed several violations, mismanagements and irregularities, most importantly that the club had been using "illegal way" to induct people into permanent memberships, acting autocratically and hereditary manner, while the waiting list for the non-government category was 37 years. Thereafter the government petitioned the National Company Law Tribunal (NCLT) to a change of club management by appointing 15 government nominees as administrators in the General Committee to regularise it functioning. Subsequently, on April 2, 2022, the Tribunal allowed the Government to nominate 15 persons as Directors on the General Committee of the Club.

Although the club claims to operate as a non-for-profit entity under Section 8, it has a net worth of approx. Rs 129 crore. In 2024, its financial dealings were flagged by auditors when it showed a surplus of Rs 9.5 crore in 2023-24, a sharp jump from Rs 93 lakh in 2022-23. It had bank fixed deposits worth Rs 24 crore and mutual fund holdings with a market value of Rs 217 crore.

== Order to vacate premises ==
The Land and Development Office (L&DO), under Ministry of Housing and Urban Affairs, had previously send three formal letters over the past nine months demanding the club to pay the outstanding ground rent amount of ₹47.58 crore. After there was no response from the club, on May 22, 2026 the club was ordered by the government to vacate its premises within two weeks, citing urgent public interest requirements, including defence and security infrastructure as it situated adjacent to Prime Minister's residence The eviction notice, invokes Clause 4 of the original lease deed, which allows the government to resume possession of land required for "public purpose."

Previously, eviction notices had been served to nearby clubs in Lutyens Delhi, including Delhi Race Club (53.4 acres) and Jaipur Polo Grounds spread over 15 acre, besides three “jhuggi-jhopdi" (hutments) clusters in the area, to improve security infrastructure.

== See also ==
- Delhi Golf Club
- India International Centre
