= Aman Lekhi =

Indian supreme court advocate

Personal details
- Spouse: Meenakshi Lekhi
- Education: St Xavier's School, Delhi. First division in graduation from Hindu College First division in LLB from Campus Law Centre (Faculty of Law)
- Occupation: Lawyer
- Website: http://amanlekhiblog.com

Aman Lekhi is a senior advocate of the Supreme Court of India and is the former Additional Solicitor General of India in the Apex Court. He is named in the list of Top 100 Legal Luminaries of India by LexisNexis in May 2016.

He practices in the Supreme Court of India. He also appears regularly in various courts and Tribunals and is also actively involved in several arbitrations.

== Personal life ==
Aman Lekhi is the son of renowned Supreme Court lawyer Pran Nath Lekhi. He did his schooling from St. Xavier's School, Delhi and thereafter he graduated with distinction in Political Science (Honours) from Hindu College, University of Delhi and received a Degree in law with first division from Campus Law Centre, University of Delhi. He is married to lawyer and BJP Member of Parliament from New Delhi Constituency, Meenakshi Lekhi.

== Notable cases ==
The senior advocate's practice covers several legal disciplines. Apart from appearing in the Indian coal allocation scam case, 2G spectrum case and Commonwealth Games (CWG) scam case; he appeared for Ashis Nandy in a case that involved controversy regarding the latter’s alleged anti-Dalit remarks at the Jaipur Literature Festival, 2013. He has argued the case under Right to Information Act, 2005 against Union Public Service Commission of India with regard to Civil Services (Preliminary) Examination, 2006 subsequent to which UPSC had to change the pattern of examination itself. As a lawyer, he has argued several matters relating to telecom sector involving the Telecom Regulatory Authority of India (TRAI) wherein also, he has achieved notable success. He was the lawyer for Farida Dar "Behenji" in Lajpat Nagar Blast Case and for Nazir Ahmed Qasid and Farooq Ahmed Qasid in the case concerning the 2000 terrorist attack on Red Fort.

Aman also appears for Zee network in the cases involving Naveen Jindal.

He also appeared for Nirmaljeet Singh Narula (Nirmal Baba). He was also the lawyer in Shanti Mukund case and also the case settling the law of medical negligence dealing with the duties and ethics of medical profession.

He has also appeared in the case concerning recommendations by Justice Majithia with regard to working journalists and non-journalists newspaper and news agency employees and the challenge to Working Journalists Act of 1955. Aman Lekhi is also the lawyer for AIADMK (Amma) leader TTV Dhinakaran. He appeared for Dhinakaran in the petition for bail which was allowed by the Special Court on 29 May 2017.

He also appeared for Colonel Dinesh Pathania in Machil Encounter, known as Machil killings, which, in 2010, had triggered a cycle of violence in Kashmir. Intelligence agencies had claimed the violence was part of Pakistani covert operations. Lekhi successfully argued before the Armed Forces Tribunal for release of the army personnel on bail after they had been court-martialled in the only proceeding instituted by the army against its own personnel.

On 26 September 2017, he appeared on behalf of former Tehelka Chief Tarun Tejpal in front of the Goa Bench of the Bombay High Court. He was successful in obtaining relief for his client with the Court directing a stay on the trial.

== Additional Solicitor General of India (2018-present) ==
Aman Lekhi was appointed as an Additional Solicitor General of India in the Supreme Court in February 2018. Since his appointment, his arguments have aided the Supreme Court in clarifying the law concerning the Narcotics Drugs and Psychotropic Substances Act, 1985. The Supreme Court accepted his arguments that in determining the punishment under the legislation, the deciding factor would be the quantity and not the purity of the narcotic drug. Additionally, his arguments were also accepted by the Supreme Court to expand the scope of the Prevention of Corruption Act, 1988 for it to apply to deemed universities, which is seen as a departure from the plain meaning rule of interpreting criminal law. Lekhi also appeared for the Central Bureau of Investigation before the Supreme Court on their plea to investigate the sacrilege cases in Punjab. Lekhi represented the Central Bureau of Investigation to oppose the bail granted to Upendra Rai. He is also currently assisting the Supreme Court in a Public Interest Litigation concerning the reforms of prisons in India.

As Additional Solicitor General, Lekhi has appeared before the Armed Forces Tribunal to defend the challenge to the appointment of the Chief of Naval Staff (India), filed by Vice-Admiral Bimal Verma. The Armed Forces Tribunal dismissed the plea while agreeing that the Government of India was justified in superseding Verma. He has represented the Enforcement Directorate in the cases relating to the 2013 Indian helicopter bribery scandal, where he was successful in getting the dismissal of the anticipatory bail plea filed by Ratul Puri and the bail plea of Deepak Talwar. Lekhi was also the Senior Advocate for the Maharashtra Police in the plea challenging the arrest of the journalist - Gautam Navlakha. He has represented the Delhi Police in the case related to the assault of the Chief Secretary of Delhi and represented the Special Investigation Team in the 1984 anti-Sikh riots case. Lekhi was the counsel for the Government of Uttar Pradesh in the alleged "hate speech" case against Chief Minister Yogi Adityanath, successfully arguing for the plea challenging the order of the Allahabad High Court dismissed. He represented the administration of the Jawaharlal Nehru University when the students blocked access into the varsity's administrative building.

Lekhi represented the Lieutenant Governor of Pudducherry, Kiran Bedi in the appeal to the petition moved by a Congress MLA K Lakshminarayan challenging the communications issued by the Ministry of Home Affairs vesting powers with the Lieutenant Governor. In a major success for the Central Government, the appeal was allowed clearing the Lieutenant Governor to administer the day-to-day functioning of the Union Territory. He was engaged by the Department of Customs in the proceedings against the wife of All India Trinamool Congress Member of Parliament Abhishek Banerjee, Rujira Naroola for obstructing officers from checking her baggage at the Kolkata Airport. Lekhi successfully defended the ordinance banning the sale and import of e-cigarettes in India before the Calcutta High Court. The order was successful in ensuring that the impending entry of Juul in India was blocked.

In May 2020, Lekhi was appointed as special counsel to represent the Delhi Police in the 2020 Delhi riots case.

== Presence in media ==
He appears frequently in various national news channels including CNBC TV18. and Bloomberg. Upon invitation, Aman is a regular contributor to the Opinion section on BloombergQuint, writing on constitutional and commercial law issues.

He is invited to lecture on issues of legal and public importance whether it is the hanging of Afzal Guru or the control of Hindu temples or the question of philosophy or ideology like Mao.
