= Akbar Road =

Road in New Delhi, India

Coordinates: 28.606395°N 77.217128°E

Ik

Akbar Road is a main road in New Delhi, India. This road is named after Akbar, the third ruler of the Mughal dynasty. At the north-east end, it stretches from the India Gate roundabout. At the south-west end, it stretches up to the Teen Murti roundabout. The roundabout leads to Race Course Road, Rajaji Marg, Teen Murti Marg and Safdarjung Road. It is also the road on which India's political party, Indian National Congress, has its head office.

== Junctions ==
- A junction is formed at the roundabout connecting Mansingh Road and Maulana Azad Road.
- Another junction is formed at Motilal Nehru Place, where Motilal Nehru Road and Janpath Road intersect.
- Another junction is formed at a roundabout where Krishna Menon Road, Tughlaq Road and Tees January Marg meet.

This road, along with its adjoining roads, form the exclusive V.V.I.P zone where India's topmost powerful politicians live, which includes cabinet ministers and senior MPs. It is yards away from the Parliament and the Presidential Palace.

== Controversy ==
In 2016, General V. K. Singh demanded that the Akbar Road should be renamed as Maharana Pratap Singh Road, claiming that the Mughal emperor of Persian Chagatai Turco-Mongolic descent was an "invader". In 2018, its signage was defaced and a banner proclaiming "Maharana Pratap Singh Road" was pasted over it. An FIR was registered by the police.

== See also ==
- Akbar
- Janpath
- Tughlaq Road
- Dr APJ Abdul Kalam Road
