= Tughlaq Road =

Road in New Delhi, India

Coordinates: 28.599350°N 77.212257°E

Tughlaq Road is one of the main roads of central New Delhi. The area where the road serves has housed notable politicians over the years including Rahul Gandhi and also houses and a popular police station which registered the FIRs of the assassinations of two Gandhis.

== North end ==
The north end of this road is at the traffic circle at the junction of Krishna Menon Road, Akbar Road (east and west sides) and Tees January Marg.

== South end ==
The south end of this road is at the junction of Safdarjung Road, Prithviraj Road and Sri Aurobindo Marg, near Safdarjung's Tomb in Delhi.

== Junctions ==
This road is intersected by Dr. A.P.J.Abdul Kalaam Road and the Tughlaq Crescent near the Tugluk Road police station.

In May 2022, BJP suggested renaming many roads including Tughlaq road.

== See also ==
- Janpath
- Akbar Road
- Dr APJ Abdul Kalam Road
- 12, Tughlaq Road
