= Janpath =

Main radial road in New Delhi

Coordinates: 28.6278172°N 77.2189594°E

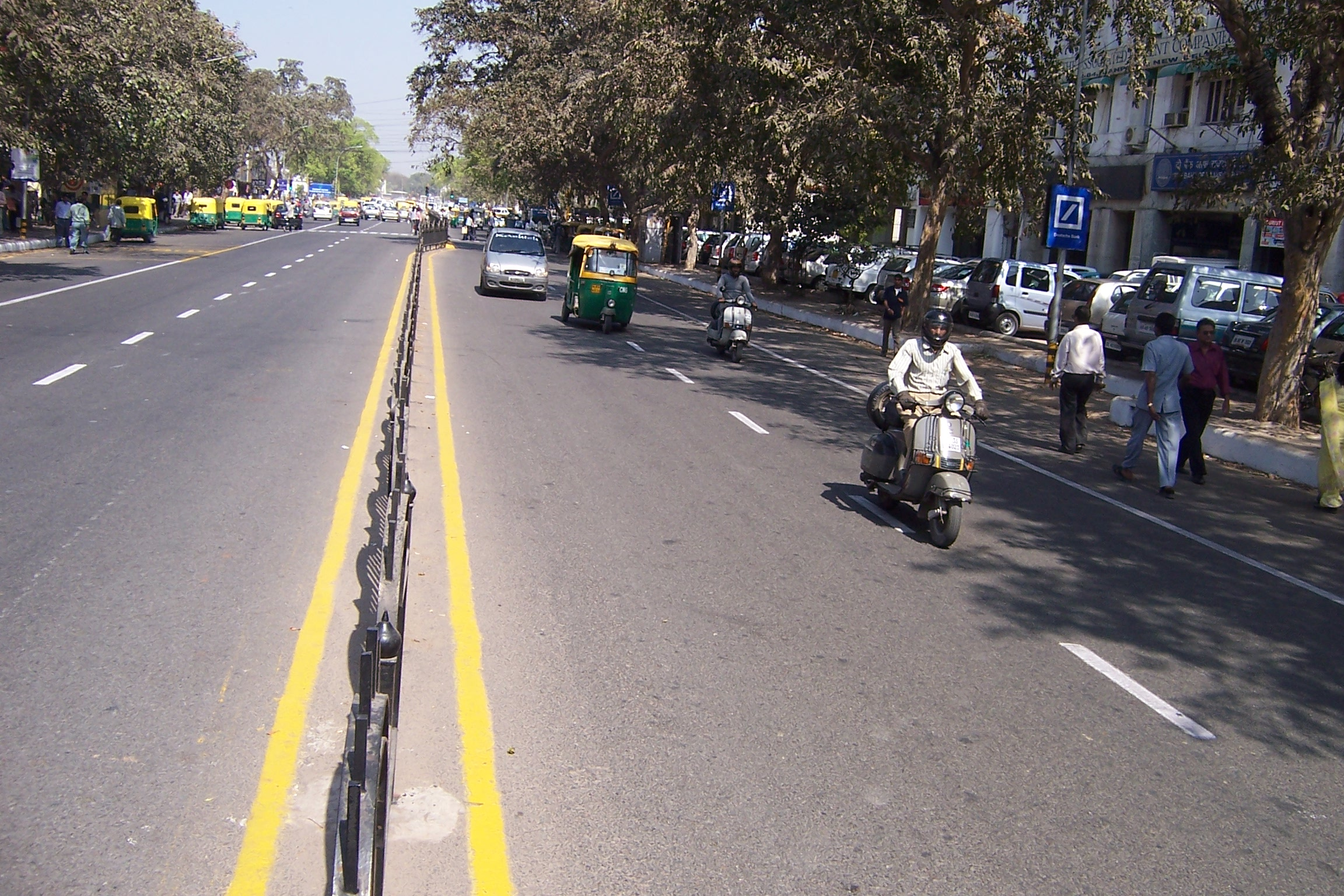
View south while crossing Janpath on foot with care, 2006.

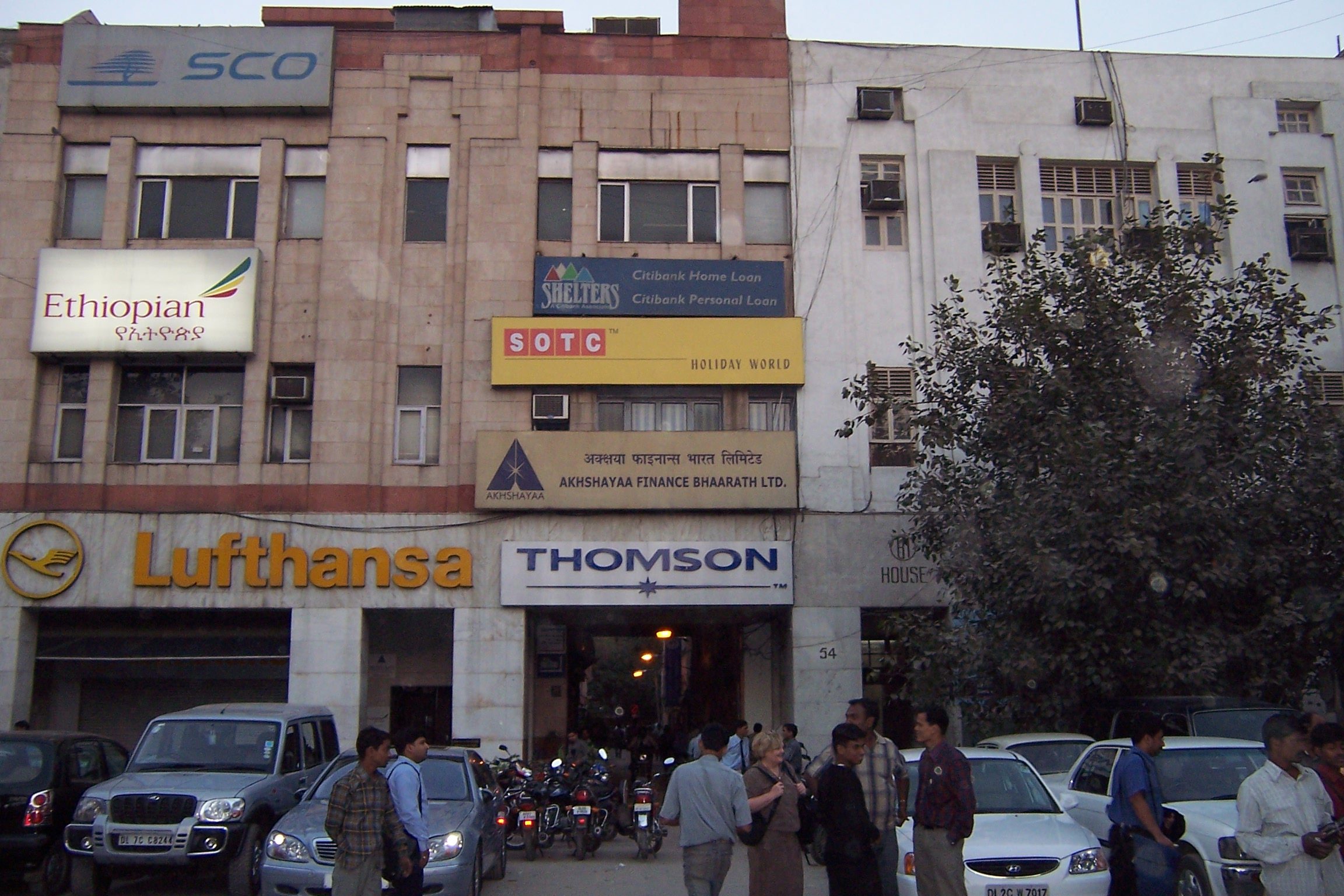
Commercial offices along Janpath, 2006.

Janpath (meaning People's Path, formerly known as Queensway) is one of the main roads in New Delhi. It starts out as Radial Road 1 in Connaught Place, adjacent to Palika Bazaar, and runs north–south perpendicular to Kartavya Path (earlier Rajpath or the "Rulers' path"). Originally called Queen's Way, it was an important part of Lutyens' design of the administrative New Delhi, upon the inauguration of new capital of India in 1931. Janpath Market is one of the most famous markets for tourists (both Indian and foreign) in New Delhi. The market essentially is a long line of boutique stores selling products which are hard to find in the malls and multi-chain stores of the city. The long line of boutiques is for budget travellers and shoppers, buyers of handicrafts and garments, curio and numerous Indian-style fast-food places. It was created during the Construction of New Delhi.

== Overview ==
In the north this road stretches from the Connaught Place. In the south it ends up at the intersection of Dr APJ Abdul Kalam Road and junction of South end road and Tees January Marg, where Hotel Claridges lies.

Commercial offices can be found along Janpath, as its central location accounts for high real estate values. Also on the stretch are the Western Court and Eastern Court buildings, the former serves as a transit hostel for members of parliament, while the latter is a post office and Mahanagar Telephone Nigam Ltd (MTNL) office. To the south of Rajpath, the road is largely residential, with the exception of the National Museum, and large Lutyen's bungalow of Ministers.

== Janpath market ==
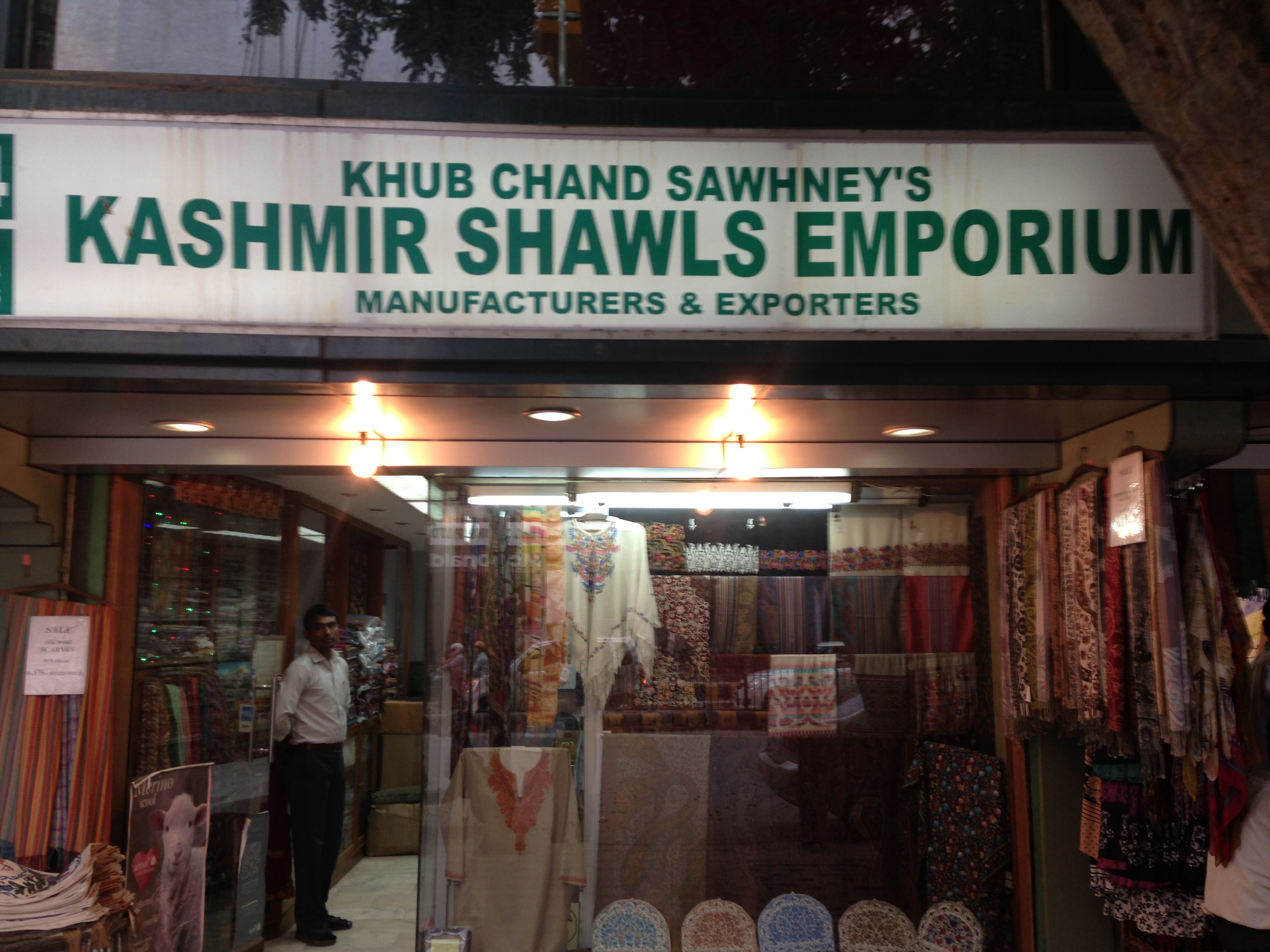
Popular Shawl boutique in Janpath.

The Janpath market stretches around 1.5 km (0.93 mi) from the Outer Circle of Connaught Place to Windsor Place. Janpath Market is one of the most famous markets for tourists (both Indian and foreign) in New Delhi. The market essentially is a long line of boutique stores selling products which cannot be found in today's malls and showrooms of the city. It is also one of the oldest markets of New Delhi with establishment of some boutiques dating back to 1950. It is most popular for the exquisite Pashmina Shawl from Kashmir. Most markets in Delhi are known to carry duplicates however one can find the original quality here. Among other exquisite items are the Kashmiri wool shawls and scarves, Indian Kurtis and Churidars brass ornaments and artefacts, carpets and other gift items. The Indian Tourist Office is on the corner of Janpath and Connaught Lane, and good maps can be purchased there. Between Fire Lane and the Imperial Hotel, the Tibetan Market can be found which has a wide range of Himalayan arts and crafts. Musical instruments, wall hangings and bead shops are in abundance. Behind the Tibetan Market, on Tolstoy Marg, is the Jantar Mantar, an astrological instrument of immense proportions.

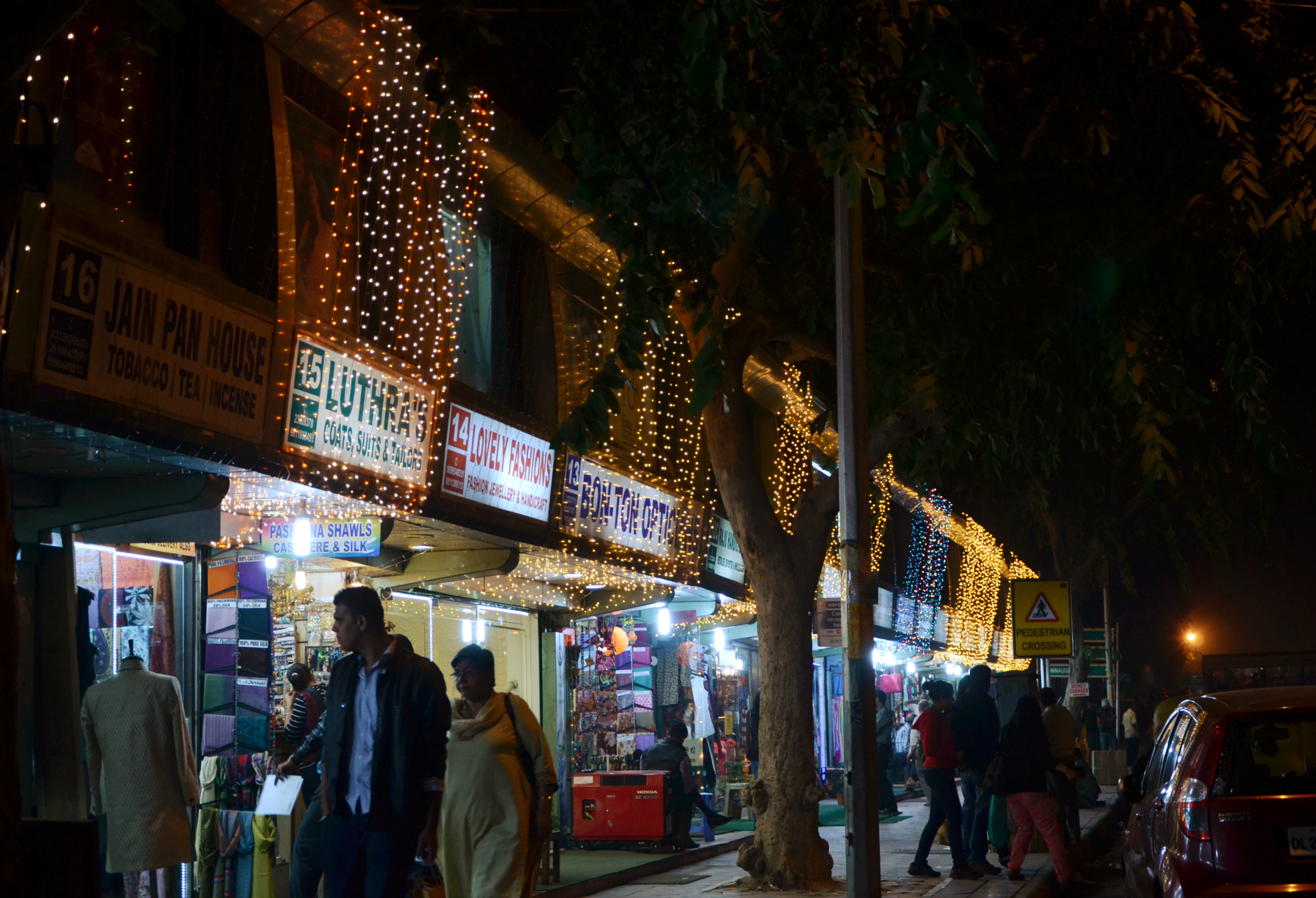
Night view of Janpath

The Janpath Market also has an abundance of walking vendors who sell trinkets, such as necklaces, chunky jewellery, jootis, handicraft items. drums, horns and postcards, particularly to foreigners, most of whom now know about the bargaining required.

== Junctions & intersections ==
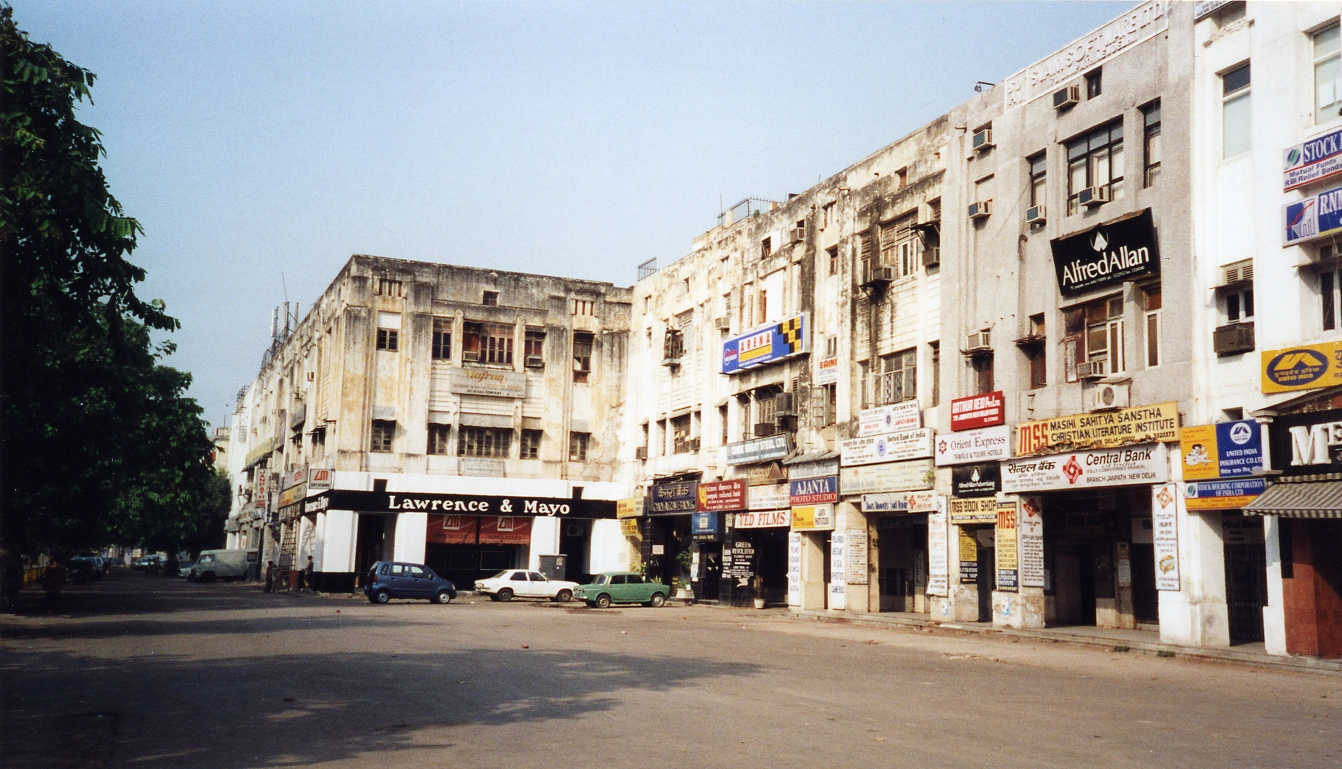
Janpath commercial area, 2006

- Intersection with Rajpath
- Intersection of Akbar road and Motilal Nehru Marg, Dr. Rajendra Prashad road and Maulana Azad road.
- One junction is at Windsor place, where intersection of Ashok road is made by junction of Ferozshah road and Raisina road.

== Janpath Metro Station ==
Janpath Metro Station; part of Phase III of the Delhi Metro Project by The Delhi Metro Rail Corporation (DMRC). The Janpath Metro Station is a part of the Violet Line (Delhi Metro). The Janpath metro station opened on 26 June 2014.

== Important buildings ==
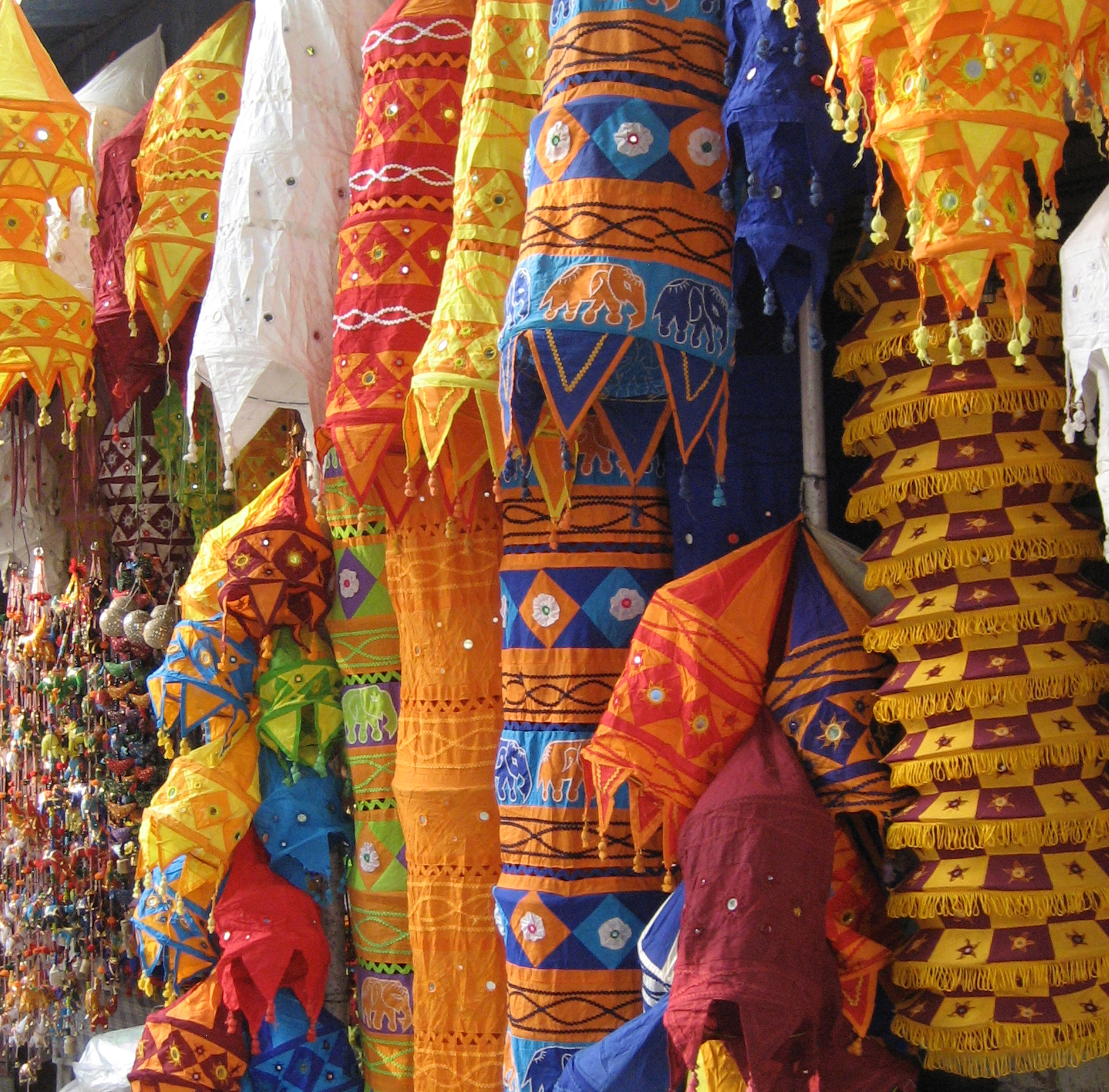
A Handicraft shop, on Janpath, New Delhi

- National Museum
- Indira Gandhi National Centre for the Arts (IGNCA)
- National Archives of India
- 10 Janpath, official residence of the former Congress Party president.
- 1, Janpath, official residence of the Chief Minister of Andhra Pradesh, Nara Chandrababu Naidu
- Hungarian Cultural Centre, 1 Janpath
- Hotels: The Imperial, Hotel Janpath, Le Merdien Hotel, Shangrila, Claridges hotel
- Restaurants: Beer Cafe, Pind Balluchi Janpath, CCD, 52 Janpath, Informal, Bunta Bar
- Central Cottage Industries Emporium
- Scindia House

== In popular culture ==
In popular culture it became the title, of noted play, titled Janpath Kiss (1976). It is mentioned in Daniel Odier's Tantric Quest, Encounter With Absolute Love (1996).
