= Race Course Road =

Road in New Delhi, India

Coordinates: 28.598426°N 77.202898°E

Race Course Road, officially named Lok Kalyan Marg, is a road in New Delhi, India. On the north-east end, it stretches from Rotary no. 31, the roundabout joining Rajaji Marg, Teen Murti Marg, Akbar Road, and Safdarjung Road. On the south-west end, it stretches up to Mustafa Kemal Atatürk Marg, at the entry of the race course. Its nearest metro station is the Lok Kalyan Marg station.

The Race Course Road houses both the Prime Minister of India's residence at 7, Race Course Road, and the Delhi Gymkhana, which can also be approached from Safdarjung Road. It is closed to public entry.

== History ==
The road was named after the Delhi Race Course, part of the Delhi Race Club, which was established in 1940.

In September 2016, Meenakshi Lekhi, a Lok Sabha MP from the Bharatiya Janata Party (BJP) and a member of the New Delhi Municipal Council (NDMC), proposed that Race Course Road be renamed 'Ekatma Marg'. She argued that the existing name did not "match with Indian culture" and that it conveyed "a feeling of disassociation". In contrast, she argued her proposed 'Ekatma Marg' was in line with the Hindu nationalist doctrine of integral humanism. The proposal was opposed by the Aam Aadmi Party (AAP), which then ruled the Delhi government. Surinder Singh, an AAP MLA, argued that the road's renaming should not reflect the ideology of the Rashtriya Swayamsevak Sangh (RSS), a Hindutva paramilitary organisation with close organisational and ideological links with the BJP. On 21 September 2016, the NDMC instead renamed the road 'Lok Kalyan Marg', stating that its former name did not "match with the Indian ethos and value system".

== See also ==
- Prime Minister's Office
- Dara Shikoh road
