= The Imperial, New Delhi =

Hotel in New Delhi, India

The Imperial New Delhi
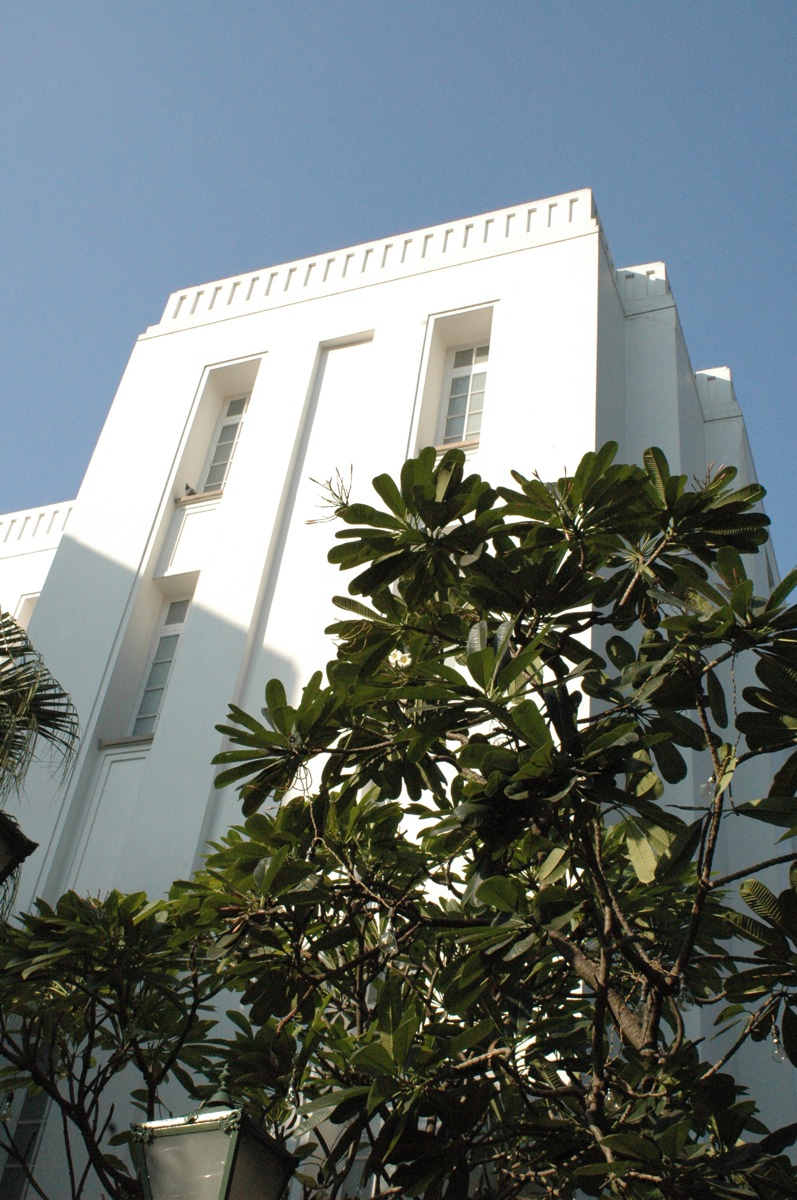

- Location within Delhi

General information
- Location: Janpath, New Dehli
- Coordinates: 28.6255°N 77.2158°E
- Opening: 1936
- Owner: Akoi family

Technical details
- Floor count: 3

Design and construction
- Architect: Blomfield

Other information
- Number of rooms: 235
- Number of suites: 44
- Number of restaurants: 6
- Number of bars: 2

Website
- theimperialindia.com

The Imperial New Delhi is a historic luxury hotel opened in 1936 in New Delhi, India. It is located on Janpath, close to Rajiv Chowk. It was New Delhi's first grand hotel. The hotel is owned by the Akoi family.

== History ==
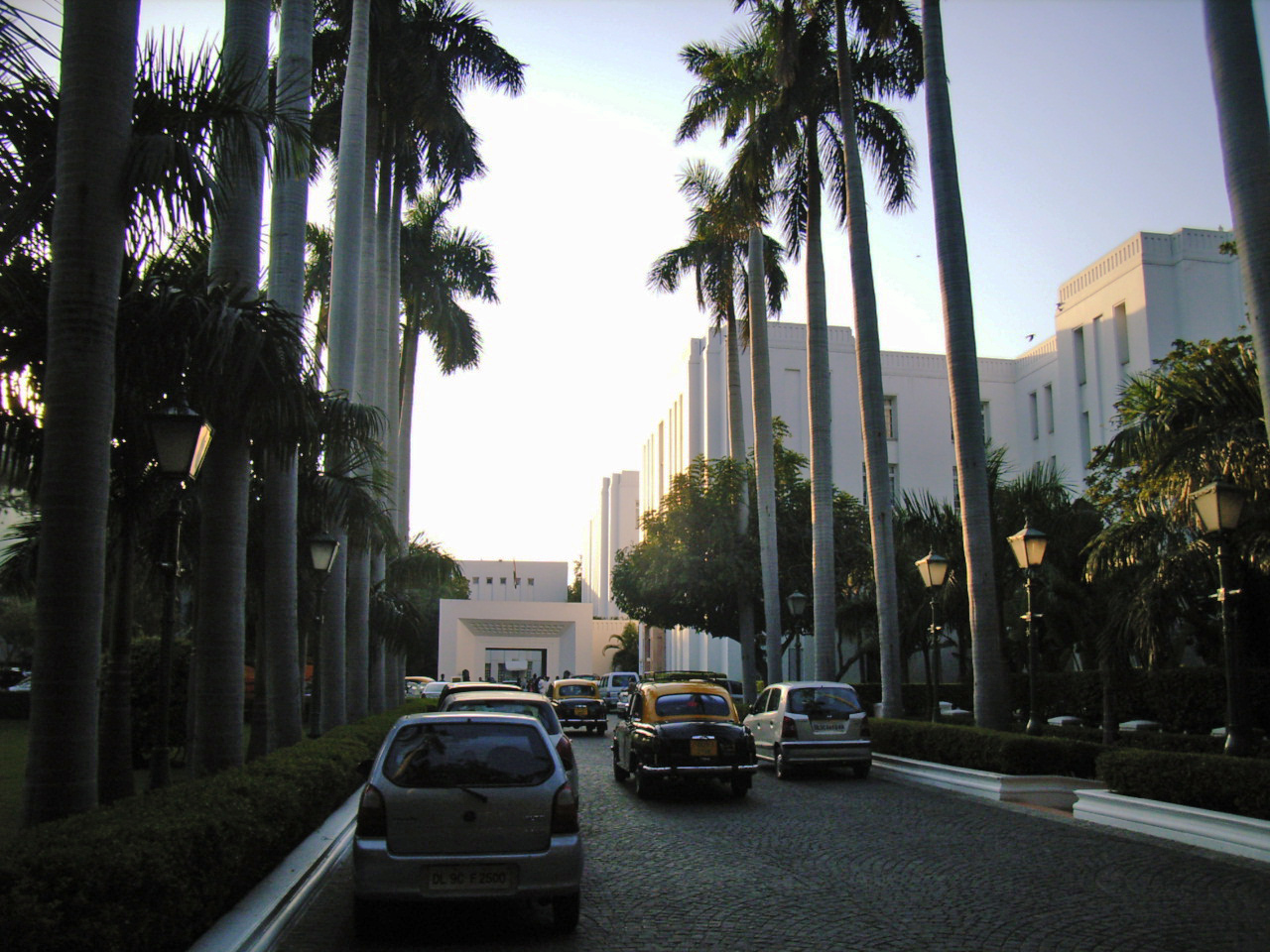
Palm trees lining the entrance of Imperial Hotel

The hotel was designed in a mix of Art Deco, Victorian and colonial styles by architect, F.B. Blomfield, an associate of Edwin Lutyens, who designed the new capital of the British Raj, New Delhi. The hotel was built by Sandhu Jat Jagirdar S.B.S. Ranjit Singh, son of R.B.S. Narain Singh, honoured by the British Raj, at the Coronation Durbar of 1911, when New Delhi was declared the new Capital of India.

The hotel was officially opened in 1936 by Lord Willingdon, the Viceroy of India. Also present was his wife, Lady Willingdon, who chose the hotel's name and conferred its lion insignia upon it.

The hotel underwent restoration under the leadership of its General Manager and Vice President, Mr. Harvinder Sekhon, spanning from 1996 to 2001. During his tenure, the Imperial hosted notable guests including the Queen of the Netherlands, Hollywood celebrities, adventurers, and business magnates. Sekhon also oversaw the opening of six distinctive restaurants and bars: "Spice Route," "Patiala Peg Bar," "1911 Restaurant and Bar," "Daniells Tavern," and "San Gimignano." For further details, refer to articles such as "New Delhi Hotel Opens Door to Art, Los Angeles Times, 7 December 1997, Associated Press" and "India: Fishlock's empire" by Mr. Trevor Fishlock, Daily Telegraph, London, 27 November 2000.

Today, the hotel has the largest collection of colonial and post-colonial art and artifacts anywhere in Delhi, and has a museum and an art gallery. The Imperial was awarded Travel + Leisure India's Best Award for Heritage Hotel in 2017, awarded Best Heritage Hotel by Outlook Traveller in 2018 and listed in the Conde Nast Gold List of best hotels in 2018 in amongst multiple other awards.

The hotel contains nine restaurants and eateries ranging from fine dining to bars, three function rooms, a spa, salon and nine styles of accommodation.

== Heritage ==
Hotel Imperial, New Delhi is well known for its heritage and legacy. It has a well known bar called 'Patiala Peg'. It was this hotel and the bar where Pandit Jawaharlal Nehru, Mahatma Gandhi, Mohammad Ali Jinnah and Lord Mountbatten met to discuss the Partition of India and the birth of Pakistan. It is also the name of a school in Aligarh.

== See also ==
- List of hotels in Delhi
