= Prithviraj Road =

- Posh Area of New Delhi
- Prithviraj Road New Delhi
- Location within Delhi
- Coordinates: 28°34′12.18″N 77°12′46.60″E
- Named for: Prithviraj Chauhan
- Area code: 110001

Prithviraj Road (Hindi: पृथ्वीराज मार्ग, Urdu: پرتھوی راج مارگ Pṛthvīrāj Mārg) is one of the historic & influential roads of New Delhi. It is known as the Billionaires' Row of New Delhi and has some of the most expensive real estate in the Country and the World. It houses the most elite residences of major people of India, including several Billionaires and Union Ministers.

== North End ==
It stretches from the Taj Mansingh Hotel at the junction of Man Singh Road, Aurangzeb road, Humayun Road, Shahjahan Road, a road to Khan Market.

== South End ==
It stretches up to the junction of Sri Aurobindo Marg Road, Safdarjung road and Tughlaq road. This is near Safdarjung's Tomb.

== Important buildings ==
- Rajasthan House
- Meghalaya House
- Jindal House
- J&K House
- Official Language institution, or Kendriya Hindi/ Rajbhasha Sansthan
- L.K.Advani's house: 30, Prithviraj Road.
- Cabinet Secretary's earmarked residence: 32, Prithviraj Road.
- Embassy of Spain: 12, Prithviraj Road.
- Punj House: 10, Prithviraj Road.

== Crossings ==
- Aurangzeb road
- South End Road.
