= Meenakshi Lekhi =

Indian politician

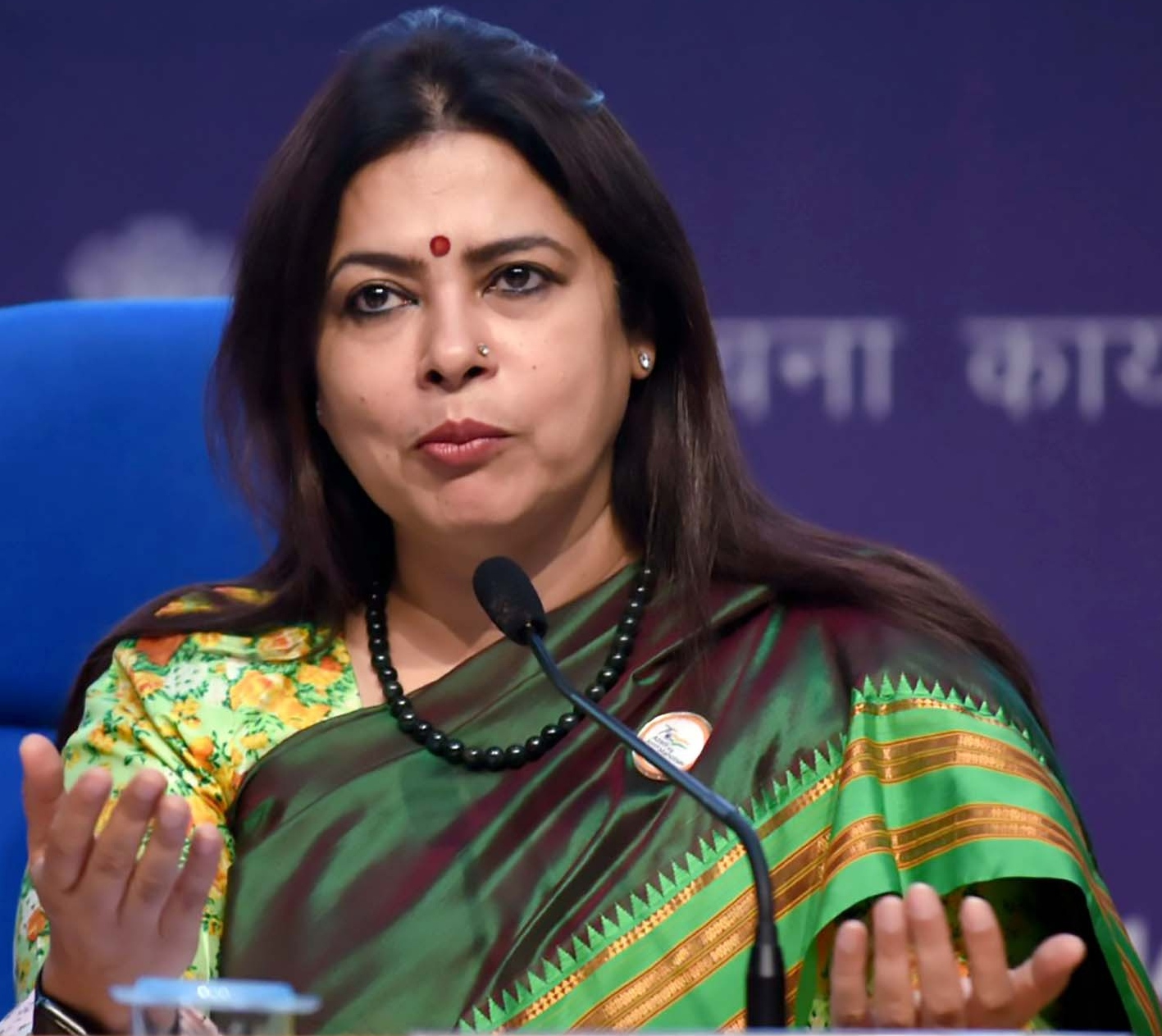

Minister of State for External Affairs
- In office 7 July 2021 – 11 June 2024 Serving with V. Muraleedharan & Rajkumar Ranjan Singh
- Prime Minister: Narendra Modi
- Minister: S. Jaishankar
- Succeeded by: Pabitra Margherita

Minister of State for Culture
- In office 7 July 2021 – 11 June 2024
- Prime Minister: Narendra Modi
- Minister: G. Kishan Reddy
- Preceded by: Prahlad Singh Patel
- Succeeded by: Rao Inderjit Singh

Member of Parliament, Lok Sabha
- In office 5 June 2014 – 4 June 2024
- Preceded by: Ajay Maken
- Succeeded by: Bansuri Swaraj
- Constituency: New Delhi

Chairperson of Public Undertakings Committee
- In office 30 October 2019 – 13 August 2021
- Preceded by: Shanta Kumar
- Succeeded by: Santosh Gangwar

Chairperson of Parliamentary Privileges Committee
- In office 20 July 2016 – 29 October 2019
- Preceded by: S. S. Ahluwalia
- Succeeded by: Harivansh Narayan Singh

Personal details
- Born: 30 April 1967 (age 59) New Delhi, India
- Party: Bharatiya Janata Party
- Spouse: Aman Lekhi
- Children: 2
- Education: Faculty of Law, University of Delhi
- Occupation: Lawyer; politician

Meenakshi Lekhi (born 30 April 1967) is an Indian politician who served as the Minister of State for External Affairs and Culture of India from 7 July 2021 till 10 June 2024. She was a Member of Parliament from New Delhi Parliamentary constituency in the 16th and 17th Lok Sabha from the Bharatiya Janata Party. She is also a lawyer in the Supreme Court of India.

She won the high-profile New Delhi parliamentary constituency as a BJP candidate in the 2014 elections and was re-elected in 2019. In July 2016, she was appointed as chairperson of the Committee on Privileges of the Lok Sabha in Parliament. On 26 July 2019, Lok Sabha speaker Om Birla appointed Lekhi as a chairperson of parliamentary committee on Public Undertakings and is continuing since then in that position.

Besides writing articles in journals, periodicals and newspapers on socio-political issues, she participates in various television shows on matters on national and international importance. Lekhi writes 'Forthwrite', a fortnightly column in The Week magazine. With her equal command over English and Hindi, she comes as a debater in the parliament where she has participated in numerous debates on matters of national importance in the Lok Sabha, such as debates on "intolerance" in India and the Triple Talaq Bill. She has also distinguished herself as an active participant in the various parliamentary processes and was awarded with the "Best Debut Women Parliamentarian" award by Lokmat in 2017.

== Education ==
Meenakshi Lekhi did her bachelor's degree (B.Sc.) from Hindu College, Delhi, Further, Lekhi joined the Campus Law Centre, Faculty of Law, University of Delhi from where she pursued her law degree (LLB) from 1987 to 1990.

After completing her law degree, she enrolled with the Delhi Bar Council in 1990, and started practising at the Supreme Court of India, Delhi High Court, and several other courts, tribunals and forums in different parts of the country.

== Legal career ==
She has practised in various courts, including several tribunals, Delhi High Court and the Supreme Court. She has also practised in a range of forums across India and handled a range of issues pertaining to women in the courts, such as domestic violence, family law disputes and most importantly the issue of permanent commission of the lady officers in the armed forces. Besides, she has been a social activist and has been associated with several institutions, including the National Commission for Women, Sakshi, NIPCD and several other organisations which are known for being protectors of the rights of women and children in the country.

Lekhi has been a part of the Drafting Committees for Bills like "Women's Reservation Bill" and "Sexual Harassment of Women at Workplace (Prevention, Prohibition and Redressal) Bill". The latter was passed by the Parliament.

Lekhi represented the media in court to get the ban on media coverage of case proceedings revoked. She was successful in this effort. She took up the case of the permanent commissioning of women in the Indian armed forces in the Supreme Court. Lekhi was also the lawyer of the victim in the Shanti Mukund Hospital rape case.

On 12 April 2019, Lekhi filed a criminal contempt case in the Supreme Court against the Congress Party President Rahul Gandhi for attributing his personal remark to the Supreme Court and creating prejudice in the minds of electorate by saying that the Supreme Court had accepted his (Rahul Gandhi's) contention that there was a scam in the rafale deal. Lekhi said that this amounted to misuse of the Supreme Court's order and hence constituted a clear contempt of court. In a separate verdict dated 10 April 2019 the Supreme Court had agreed to admit three secret stolen documents of the Ministry of Defence related to the Rafale deal file as admissible piece of evidence in the court, dismissing the government's contention that as per the Official Secrecy Act, such documents can't be admitted. However, Rahul Gandhi, while talking on the judgment with the media, had imputed his own words to the SC saying that the latter had agreed with his assertion that 'chowkidar chor hai' (the chowkidar is a thief) - a reference to PM Narendra Modi, who calls himself 'chowkidar' meaning 'the caretaker' or the guard.

== Political career ==
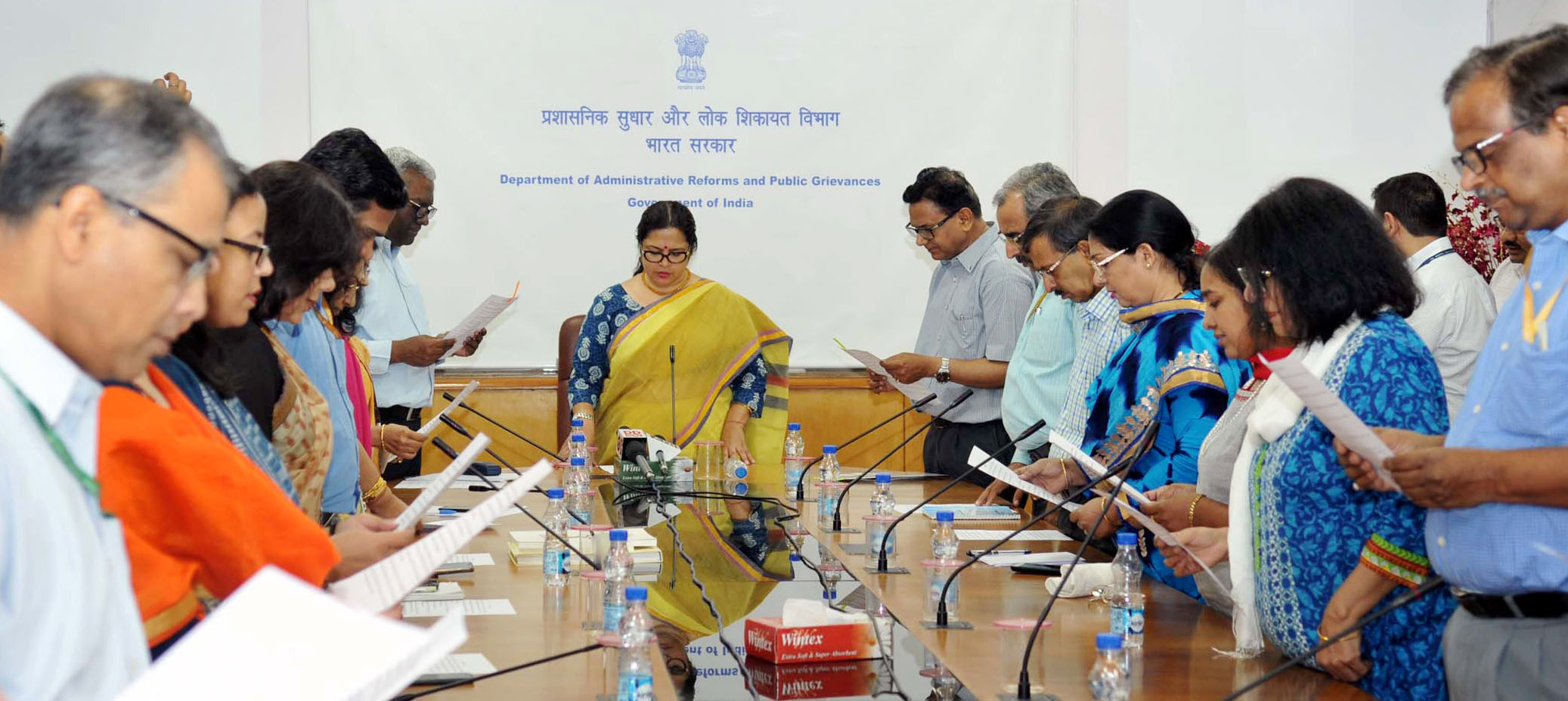
Meenakashi Lekhi, presiding over the Parliamentary Standing Committee on Personnel, Public Grievances, Law and Justice

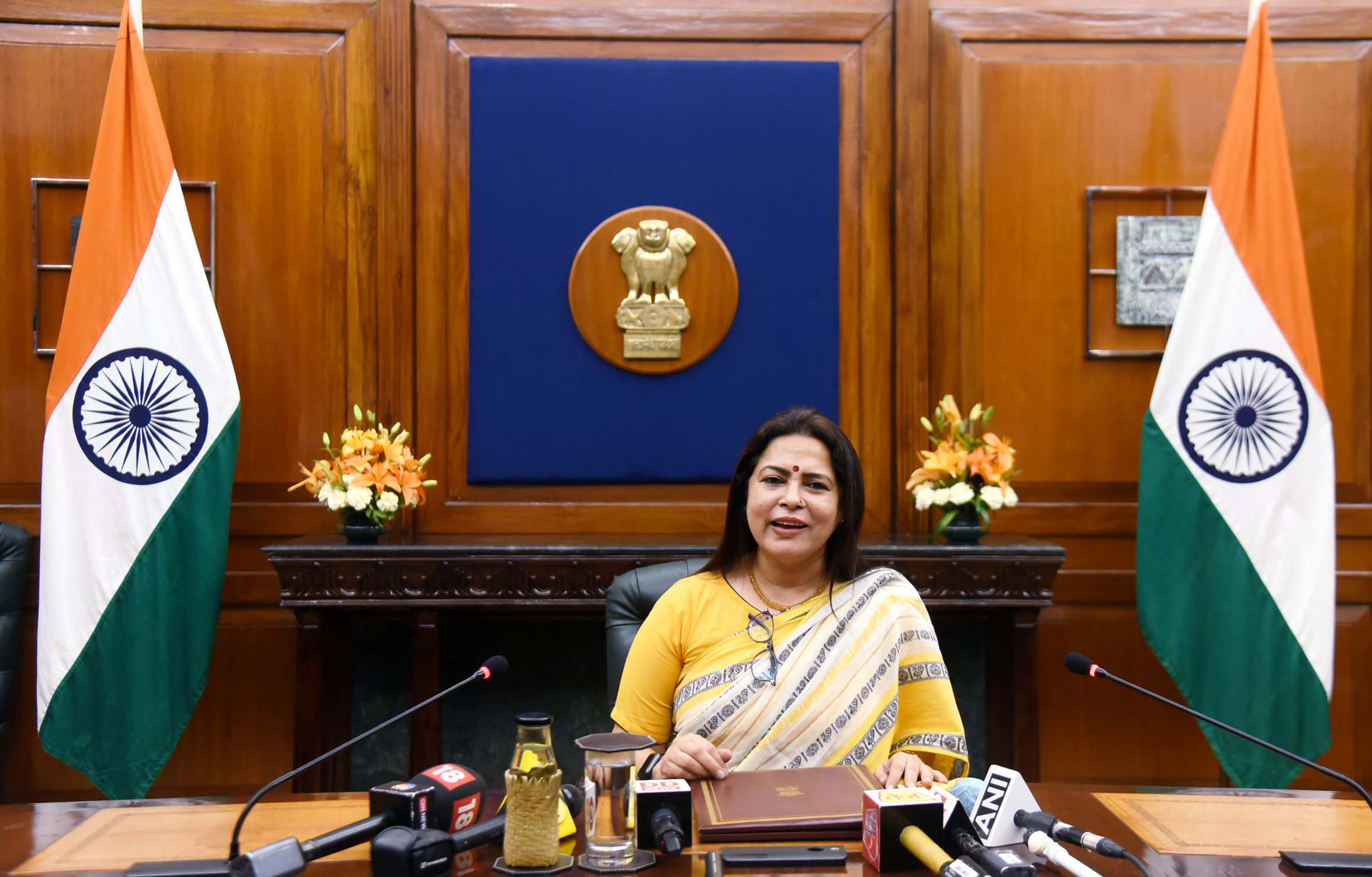
Meenakshi Lekhi taking charge as the Minister of State for External Affairs on July 08, 2021 at New Delhi.

Lekhi started her political career after joining the Bharatiya Janata Party. She quickly rose the ranks and was appointed as one of the vice-presidents of its women's wing, BJP Mahila Morcha in 2010 by the then party president Nitin Gadkari. Lekhi was later appointed as a National Spokesperson of the party in 2013. Lekhi was considered a strong supporter of the then Chief Minister of Gujarat Narendra Modi within the party. Lekhi contested in elections for the New Delhi constituency in the 2014 parliamentary general election and defeated incumbent Ajay Maken by a margin of 270,000 votes. In her capacity as Member of Parliament from the New Delhi constituency, Lekhi is currently a member of New Delhi Municipal Council (NDMC). She is the ex-officio Chairperson of the Commonwealth Women Parliamentarians (India chapter) and has been nominated as a member of the Press Council of India by the Lok Sabha Speaker. She was appointed the Chairperson of the Committee on Privileges of the Lok Sabha in July 2016 and is also currently an active member of the Standing Committee on Urban Development, Committee on Personnel, Law & Justice, Consultative Committee of Commerce and Committee of Housing.

On 28 August 2015, Ministry of Urban Development & NDMC approved the renaming of New Delhi's Aurangzeb Road as Dr. APJ Abdul Kalam Road. Lekhi, as member of the NDMC as well as the MP of the New Delhi constituency where the road is situated, had played important role in this decision. As a member of NDMC, she also got the name of Dalhousie Road, a road near the Secretariat Building, New Delhi, changed to Dara shikoh Road Earlier, she had been instrumental in changing the name of Race Course Road, the Delhi road adjacent to the Indian Prime Minister's residence, to Lok Kalyan Marg thus giving a new address to the PM's residence, from "7, RCR" to "7, LKM".

Lekhi has adopted the village Pilanji falling under her New Delhi parliamentary constituency to be developed as model village under the Sansad Adarsh Gram Yojana announced by Prime Minister Narendra Modi during his Independence Day address. However, as Pilanji is now an urbanised settlement with no gram sabha or village panchayat, as required under the scheme, she has also adopted the village Qutubgarh on the outskirts of Delhi that falls outside her constituency.

In July 2017, Lekhi was honoured with the Lokmat Parliamentary Award as "Best Debut Woman Parliamentarian".

In terms of utilisation of MPLAD funds among the 7 MPs of Delhi, Lekhi (New Delhi) had been found to spend the maximum amount. She used Rs 2.50 crore out of Rs 5 crore released by the government in the very first year, which was 50 per cent of the total released.

During a discussion on the Triple Talaq bill in Parliament in December 2017, Lekhi demanded stern punishment for the clerics and religious leaders who support and facilitate the process of instant triple talaq, known as talaq-i-biddat. Further, she had said: "I want to tell Muslim women, when you have a brother like Narendra Modi, you don't need to be afraid. We stand with you in this fight."

On the issue of growing incidents of lynching in India, she said that the incidents of mob lynching are due to economic disparity. Giving instances of the killing of Bengal migrant worker Manik Roy, who was beaten up by a group of men in Thiruvananthapuram in Kerala on the suspicion that he had stolen a hen, and a 30-year-old tribal man Madhu, who was beaten by an irate mob in Kerala on the accusation of theft, Lekhi told that many cases of lynchings happen due to poverty and economic issues.

She has been an active participant in the parliamentary processes. In the 16th Lok Sabha, Lekhi has participated in 125 debates (national average being 67.1), asked 435 questions (national average being 292) and introduced 20 private member bills (national average being 2.3) in the Lok Sabha (as updated till final Budget Session, 2019). Her overall attendance in parliament till budget session, 2019 has been 95% against the national average of 80%.

Lekhi was reelected in the 2019 general elections against congress party candidate Ajay Maken in New Delhi constituency of New Delhi (Lok Sabha constituency). Lekhi got nearly 54 per cent of votes against only 26 per cent of votes of nearest candidate Ajay Maken .

On 26 July 2019, Lok Sabha speaker Om Birla appointed Lekhi as a chairperson of parliamentary committee on Public Undertakings.

On 20 May 2020, during the Wuhan coronavirus outbreak, Lekhi, along with Rahul Kaswan, attended the swearing in ceremony of Tsai Ing-wen as president of Taiwan and praised Taiwan as a "Democratic Country".

== Controversies ==
=== 'Bharat Mata ki Jai' Chanting ===
Meenakshi Lekhi sparked controversy at the 'Awake Youth Conclave 2024' in Kozhikode, Kerala, on February 3. While addressing the audience, she urged them to chant 'Bharat Mata Ki Jai'. When some did not respond loud enough, she became visibly agitated, insisting on full participation. She singled out a woman in yellow, asking her to stand and chant or leave. Lekhi also praised Kerala Governor Arif Mohammed Khan for his past political stands during her speech. The conclave was organized by the Nehru Yuva Kendra, Khelo India, and Tapasya. Critics point to Supreme Court of India rulings, highlighting the right not to be compelled to stand or sing the national anthem, as exemplified by cases like Bijoe Emmanuel & Ors vs State of Kerala & Ors. (1986) and Shyam Narayan Chouksey vs Union of India (2018).

=== Allegations of political Abuse ===
The Enforcement Directorate (ED) has faced accusations of being used as a political tool, particularly against opposition parties. Critics argue that the agency has been selectively targeting opposition leaders, conducting raids, and making arrests, especially during election periods. In March 2024, 14 opposition parties filed a petition with the Supreme Court alleging misuse of the ED. Senior advocate A M Singhvi, representing the petitioners, argued that the number of politicians investigated by the ED had drastically risen after 2014, with 95% of those investigated belonging to opposition parties.

The allegations of misuse have been further fueled by incidents such as the one in August 2023, when Meenakshi Lekhi from the Bharatiya Janata Party (BJP) warned opposition members during a parliamentary debate, saying, "keep quiet, or ED may arrive at your home."

== Social works ==
Lekhi has been a member of the National Commission for Women's special committee, Chairperson of the Special Task Force on Women Empowerment, Vice Chairperson of JPM, Blind School (New Delhi) and Joint Secretary of the Blind Relief Association, Delhi.

In April 2015, she was part of a national environment awareness program, hosted by Women Can, a non-government organisation. She awarded 500 tree saplings to awarded students. The students had been a part of a quiz contest conducted across India through the initiative of Women Can, with the help of student volunteer Apoorv Jha, who published a quiz book and designed the quizzes.

As she was associated with several NGOs, she also worked with Swadeshi Jagaran Manch, an organisation associated with Sangh Parivar and from there she was invited by ex-BJP president Nitin Gadkari to join BJP in its Mahila Morcha (women's wing) as its vice-president and from there her political career took off.

== See also ==
- Dara Shikoh Road
