= Aurangzeb Road =

Road in New Delhi, India

Coordinates: 28.599406°N 77.215991°E

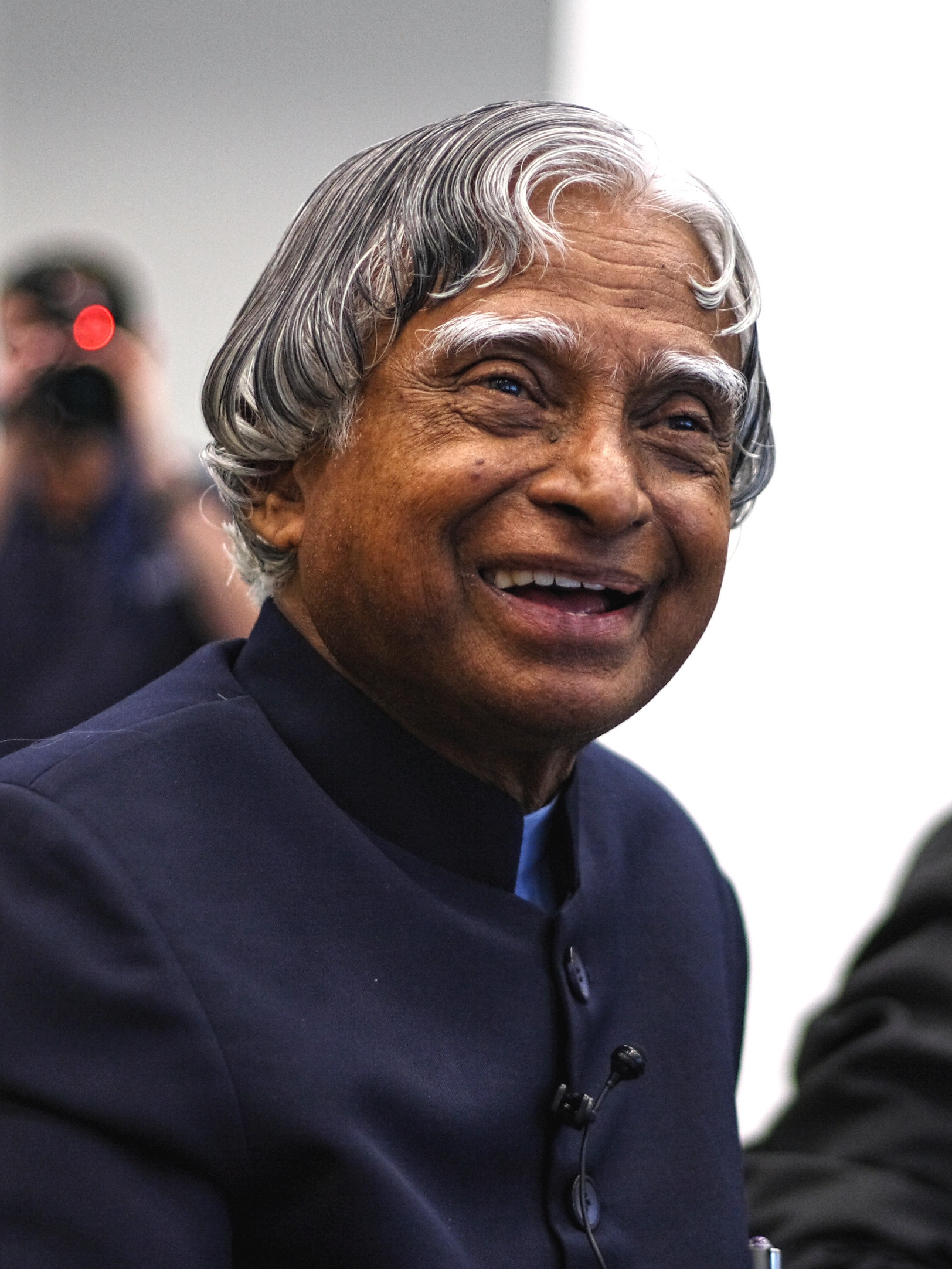
A P J Abdul Kalam

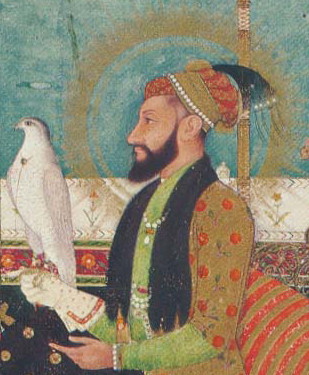
Emperor Aurangzeb

Aurangzeb road (officially known as Dr APJ Abdul Kalam Road) is a road in New Delhi, India. It lies at the north-east end, stretching from the 'Taj Mansingh Hotel' at the roundabout of Mansingh Road, Shahjahan Road, Humayun Road, Prithviraj Road and a road to Khan Market in the north-east. At the south-west end it stretches up to the crossing at Mustafa Kemal Atatürk Marg and Safdarjung Road junction.

It is home to several Indian billionaires such as ArcelorMittal's L N Mittal, K P Singh of DLF and Max Healthcare's Analjit Singh.

== Dr. APJ Abdul Kalam ==
Dr. APJ Abdul Kalam (1931–2015) was an Indian scientist and politician. He served as the 11th president of India from 2002 to 2007. Kalam was a leading figure in India's space program and missile development, earning him the nickname "Missile Man of India". He also played a role in India's nuclear tests. Known for his down-to-earth personality, Kalam was popular with the public and is known as the "People's President." After his presidency, he continued to be active through education and writing. He died in 2015 at the age of 83.

== Junction ==
A single junction is formed at the crossing of Tughlaq road, land on this road is worth ₹ 500 Crore (roughly $80 million) per acre.

== 2014 renaming ==
Dr APJ Abdul Kalam Road was earlier called Aurangzeb Road, named so by the British after the Mughal emperor Aurangzeb. In November 2014, Delhi Sikh Gurdwara Management Committee petitioned the Prime Minister of India to change the name of Aurangzeb Road after Guru Tegh Bahadur, the ninth Sikh guru, as a tribute to him on his martyrdom anniversary observed on 24 November. Guru Tegh Bahadur was executed in Delhi on the orders of the Mughal Emperor Aurangzeb. Canadian writer and activist of Pakistani origin, Tarek Fatah, suggested renaming Aurangzeb Road to Dara Shikoh Road, after Dara Shikoh, the brother of Aurangzeb, who was executed by the latter.

Aurangzeb Road was renamed to Dr APJ Abdul Kalam Road by NDMC on request of Maheish Girri (BJP Member of the India Parliament for East Delhi) on 29 August 2015.

"As a tribute to the People's President, I propose to rename the 'Aurangzeb Road' in New Delhi to 'Dr APJ Abdul Kalam Road'. In my opinion, this will be a great way of preserving his memories and legacy forever," wrote Maheish Girri for changing the name of the Road.

=== Criticism ===
The Renaming of Aurangzeb road to Dr APJ Abdul Kalam Road also got criticism from various sections of historians and politicians, such as Sharad Yadav of Janata Dal (United), Bahujan Samaj Party president Mayawati, Tariq Anwar of Nationalist Congress Party and Asaduddin Owaisi of AIMIM.

== See also ==
- Dara Shikoh Road
- Race Course Road
