= Dara Shikoh Road =

Road in Central Delhi, India named after Dara Shikoh

Dara Shikoh Road is the name given to a road in Central Delhi to honour Dara Shikoh, a Mughal prince who was the heir apparent of Shah Jahan. The road was originally named Dalhousie Road, after Lord Dalhousie. This road is located just 2 km from Rashtrapati Bhavan.

== Dara Shikoh ==
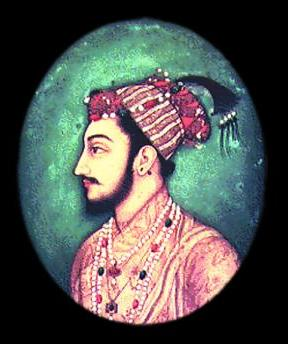
Prince Dara Shikoh

Dara Shikoh, also transliterated as Dara Shukoh, (20 March 1615 – 30 August 1659) was the eldest son and heir-apparent of the Mughal emperor Shah Jahan. Dara was designated with the title Padshahzada-i-Buzurg Martaba (lit. 'Prince of High Rank') and was favoured as a successor by his father and his elder sister, Princess Jahanara Begum. He had been given the title of 'Shah-e-Buland Iqbal' by Shah Jahan. In the war of succession which ensued after Shah Jahan's illness in 1657, Dara was defeated by his younger brother Prince Muhiuddin (later, the Emperor Aurangzeb). He was executed in 1659 on Aurangzeb's orders in a bitter struggle for the imperial throne.

The new namesake, was a patron of the arts as well, Dara Shikoh's legacy extends beyond religious tolerance, encompassing a deep appreciation for Indian culture.

== Renaming ==
Dalhousie Road, located less than 2 kilometers from the Rashtrapati Bhawan, previously bore the name of the 1st Marquess of Dalhousie, the Governor-General of India from 1848 to 1856.

The proposal was first moved in 2014 for renaming Aurangzeb Road after Dara Shikoh. However, after former President APJ Abdul Kalam died, the road was renamed in his honour.

The municipal body passed the new proposal on 6 Feb 2017, put forward by BJP MP Meenakshi Lekhi, who was also a council member, to this effect at a special meeting convened by its chairman, Naresh Kumar. It came effect on the same day.

== Criticism ==
The renaming of Dalhousie Road sparked a conversation about the importance of remembering historical figures who championed tolerance and intellectual pursuits. While some may debate the necessity of renaming historical landmarks, this shift undeniably reflects a desire to celebrate figures who embody the values of a pluralistic society. AAP MLA Surinder Singh questioned the timing of the recommendation in view of assembly polls in four states.

== See also ==
- Dara Shikoh
- Race Course Road
