= Tees January Road =

Road in Delhi, India

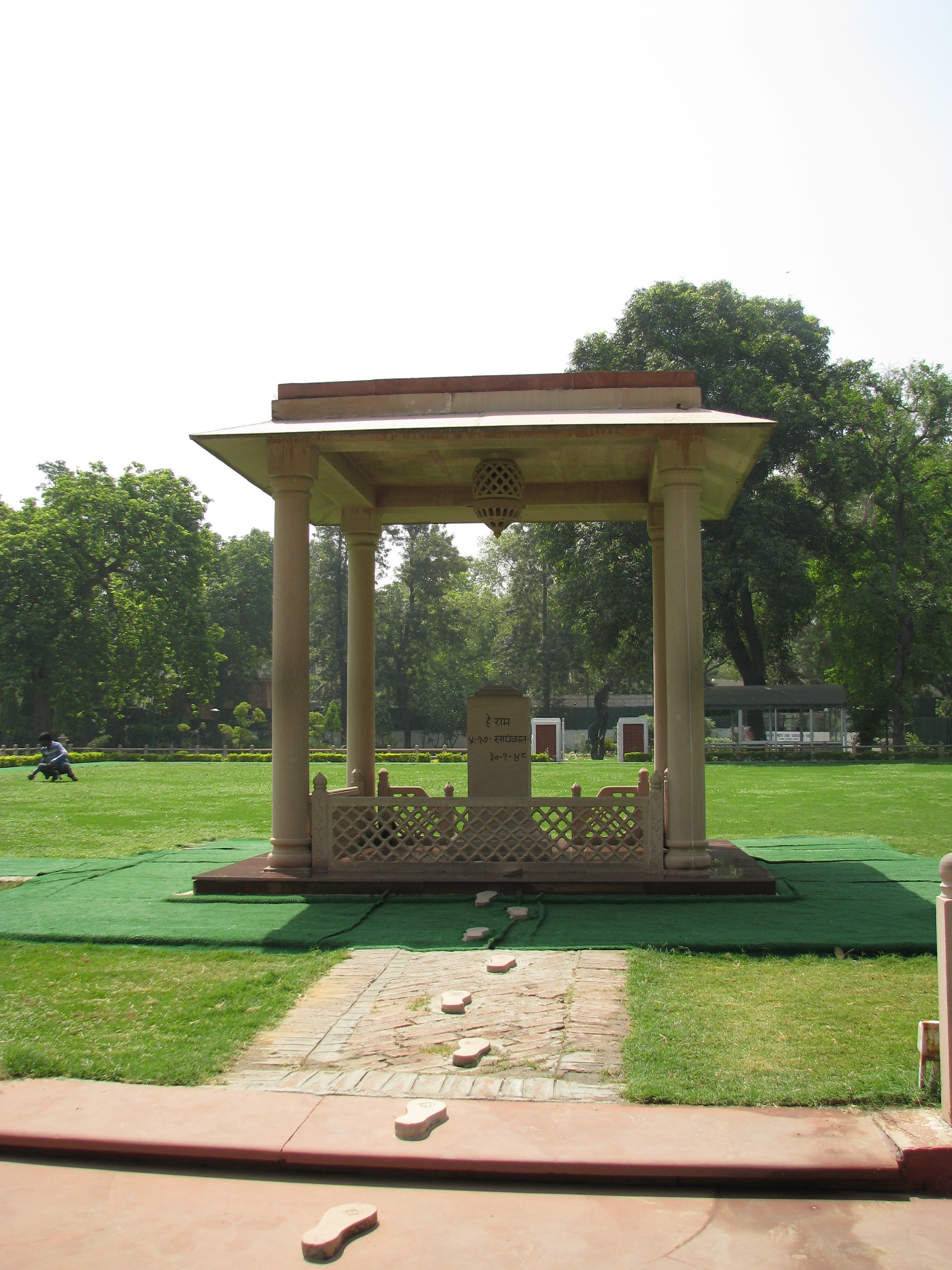
The Martyr's Column at the Gandhi Smriti, the spot where Mahatma Gandhi was assassinated.

Tees January Marg is a marg (road) in New Delhi, Delhi, India. It was formerly called Albuquerque Road. The name of the road, 30 (tees in Hindi) January, commemorates the death of Mohandas Gandhi on 30 January 1948.

Gandhi spent the last five months of his life (144 days) as a guest of the Birla family at Birla House at 5 Tees January Marg. The Birla residence was purchased by the Government of India in 1966 to house the Gandhi Smriti. Adjoining the Gandhi Smriti, at 6 Tees January Marg, is the National Defence College of India.

The New Delhi Municipal Council (NDMC), Delhi's civic body, in 2008 unveiled major plans, first announced in 2006, to renovate Tees January Marg, Tees January Lane, and other adjacent roundabouts at an estimated cost of ₹7,63,00,000 — ₹7.63 crore (equivalent to ₹21 crore or US$2.2 million in 2023). The plan involved development of frontage in front of Gandhi Smriti's new pedestrian paths, street lighting, horticulture, irrigation lines on both sides of the roads, and shifting car and bus parking from in front of Tees January Marg, Gandhi Smriti, and Claridges Hotel to Tees January Lane, where new parking areas were to be developed.
