= Safdarjung Road =

Road in New Delhi, India

Coordinates: 28.598087°N 77.207601°E

Safdarjung Road is a main road in New Delhi, India, named after the 18th century Tomb of Safdarjung near it. At the north end, the road stretches from the junction of the Teen Murti Marg, Akbar Road, Rajaji Marg and Race Course Road, which is a roundabout. At the south end, it stretches up to the junction of Prithviraj Road, Tughlaq Road and Sri Aurobindo Marg. There is a single junction/crossing at the Mustafa Kemal Atatürk Marg and Dr APJ Abdul Kalam Road section.

Former Prime Minister Manmohan Singh stayed at 19 Safdarjung Road until he became PM in May 2004.

== Important places ==
The residence of the former Prime Minister of India, Indira Gandhi is located at 1, Safdarjung Road. She was assassinated there on 31 October 1984, by two of her bodyguards, while going towards the neighbouring 1, Akbar Road Congress office for an interview. The guards carried grievances against her for the way she had handled Operation Blue Star. The prime minister's house was subsequently turned into the ‘Indira Gandhi Memorial Museum’.

Prior to being the Prime Minister's office, this was the residence of former Chief Justice of India Sudhi Ranjan Das.
