= Alak Ray =

Indian astrophysicist

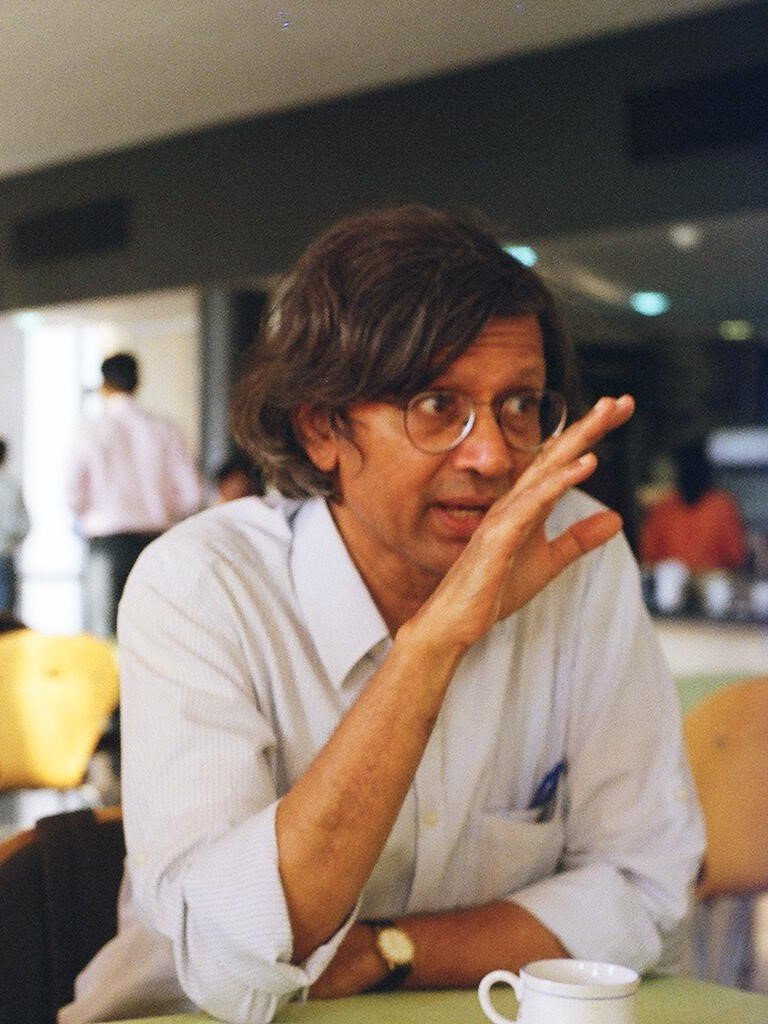
- Alak Ray at TIFR
- Born: India
- Citizenship: Indian
- Scientific career
- Fields: Astronomy, Physics, Astrophysics
- Workplaces: NASA Goddard Space Flight Center, Tata Institute of Fundamental Research
- Thesis: "Thermal conduction and cooling of young neutron stars" (1979)
- Doctoral advisor: Malvin Ruderman

Alak Ray is an Indian astronomer and high-energy astrophysicist, who works on neutron stars, supernovae and GRBs.

== Education ==
Alak Ray received his B.Sc. degree from Calcutta University in 1970. He earned his Ph.D. (1979) at the Columbia University, under the supervision of Malvin Ruderman.

== Career ==
During 1979–1981, Ray worked at University of California, Irvine as a postdoctoral research associate. In 1981 he moved back to India to join the Tata Institute of Fundamental Research, where he served as reader, associate professor and then professor. Between the years of 1996 and 1998, he took a sabbatical as senior research associate at NASA's Goddard Space Flight Center.

With Brian Cameron and Poonam Chandra in 2004, Ray discovered the first radio counterpart of a Soft gamma repeater, SGR 1806−20.

Along with Alicia Soderberg and Sayan Chakraborti in 2009, Ray discovered the first relativistic outflow from a Supernova without a detected Gamma-ray burst.

In collaboration with Sayan Chakraborti, Naveen Yadav, and Carolin Cardamone in 2012, Ray discovered the presence of strong magnetic fields in Green Pea Galaxies.

At the Tata Institute of Fundamental Research Ray supervised the doctoral research of many researchers, including Nandivada Rathnasree who was elected the Director of the Nehru Planetarium, and Sayan Chakraborti who was elected Junior Fellow of the Harvard Society of Fellows.

== Honors ==
Ray was awarded a Fulbright Fellowship in 2014. He was elected to the International Astronomical Union in 1985.
