= Nandivada Rathnasree =

Indian astronomer and science historian (1963–2021)

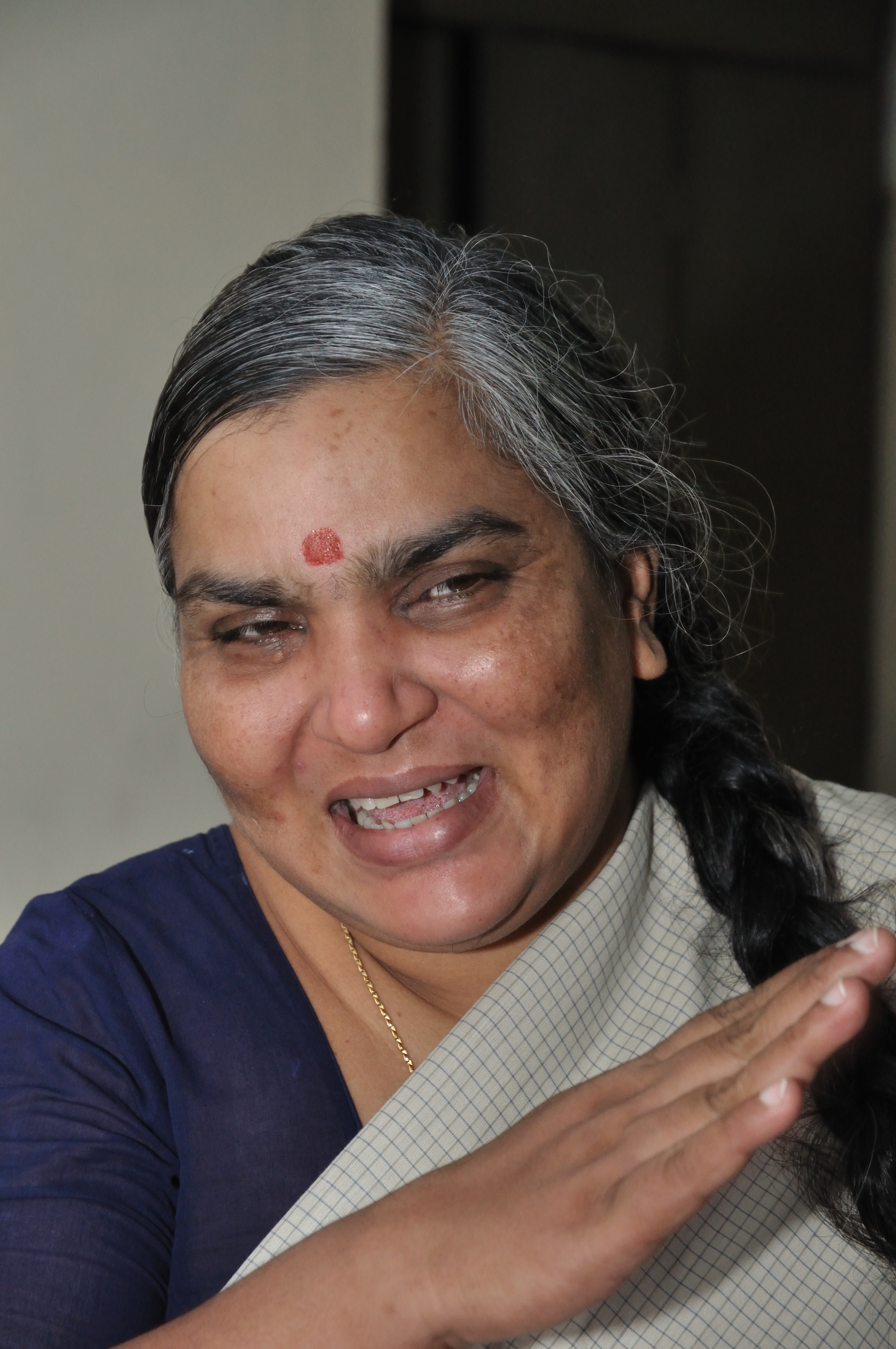
- Rathnasree in 2011
- Born: 26 November 1963; India
- Died: 9 May 2021 (aged 57)
- Education: Tata Institute of Fundamental Research
- Scientific career
- Fields: Astrophysics, science communication
- Workplaces: Nehru Planetarium
- Academic advisors: Alak Ray

Nandivada Rathnasree (26 November 1963 – 9 May 2021) or N. Rathnasree was an Indian astrophysicist, science communicator, and science historian, who was the director of India's Nehru Planetarium for over twenty years. She was responsible for improvements to the planetarium, as well as for researching the use of historical architectural astronomical instruments in India. She is known for her work in science communication.

== Life and education ==
N. Rathnasree spent her childhood in the state of Andhra Pradesh. She completed her undergraduate education at the University College for Women in Hyderabad, and completed a master's degree in physics from Hyderabad Central University. She completed a Ph.D. at the Tata Institute of Fundamental Research (TIFR), where she was their first doctoral student, studying binary stars in the Large Magellanic Cloud under the supervision of physicist Alak Ray. She married fellow physicist Patrick Dasgupta, and they had one son.

She died of COVID-19 in May 2021.

== Career ==
N. Rathnasree continued her research into radio observations of pulsars at the University of Vermont between 1992 and 1994, and at the Raman Research Institute in Bengaluru until 1996. While working in the United States, she was an observer at the Arecibo Radio Telescope in Puerto Rico, where she researched the stability of radio emissions from pulsars.

In 1996, she was invited to join the administration at the Nehru Planetarium in New Delhi and became the director of the planetarium in 1999. She served as the director of the planetarium for a period of 21 years, during which she upgraded the planetarium's mechanisms from an opto-mechanical to a hybrid system, which used digital as well as mechanical projection. In addition, she conducted a number of supervised research and outreach programs aimed at students. She introduced a number of public watch events to observe astronomical phenomena, as well as to commemorate major scientific researchers.

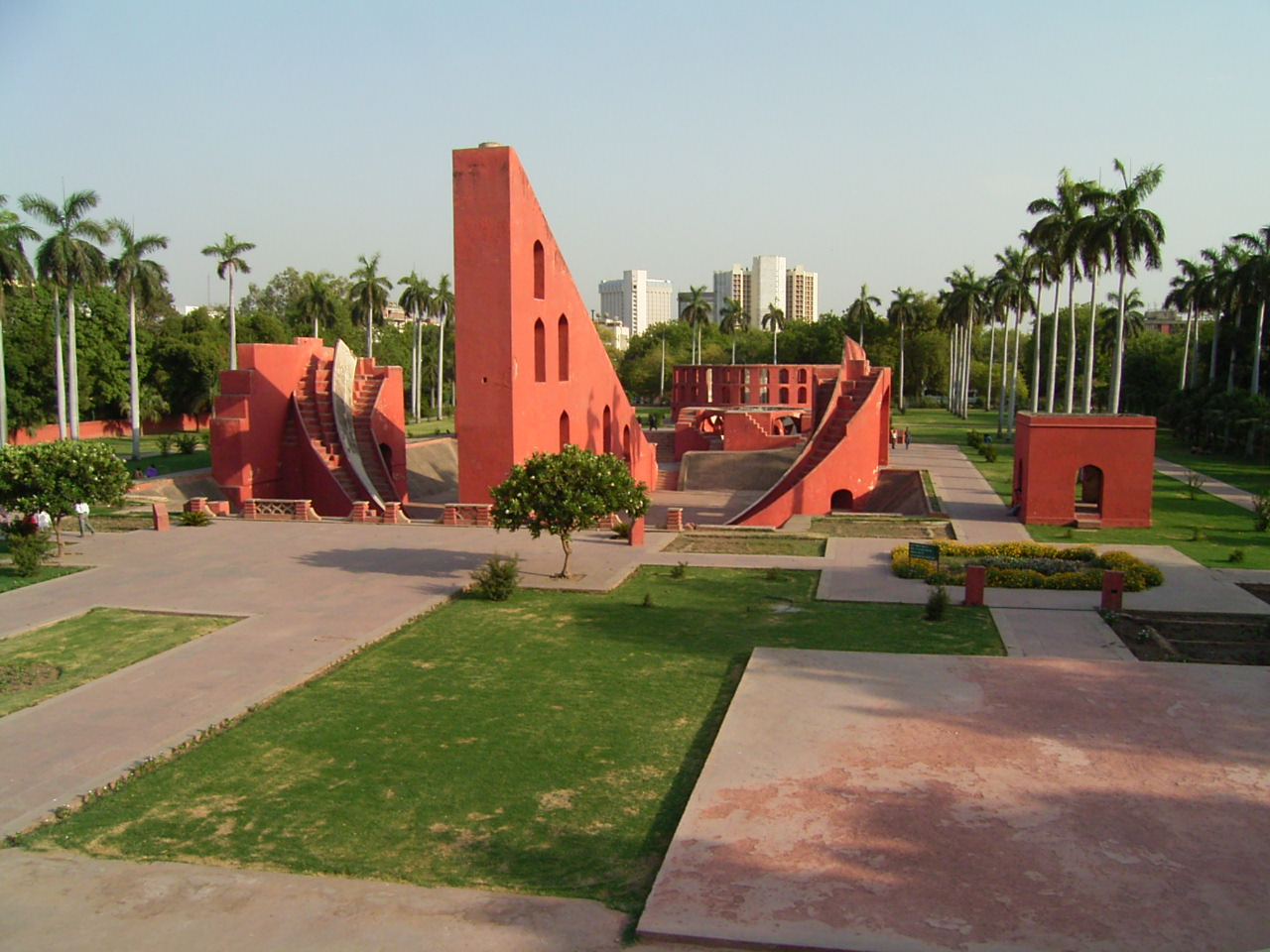
The Jantar Mantar in Delhi

In the early 2000s, she began research into the use of historical architectural structures that were intended to function as astronomical instruments. These structures, known as Jantar Mantar, were established in several locations in India. Rathnasree worked with the stone Jantar Mantars established in Delhi, Jaipur, Ujjain, and Varanasi, teaching students and researchers their uses, and publishing several research papers on their historical use and design. Rathnasree proposed that the stone-built Jantar Mantar observatories could be used when teaching astronomy to today's students. She later worked with the Archaeological Survey of India on a project to restore the Delhi Jantar Mantar. During the International Astronomical Union Symposium (IAUS340) on Solar Physics, at Jaipur in 2018, she introduced the Jaipur Jantar Mantar to researchers.

She was a member of the Astronomical Society of India, and in 2014, she was appointed to chair their Public Outreach and Education Committee, where she directed a number of programs aimed at improving the communication of scientific ideas and concepts to laypeople. In 2019, to commemorate the 150th anniversary of Mahatma Gandhi's birth, she compiled a collection of his writing on astronomy and devised a trail that visited locations of astronomical interest that he had visited. She worked with the National Council of Science Museums as an advisor on astronomy-related communications, and was also the chief editor for science-related publications for the National Council of Educational Research and Training. She was a vocal opponent of astrology, and wrote publicly to criticise a decision by the Indian University Grants Commission to introduce it as a subject to be taught in higher education. She also advocated against light pollution in India.
