= Prime Ministers' Museum and Library =

Government museum and library in New Delhi, India

Pradhanmantri Sangrahalaya

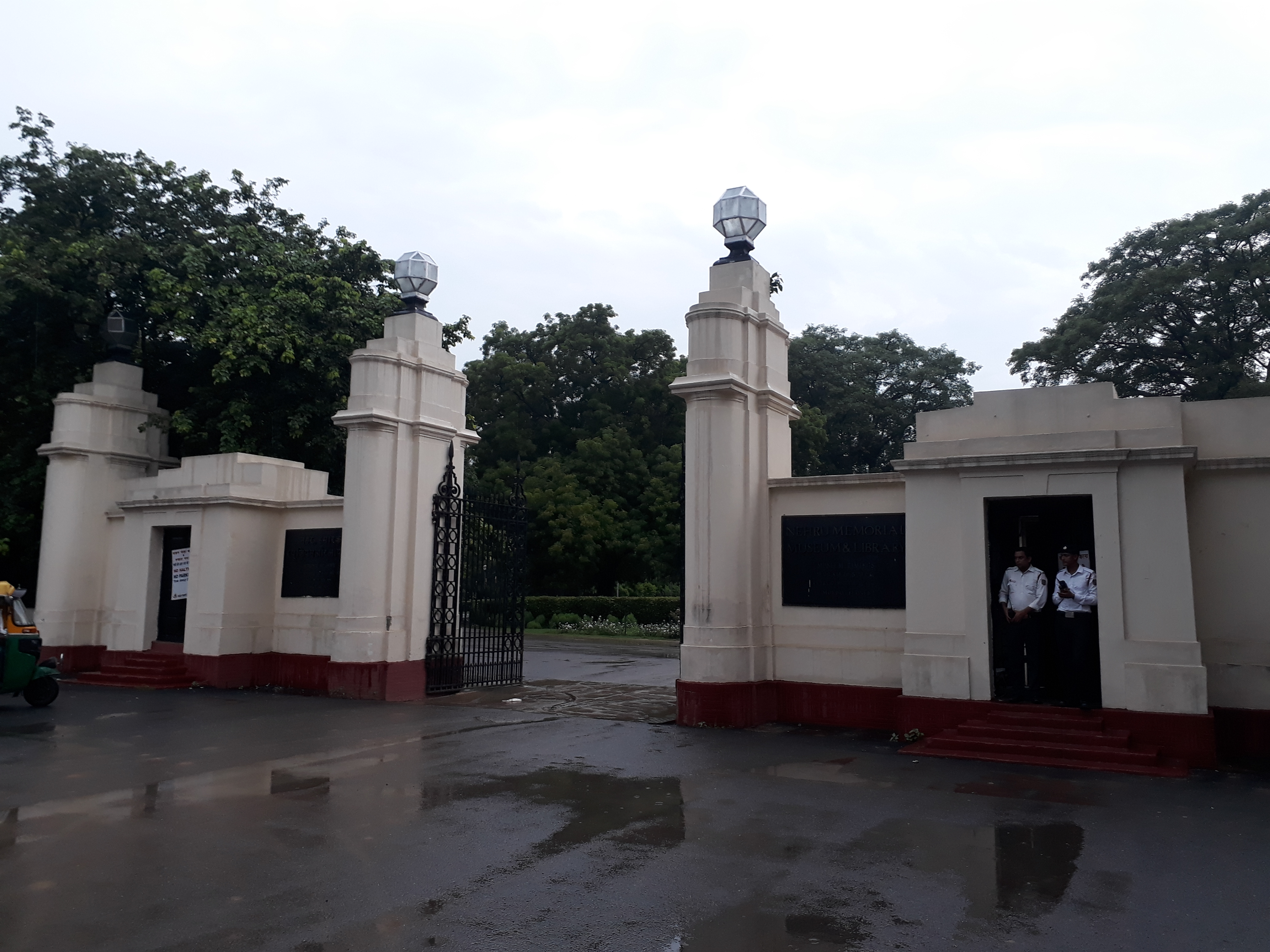
- Entrance of Prime Ministers' Museum and Library
- Established: 1964; 62 years ago
- Location: Teen Murti Bhavan, Haifa Chowk, New Delhi, India
- Coordinates: 28.6026029°N 77.1987395°E
- Type: Biographical museum
- Director: Ashwani Lohani
- Curators: Prime Ministers' Museum and Library Society
- Architect: Sikka Associates Architects
- Owners: Prime Ministers’ Museum and Library Society, Ministry of Culture
- Public transit access: Udyog Bhawan metro station
- Website: pmsangrahalaya.gov.in

Pradhanmantri Sangrahalaya (lit. 'Prime Ministers' Museum') or the Prime Ministers' Museum and Library, is a public museum and library in the Teen Murti Bhavan complex in New Delhi, India. It is curated and managed by the Prime Ministers' Museum and Library Society, an autonomous institution under the aegis of the Ministry of Culture, and is dedicated to chronicling the lives, contributions, and legacies of all prime ministers of India since Independence in 1947.

It was previously known as the Nehru Memorial Museum and Library (NMML) and was run by the Nehru Memorial Museum and Library Society before being renamed and expanded in April 2022 by the Modi government. It was originally founded in 1964 to preserve and reconstruct the history of the Indian independence movement, after the death of India's first prime minister Jawaharlal Nehru, and to foster academic research on modern and contemporary Indian history.

== History ==
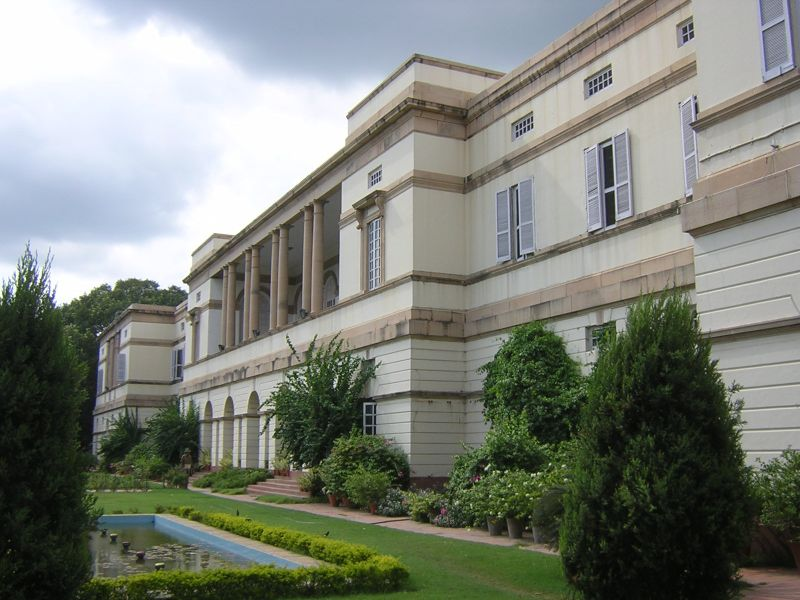
Teen Murti Bhavan, where the library functioned from 1966 to 1974.

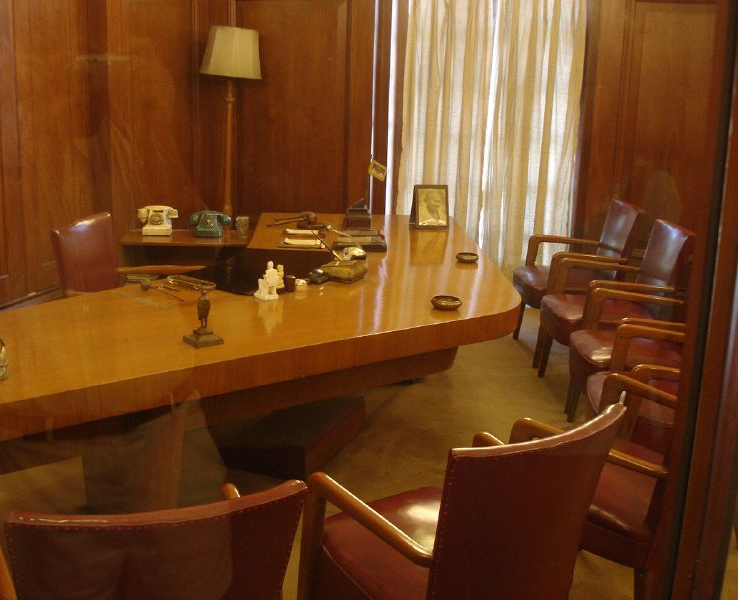
Study of Jawaharlal Nehru, preserved within the museum.

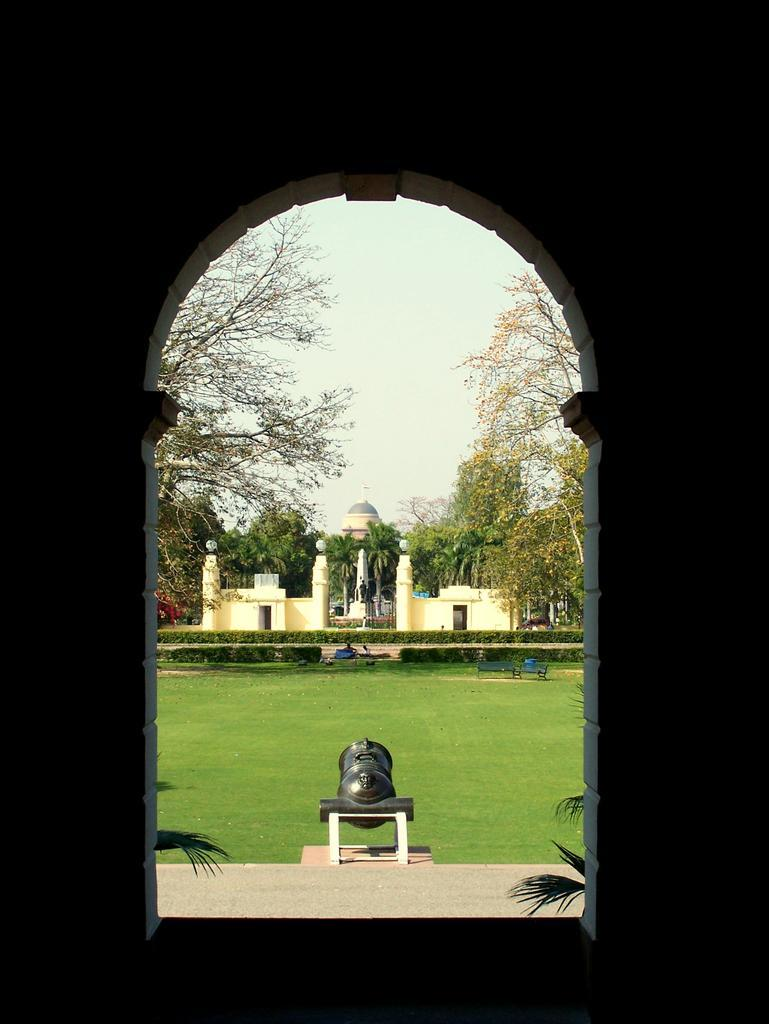
View of Rashtrapati Bhawan from the entrance porch of Teen Murti Bhawan.

Nehru Memorial Museum and Library (NMML) is housed within the Teen Murti Bhavan complex, the complex is named after three statues (Teen Murti in Hindi) established by sculptor Leonard Jennings of Britain in 1922 in honor of the three Indian princely states Jodhpur, Hyderabad and Mysore after their contribution in World War I by serving in the present day Gaza Strip, Israel, and Palestine. It was designed by Robert Tor Russell who also designed Connaught Place and a few parts of Janpath. Spread over 12 hectares, its construction started in 1929 and took around one year for completion. It is a masterpiece of British and French architecture and woodwork. Initially known as Flagstaff House, it was used by British forces as the residence of the Commander-in-Chief.

After independence, the house was taken over as the residence of Jawaharlal Nehru (1889–1964), the first prime minister of India. After his death in 1964, it was decided that the Teen Murti Bhawan should be converted into a museum and a library which would promote original research in modern Indian history with special reference to the Nehruvian era. It was inaugurated on his birth anniversary, 14 November that year, by then President Sarvepalli Radhakrishnan. Nehru Memorial Museum and Library Society was formed on 1 April 1966. The museum was set up in the eastern wing and the library in the western wing of the sprawling building, now called Building I, and retained its colonial architecture while it was being adapted into the Nehru Museum. Bal Ram Nanda was its founder-director, who also curated the museum and library for the next 17 years and received the Padma Vibhushan in 2003.

With the passage of time and the rapid growth of research material in the library, more space was required and an exclusive library building was constructed. It was formally inaugurated by President V. V. Giri in January 1974. However, the steady increase in the volume of material required for research further necessitated the construction of an Annex Building which was completed in 1989. The Centre for Contemporary Studies was set up as an advanced studies unit of NMML in 1990 in the Annex Building. NMML took over the charge of the Nehru Planetarium from the Jawaharlal Nehru Memorial Fund in 2005.

To commemorate the Foundation Day of the Nehru Memorial Museum and Library, it organizes an annual lecture on 1 April, called the Jawaharlal Nehru Memorial Foundation Day Lecture. Nehru Memorial Museum and Library has over the years, supported scholars and historians across India. Through its fellowship program, the Nehru Memorial Fellowship, it has funded some of India's best academics, such as Chief Information Commissioner O. P. Kejriwal.

In 2009, several well-known academics, such as Ramachandra Guha, Sumit Sarkar, Nivedita Menon, Nayanjot Lahiri, Mushirul Hasan, Mukul Kesavan, Mahesh Rangarajan, and Krishna Kumar, alleged that the institution was being run in an inefficient and corrupt fashion. They pointed out that NMML had discontinued its publication program and that the acquisition of manuscripts and oral histories had all but come to a halt. In turn, writer and activist Madhu Kishwar, environmentalist Pradip Krishen, and historians Irfan Habib and D. N. Jha came out in support of NMML and its director, Mridula Mukherjee.

On 26 April 2016, a dagger gifted to prime minister Nehru by Saudi Arabia was stolen from the Nehru Memorial Museum.

In 2023, prime minister Narendra Modi called for an inclusive national memorial to all Indian prime ministers, regardless of their political background. The Ministry of Culture, in collaboration with the renamed Prime Ministers’ Museum and Library Society, expanded the NMML into the Pradhanmantri Sangrahalaya. The newly built Building II, was designed by Sikka Associates Architects. The design represents hands of different prime ministers' shaping a rising nation, with elements symbolizing collective progress and development. Building II incorporates eco-friendly features such as solar panels, rainwater harvesting systems, and landscaped green zones, and is planned with clean lines, open atria, and panoramic glazing to symbolize transparency in governance. Both buildings are linked via landscaped pathways, for a visitor experience between the heritage and modern sections. The entire project spans around 15,600m² and houses 43 distinct galleries. The planning process prioritized minimal disruption to the heritage estate, with much of the new construction placed on previously disturbed ground to protect green spaces.

The renaming of the library and museum invited significant criticism from the Indian National Congress.

== Museum ==
The new Pradhanmantri Sangrahalaya or Prime Ministers' Museum (formerly Nehru Memorial Museum) was officially inaugurated on 14 April 2022 by prime minister Narendra Modi. Through the integration of immersive technology, curated archival material, and interactive storytelling, the museum offers visitors a panoramic narrative of India's democratic history and socio-economic transformation under successive governments. The museum is designed as both a commemorative and educational space, aiming to inspire civic awareness among citizens, particularly younger generations, by showcasing how leaders from diverse socio-economic, cultural, and regional backgrounds rose to the nation's highest executive office. Each leader's tenure is presented in the context of the historical challenges, policy and leadership decisions, and developmental milestones of their era, narrating how they navigated wars, economic reforms, global diplomacy, natural disasters, and technological revolutions; providing a nuanced understanding of India's governance and political evolution in the context of the country's evolving socio-political landscape. The institution also serves as a repository for prime ministerial archives, ensuring that important historical materials are preserved for research and education. The museum blends historicity with modern presentation techniques, featuring rare photographs, personal artefacts, official documents, speeches, and multimedia installations that bring to life key moments in India's post-independence history.

The museum also has special references for children, considered to be close to Jawaharlal Nehru, who is also known by the nickname "Chacha Nehru" (lit. 'Uncle Nehru').

From April 2015 to March 2016, the museum received nearly 1.7 million visitors.

=== Exhibits ===
The museum leverages cutting-edge presentation tools for showcasing interactive historical narratives. Key technologies include:

- Holographic displays of speeches and events from various prime ministerial tenures.
- Augmented and Virtual Reality (AR/VR) experiences simulating historic moments such as cabinet meetings or foreign visits.
- Projection mapping to recreate pivotal events on large-scale immersive screens.
- 360° immersive theatre for a "Time Machine" experience tracing India's democratic path.
- Motion-synchronized helicopter-ride simulation over development projects.
- Interactive touchscreens offering archival photographs, audio clips, and videos.
- Animatronics for lifelike representations of historic personalities.
- Handheld audio guides are available in multiple languages, with content tailored for different age groups.

== Library ==
The Prime Ministers' Library (formerly Nehru Memorial Library) is the world's leading resource center on India's first prime minister Jawaharlal Nehru. Its archives contain the bulk of Mahatma Gandhi's writings, as well as private papers of Swami Sahajanand Saraswati, C. Rajagopalachari, B. C. Roy, Jayaprakash Narayan, Charan Singh, Sarojini Naidu and Rajkumari Amrit Kaur. Amongst noted publications of the NMML are Selected Works of Jawaharlal Nehru, Man of Destiny by Ruskin Bond, and Nehru Anthology (1980). The library also has an archive of the private correspondence between Nehru and Edwina Mountbatten, wife of Lord Mountbatten, but with limited access.

It is also a library in Delhi for social sciences as it has a collection on labour related issues in the form of PhD dissertations, reports, books, journals and newspapers.

=== Digital library ===
In March 2010, it launched a digitization project of its archives. The collection of manuscripts, historical documents and other archival materials of the Nehru Memorial Museum and Library were made available online, after the digitization project, with the help of HCL Infosystems in 2010. By May 2011, employing the Ministry of Culture's funding of ₹10 crore, the project had digitized 50 collections of manuscripts (867,000 pages of manuscripts) and 834 interview transcripts and over one lakh images of the newspaper Amrita Bazar Patrika (1905–1938), uploaded 500,000 pages and scanned 29,807 photographs for the digital library website. In all, the digitization covered nine million documents by 2015.
