= Jan Smit (physicist) =

Dutch physicist (born 1943)

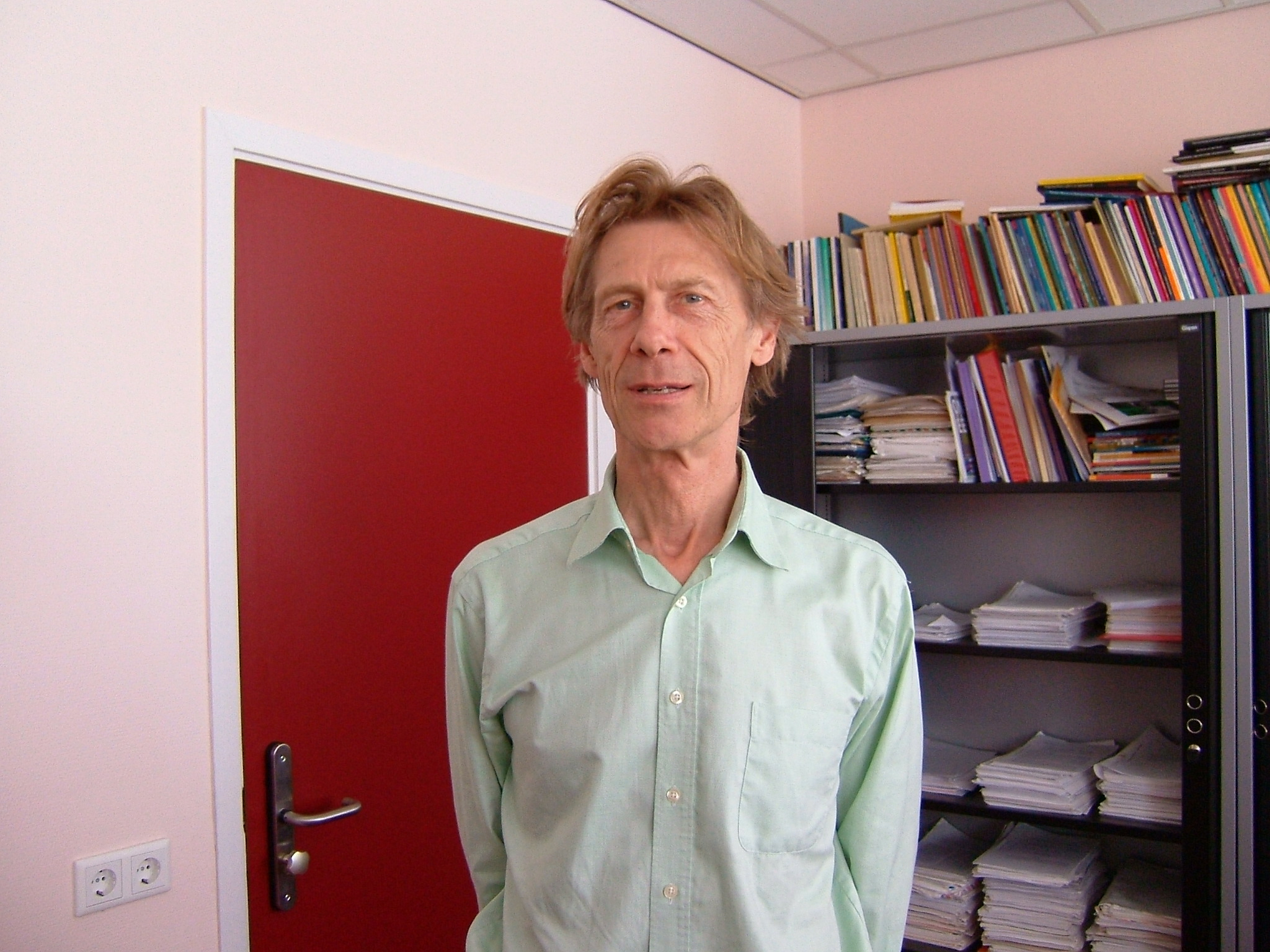
Jan Smit at the University of Amsterdam

Jan Smit (born 16 September 1943, Amsterdam) is a Dutch theoretical physicist.

During his PhD at UCLA with professor Robert Finkelstein he made some early contributions to lattice formulation of quantum field theory around 1972, which was a year before Kenneth Wilson, and two years before Alexander Polyakov. However, he encountered some problems with fermion doubling which he could not solve at the moment. At that time he did not realize the value of his work and he only mentioned it briefly in his Ph.D. thesis in 1974, which was about Schwinger source theory. A few years later he returned to working on the lattice formulation and became a well-known expert in the field.

He works at the University of Amsterdam at the Institute of Theoretical Physics.
