= John Michael Cornwall =

American theoretical physicist

John Michael Cornwall (born 19 August 1934 in Denver, Colorado) is an American theoretical physicist who does research on elementary particle physics and quantum field theory as well as geophysics and physics of near-space. He is known for the Pinch Technique.

Cornwall graduated from Harvard University with a bachelor's degree in 1956 and from the University of Denver with a master's degree in 1959. He graduated in 1962 from the University of California, Berkeley with a doctorate under the supervision of Malvin Ruderman. Cornwall was a postdoctoral fellow at the California Institute of Technology (Caltech) and from 1963 to 1965 at the Institute for Advanced Study. At the University of California, Los Angeles (UCLA) he became in 1965 an assistant professor and in 1974 a full professor.

Cornwall invented the Pinch Technique for calculating gauge-invariant off-shell Green's functions for QCD and other Yang-Mills theories, showing how a dynamical gauge-invariant mass arises for QCD gluons and how such gluons, with the long-range pure-gauge fields that necessarily accompany gauge-invariant mass generation, lead to confinement and other non-perturbative phenomena. He has also written some 40 papers on space plasmas such as the aurora, the ionosphere, and the magnetospheric ring current, leading among other things to a detailed understanding of the dynamical role of electromagnetic cyclotron instabilities in the magnetosphere.

Cornwall published with Richard E. Norton in 1973 one of the earliest papers on dynamic symmetry breaking in Yang-Mills theories. In the later part of his career he has worked on non-perturbative quantum chromodynamics.

He was an advisor to the Space Sciences Laboratory of the Aerospace Corporation in El Segundo (1962–1993) and to the Institute for Defense Analyses in Alexandria (2002–2015), as well as to the National Aeronautics and Space Administration (NASA). He was a faculty member of the Pardee RAND Graduate School of Public Policy (1999–2005) and a member of the Defense Science Board (1992–1994). For some years he has been a member and now chairman of an advisory board at Livermore National Laboratory (1989–present), and is a long-term member of the JASON Advisory Group.

He was from 1967 to 1969 a Sloan Fellow and from 1968 to 1969 a visiting scientist at the Niels Bohr Institute in Copenhagen. He was a visiting professor for the academic year 1987–1988 at the Massachusetts Institute of Technology and in 1989 at Rockefeller University.

He is a Fellow of the American Physical Society (2005), the New York Academy of Sciences, the American Geophysical Union, and the American Association for the Advancement of Science.

== Selected publications ==
- with Joannis Papavassiliou, Daniele Binosi: The pinch technique and applications to non-abelian gauge theories, Cambridge University Press 2011
- with Richard E. Norton: On the formalism of relativistic many body theory, Annals of Physics, Vol. 91, 1975, p. 106 doi:10.1016/0003-4916(75)90281-X
- with Roman Jackiw, E. Tomboulis: "Effective action for composite operators", Physical Review D, vol. 10, 1974, pp. 2428-2445 doi:10.1103/PhysRevD.10.2428
- with G. Tiktopoulos: On-shell asymptotics of non-abelian gauge fields, Phys. Rev. Lett., vol. 35, 1975, p. 338 doi:10.1103/PhysRevLett.35.338
- with G. Tiktopoulos: Infrared Behavior of non-abelian gauge theories, Phys. Rev. D, vol. 13, 1976, pp. 3370-3397 doi:10.1103/PhysRevD.13.3370; part 2, Phys. Rev. D, Vol. 15, 1977, 2397 doi:10.1103/PhysRevD.15.2937
- Dynamical mass generation in continuum quantum chromodynamics, Phys. Rev. D, Vol. 26, 1982, p. 1453 doi:10.1103/PhysRevD.26.1453
- Ein Zufluchtsort für den Wahnsinn. In: Will Hall, Jenseits der Psychiatrie – Stimmen und Visionen des Wahnsinns im Madness Radio. Berlin & Lancaster: Peter Lehmann Publishing 2023, pp. 158-162. ISBN 978-3-910546-23-3, ISBN 978-3-910546-26-4
