= Death and state funeral of Jawaharlal Nehru =

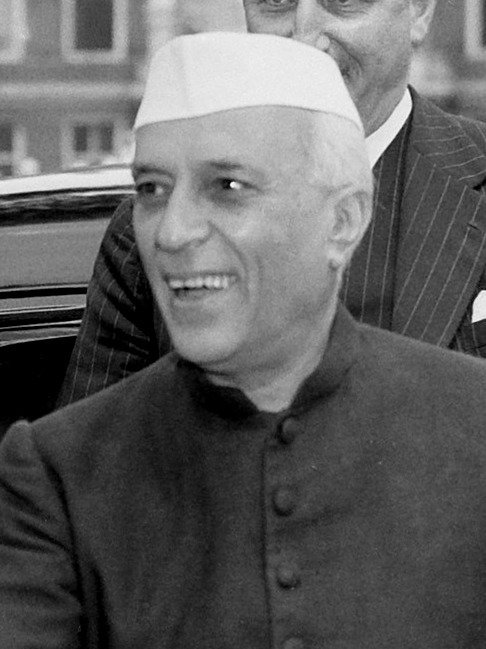
Jawaharlal Nehru, the first Prime Minister of India, in 1957

Pandit Jawaharlal Nehru, the first Prime Minister of India, died in the afternoon of 27 May 1964, at the age of 74, of a heart attack.

== Death ==
Nehru had been in declining health for some time. He suffered a serious stroke in early 1964. From 23 to 26 May, he went to Dehradun for a short rest, returning to his official residence at Teen Murti Bhawan in New Delhi. He woke early the next morning and after complaining of a pain in his back, suffered a stroke at 6:25 and fell unconscious and without having regained consciousness he died at 13:44.

== Aftermath ==
During the evening of 27 May, Indian Army engineers prepared a cremation ground, levelling a plot of land situated near the Yamuna River about 300 yards north of the Raj Ghat and constructing a link road from the main road leading to the area. From 18:00 that evening until the following morning, flag officers representing the Indian Armed Forces maintained a constant vigil by the body of Nehru while it lay in state, rotating every hour. The officers were:

- Major General Amrik Singh (Military Secretary, Indian Army)
- Major General R. N. Nehra (Deputy Quartermaster-General, Indian Army)
- Major General D. B. Chopra (Chairman, Joint Planning Commission, Indian Army)
- Major General S. P. Vohra (Director of Corps of Electrical and Mechanical Engineers, Indian Army)
- Major General S. N. Mubayi (Director of Ordnance, Indian Army)
- Air Vice-Marshal Ramaswamy Rajaram (Deputy Chief of Air Staff, Indian Air Force)
- Air Vice-Marshal H. N. Chatterjee (Air Officer-in-Charge Maintenance Command, Indian Air Force)
- Air Vice-Marshal B. V. Malse
- Commodore Douglas St. John Cameron (Chief of Personnel, Indian Navy)

== Funeral ==
Nehru was accorded a state funeral with full military honours. The three chief pall bearers were the chiefs of each branch of the Indian Armed Forces: General Jayanto Nath Chaudhuri (Indian Army), Vice Admiral Bhaskar Sadashiv Soman (Indian Navy) and Air Marshal Aspy Engineer (Indian Air Force).

On the morning of 28 May, Nehru's body, draped with the national flag, was placed on a ceremonial gun carriage by six pallbearers representing the Indian Armed Forces, with two officers from each armed force. The six officers were:

- Lieutenant General A. C. Iyappa
- Lieutenant General M. S. Pathania
- Rear Admiral B. N. Lele
- Air Vice-Marshal S. N. Goyal
- Air Vice-Marshal B. V. Male
- Commodore Sourendra Nath Kohli

The army officers were placed at the front of the bier to place Nehru's body onto the gun carriage, which was then drawn through the streets of Delhi by three groups of servicemen, one from each armed service.

Despite it being contrary to his express wishes, Nehru was cremated by Hindu rites. The cremation took place at Shantivan. The samadhi in the form of a large base covered with a lawn is located north of Raj Ghat, the Samadhi of Mahatma Gandhi on the banks of the Yamuna, witnessed by 1.5 million mourners who had flocked into the streets of Delhi and the cremation grounds. At the cremation ground, seven senior military officers (Major Generals D. B. Chopra, S. P. Vohra and R. N. Batra from the army, Captains K. K. Sanjana and V. A. Kamath from the navy and Air Commodores Hari Chand Dewan and Hrushikesh Moolgavkar from the air force) lifted the bier bearing Nehru's body from the gun carriage and onto their shoulders. The bearers carried the bier inside the cremation ground, placed Nehru's body on the funeral pyre and saluted the bier before moving away. The six pallbearers then removed the pall from Nehru's body before the pyre was lit.

=== Dignitaries ===
The following dignitaries attended Nehru's state funeral:

Country	Dignitary
Algeria	Personal Representative of the President Lakhdar Brahimi
Ceylon	Prime Minister Sirimavo Bandaranaike
France	Personal Representative of the President, Minister of Administrative Reforms Louis Joxe
Ghana	Minister of Justice Kofi Asante Ofori-Atta
Iran	Minister of Interior Javad Sadr
Japan	Minister of Foreign Affairs Masayoshi Ōhira
South Korea	Minister of Foreign Affairs Tong-wŏn Yi
Morocco	Representative to the King Ahmed Balafrej
Nepal	Chairman of the Council of Ministers Tulsi Giri
Nigeria	Minister for Foreign Affairs and Commonwealth Relations Jaja Wachuku
Pakistan	Minister of Foreign Affairs Zulfikar Ali Bhutto
Romania	First Deputy Prime Minister Gheorghe Apostol; Deputy Minister of Foreign Affairs Eduard Mezincescu; Ambassador to India Aurel Ardeleanu
Soviet Union	First Deputy Premier Alexei Kosygin
Tunisia	President Habib Bourguiba; Minister of Foreign Affairs Mongi Slim
Uganda	Minister of Works and Communications Lawrence Kalule-Settala
United Arab Republic	Vice President Hussein el-Shafei
United Kingdom	Prime Minister Alec Douglas-Home; Deputy Leader of the Labour Party George Brown; Chief of the Defence Staff, last Viceroy and Governor-General of India Louis Mountbatten
United States	Secretary of State Dean Rusk; Ambassador to India Chester B. Bowles; Assistant Secretary of State for Near Eastern and South Asian Affairs Phillips Talbot
Yugoslavia	Prime Minister Petar Stambolić

== Dispersal of ashes ==
In his will, composed on 21 June 1954 and released to the public on 3 June 1964, Nehru had requested his body be cremated and his ashes scattered across India:

"I am proud of that great inheritance that has been and is ours, and I am conscious that I too, like all of us, am a link in that unbroken chain which goes back to the dawn of history in the immemorial past of India. That chain I would not break, for I treasure it and seek inspiration from it. And as witness of this desire of mine and as my last homage to India's cultural inheritance, I am making this request that a handful of my ashes be thrown into the Ganga at Allahabad to be carried to the great ocean that washes India's shore. The major portion of my ashes should, however, be disposed of otherwise. I want these to be carried high up into the air In an aeroplane and scattered from that height over the fields where the peasants of India toil, so that they might mingle with the dust and soil of India and become an indistinguishable part of India."

Accordingly, on 7 June 1964, a portion of Nehru's ashes which had been returned to Teen Murti Bhawan left the residence in a funerary urn on a ceremonial gun carriage, preceded by the three armed service chiefs in a car. The ashes were then conveyed by a special train from New Delhi to Allahabad, where they were taken in a motorcade to Anand Bhawan, the Nehru family home, for one hour. They were then escorted by motorcade through Allahabad to the Sangam Ghat. At the ghat, the ashes were transferred to a white-painted amphibious DUKW which took the ashes to a spot in the Ganges, accompanied by two other DUKW craft carrying dignitaries, telecommunications personnel and an Indian Army brass band. The band played the hymn "Abide with Me" a moment before the urn and the ashes were immersed in the Ganges, a gun at Allahabad Fort firing a salute at the exact moment of the immersion. Two other portions of ashes were taken by government officials to the Nicobar Islands and to Port Blair; those ashes were immersed in the ocean on 8 June.

Between 8:00 and 12:00 on 12 June, the major portion of the ashes were simultaneously scattered by IAF aircraft at 20 previously designated locations around the country.

== National mournings ==
Gamal Abdel Nasser declared 7 days of mourning in Egypt and the flags were flown at half-mast during the period. Syria declared national mourning. Iraq declared 3 days of mourning. Yugoslavia declared 2 days of national mourning and cancelled all sports and entertainment events for 2 days. Ceylon (now Sri Lanka) declared 2 days of mourning. Nepal declared 3 days of national mourning. Cambodia declared a national mourning of 3 days. Pakistan flew the flag at half-mast on May 28 in all public buildings to mourn the death of Nehru. India itself declared 12 days of national mourning. Kuwait declared national mourning for 3 days. Bhutan declared mourning of 49 days. Kingdom of Sikkim, Malaysia and Uganda declared 1 day of national mourning.

== Reactions ==
=== Africa ===
Ghana - President Kwame Nkrumah expressed his "sense of personal loss in the death of Nehru," and that he was sure these feelings were "shared by you all in Ghana as well as millions in other parts of Africa and Asia. Rarely have the qualities of wisdom, courage, humanity and great learning found such perfect fusion and expression in one individual as they did in Shri Nehru. Soft in speech, but forthright in expression, his voice was heard in the counsels of the world in defence of freedom and dignity of man." Nkrumah added Nehru's "sympathy and understanding of the problems of Africa were a great source of courage to all who have been engaged in [the] struggle for [the] liberation and unity of Africa."

Kenya - President Jomo Kenyatta said: "Not only India but the whole world has been deprived of an outstanding leader in the path of peace and freedom for all men. The passing of this great patriot has cast a shadow of grief over the whole world. His monument will stand for ever in the eyes of the world, a free and independent India set by his efforts on the road to prosperity and pride of place among the great nations of the world."

Sudan - President Ibrahim Abboud of the Republic of the Sudan said, "Your country, your people and, indeed the whole world will miss this truly great leader and statesman who was a man of extreme courage, an ardent advocate of peace and a great champion of human liberty."

Tunisia - President Habib Bourgiba said "our great friend and old comrade in the struggle for liberation. His death is felt by all mankind as a great loss which reached indeed far beyond the boundaries of the Indian Republic."

=== Americas ===
Canada - Governor General Georges Vanier said: "Nehru was a great man and a great statesman leading his country through some of the most crucial days of India's history . He was a leader known throughout the world for his courage and dedication to the welfare of his people. His loss will be sorely felt by all mankind."

United States - US President Lyndon B. Johnson remarked: "History has already recorded his monumental contribution to the molding of a strong and independent India. And yet, it is not just as a leader of India that he has served humanity. Perhaps more than any other world leader he has given expression to man's yearning for peace. This is the issue of our age. In his fearless pursuit of a world free from war he has served all humanity."

=== Asia ===
Cyprus - Vice-President Fazıl Küçük said, "Pandit Nehru's death is certainly an irreparable loss, not only for India but for the whole world. The ideals for which this great man fought and the achievements he has brought about during his lifetime will be an ever burning torch diffusing rays of inspiration and wisdom to all the peoples of the world.

China - Premier of the People's Republic of China Zhou Enlai said, "Grieved to learn of the unfortunate death of His Excellency Jawaharlal Nehru, prime minister of India, I wish to express to your excellency and the Indian Government deep condolences on behalf of the Chinese Government and in my own name. There is a profound traditional friendship between the peoples of China and India. Although certain differences still exist now between our two countries, yet this unfortunate situation cannot but be temporary. I am convinced that the friendly relations between the Chinese and Indian peoples will certainly be restored and developed on the basis of the Five Principles of peaceful coexistence."

Indonesia - President Sukarno said, "The Indonesian Government and people and myself offer sincere condolences on the death of my dear friend, Pandit Jawaharlal Nehru. As the leader of the Indian people his name is well-known throughout Indonesia because of the part he played in the struggle for Indonesia's independence. People the world over mourn his death because they will miss his further contribution to the struggle for the establishment of a better world. We have the full confidence that the Indian people will continue to develop his leadership."

Iran - Iranian monarch Mohammad Reza Pahlavi said, "With his demise not only has India suffered the irreparable loss of a dedicated, brilliant and courageous leader, but the world has been deprived of the wisdom of a man of faith and peace." He further added, "The death of Mr. Nehru has deprived the world of an upright and liberal man."

North Yemen - President Abdullah al-Sallal said, "The people and Government of Yemen dip their flag with all peace-loving nations of the world over the passing away of the greatest fighter for peace. We are deeply shocked and share the sorrow of all citizens of India and of all those who believed all over the world in the freedom of peoples and in world peace.

Soviet Union: Soviet Premier Nikita Khrushchev and the future Soviet Premier Leonid Brezhnev remarked: "The name of Jawaharal Nehru enjoyed the tremendous respect and love of the Soviet people, who knew him as a tested and wise leader of the Indian people's struggle for national independence and the rebirth of their country, and as an active fighter against colonialism. Jawaharal Nehru is known as an outstanding statesman of modern times who devoted his entire life to the struggle for strengthening friendship and cooperation among peoples and for the progress of humanity. He was a passionate fighter for peace in the world and an ardent champion of principles of peaceful coexistence of states. He was the inspirer of the nonalignment policy promoted by the Indian Government. This reasonable policy won India respect and, due to it, India is now occupying a worthy place in the international arena."

Pakistan: Pakistan had announced 1 day mourning.

- President Ayub Khan said, "The untimely demise of Mr. Nehru is the loss of a great Indian leader who commanded not only admiration but also the devotion of his people. It is an irreparable loss to India and I wish to convey to you and through you to the Government and people of India our sincere sympathy in their bereavement."
- The West Pakistan Provincial Assembly offered "heartfelt and sincere sympathy to the Government and People of India on their great loss in the sad demise of Pandit Jawaharlal Nehru. The Assembly adjourned without transacting business after observing two minutes' silence in memory of the "great fighter for freedom."

Saudi Arabia - Prince Faisal sent condolences to the President of India, Sarvepalli Radhakrishnan and Nehru's daughter Indira Gandhi.

South Arabia:

- State of Aden - Chief Minister Zain Baharoon said, "It made me very sad to hear of the death of Mr. Nehru...This is certainly a great loss of a great man who has made himself, his people and the cause of all Orientals felt and known in the whole world."

Turkey - President Cemal Gursel said, "I wish to convey on behalf of the people of Turkey and on my own behalf our deep sympathies and sincere condolences to Your Excellency [the President of India] as well as to the Indian nation for this irreplaceable loss."

=== Europe ===
Eastern Europe and Warsaw Pact

East Germany - Chairman of the GDR State Council Walter Ulbricht said, "On behalf of the population of the German Democratic Republic and the State Council of the German Democratic Republic and in my name permit me...to convey my deep felt condolence and beg that our feelings be made known to the relatives of the departed and to the population of the Republic of India. The population of the German Democratic Republic shares the sorrow of the Indian people and the whole of peace-loving humanity at the demise of the eminent statesman who tirelessly fought for the preservation of peace and who also clearly advocated a peaceful solution to questions concerning Germany. The State Council and the population of the German Democratic Republic will hold the memory of the great son of the Indian people in permanent honour." Premier Otto Grotewohl and Foreign Minister Lothar Bolz also conveyed their condolences.

SFR Yugoslavia

- President Josip Broz Tito said, "The news of the sudden death of the great leader of the Indian people, Mr. Jawaharlal Nehru, has deeply distressed all over. In his death, the Indian people suffered a great loss because he leaves the scene of internal and international development right at a time when his contribution was of great significance."
- Prime Minister Petar Stambolic said, "He was not only a great Indian but an outstanding figure in the modern world and for world peace. It is a great loss for peace and progress in the world."

Western Europe

France - President Charles de Gaulle said, "It was with great emotion that I learned of the death of Pandit Jawaharlal Nehru, a statesman whose eminent qualities placed at the service of democratic, social progress and peace profoundly marked the destiny of India and coosequently that of the world."

Sweden - Prime Minister Tage Erlander said, "I am deeply touched by the death of Jawaharlal Nehru. His life and work were of the greatest importance not only for India but also for the entire world. His death is a great loss to us all."

United Kingdom:

- Queen Elizabeth II said, "I am deeply grieved to hear of the death of Mr. Nehru, who will be mourned throughout the Commonwealth and among the peace-loving peoples of the world. My husband and my family join me in sending our deep and sincere sympathy to you [the President of India] and to the people of India in the irreparable loss which you have suffered."
- Prime Minister Alec Douglas-Home said, "My colleagues and I are deeply distressed to learn of Mr. Nehru's death. We mourn the death of the architect of modern India, a wise and far-sighted world statesman, and above all an eminent and respected Commonwealth leader. His death will be a grievous loss to the Commonwealth and to the world. We send our heartfelt sympathy and condolences to the Government of India on their great loss."
- Former Prime Minister Clement Attlee, Prime Minister at the time of Indian independence, said Nehru "was a great world figure and perhaps might be regarded as a doyen of world statesmen." Observing Nehru as a man "singularly free of bitterness," Attlee added Nehru had been put in prison by British Governments for many years yet he never showed any bitterness but with "wise statesmanship did all he could to promote friendship between the two peoples. I, of course, knew him well and valued his friendship".
- Chairman of the Labour Party Anthony Greenwood said, "Mr. Nehru was an outstanding power in working for peace and the world is much poorer for his loss. Our thoughts go out to the Indian people at this tragic moment." He added that he had known Nehru "for more than 30 years" and that his death was "a great loss"

West Germany - President Heinrich Luebke said, "With the death of Mr. Jawaharlal Nehru, India and the whole of mankind have lost an eminent statesman who was held in high esteem throughout the world as a leader in the struggle for peace and international understanding. His sincere personality and the ideals he stood for will never be forgotten in Germany.

=== Oceania ===
Australia - Prime Minister Robert Menzies said, "This is a significant date in history. It marks the end of the life of one of the most remarkable men of our time. Mr. Nehru was the maker of modern India. He had survived with a singular balance of mind both hardships and successes. He occupied a place in the hearts and hopes of his hundreds of millions of people which it will not be easy for any successor to attain. His great gifts and his unceasing and positive interest in world affairs gave him a notable standing in world negotiations and conferences. When the Commonwealth Prime Ministers meet in London in July it will be difficult to realise that he has gone and that we shall see and hear him no more."

== See also ==
- List of things named after Jawaharlal Nehru
