= Gary Steigman =

American astrophysicist and astronomer

Gary Steigman (February 23, 1941, New York City – April 9, 2017, Columbus, Ohio) was an American astrophysicist and astronomer, known for his research on primordial nucleosynthesis, particle physics in the first few minutes of the Big Bang, and relic particle abundance.

After graduating in 1961 with a bachelor's degree in physics from the City College of New York, he received in 1968 his PhD, under the supervision of Malvin Ruderman, from New York University. Steigman's doctoral dissertation showed that the hypothesis of cosmological matter–antimatter symmetry is false and in our universe there be must be a significant excess of baryons over antibaryons. This work was published in 1969 in the journal Nature and was followed in 1976 with a highly cited article in the Annual Review of Astronomy and Astrophysics. He became in 1968 a visiting fellow at the University of Cambridge's Institute of Theoretical Astronomy (now the Institute of Astronomy) and in 1970 a research fellow at Caltech.

Beginning in 1972 he spent 23 summers at the Aspen Center for Physics, where he served as a trustee in 1978–83, a member of the advisory board in 1983–98, and a longtime organizer of astrophysics workshops.

Steigman became in 1972 a faculty member at Yale University, in 1978 a member of the Bartol Research Institute at the University of Delaware, and in 1986 a full professor at Ohio State University, where he retired in 2012 as professor emeritus. He was elected a fellow of the American Physical Society in 1991.

In 1977 Steigman, with James E. Gunn and David N. Schramm, published a paper that, using facts about ^{4}He abundances and primordial nucleosynthesis, established a new limit on the number of neutrino species; their results showed that "the total number of types of heavy leptons must be less than or equal to 5." This demonstration was one of the first to constrain particle physics by means of facts about cosmology.

Steigman and Schramm received first prize in the 1980 Gravity Research Foundation essay competition for their paper which analyzed a hypothetical universe dominated by massive neutrinos. Their essay was among the earliest proposals for a universe dominated by non-baryonic particles. With David Schramm, Michael Turner, Keith Olive, and Terrence P. Walker, Gary Steigman derived accurate estimates of the baryon density of the universe and constrained particle properties. In the 1980s and 1990s they wrote a series of highly cited papers predicting a precise value for the baryon density of the universe. Their prediction was confirmed by CMB measurements.

In 1984 Steigman, with Michael Turner and Lawrence Krauss, suggested that many problems in cosmology could be solved by re-introducing the idea of a nonzero cosmological constant.

He was recruited to Ohio State in 1986 to found a cosmology center, which would include both astronomers and physicists. Around the same time, he began a romantic, interhemispheric relationship with a Brazilian astronomer, Sueli Viegas, from the Institute of Astronomy, Geophysics and Atmospheric Sciences at the University of São Paulo, whom he had met at a conference in Rio de Janeiro. They married in 2004, after Dr. Viegas had retired from São Paulo. Besides Dr. Viegas, Dr. Steigman is survived by a stepdaughter, Cibele Aldrovandi; a stepson, Leonardo Aldrovandi; and two nieces: Jill Bayor and Robin Coe. A previous marriage had ended in divorce.
