= Malvin Ruderman =

American physicist (1927–2024)

Malvin A. Ruderman
- Born: March 25, 1927; New York, New York, U.S.
- Died: July 20, 2024 (aged 97); New York, New York, U.S.
- Citizenship: U.S.
- Education: Columbia University (BA); California Institute of Technology (MS, PhD)
- Known for: RKKY interaction
- Spouse: Paula Ruderman
- Children: 3
- Awards: Guggenheim Fellowship (1956)
- Scientific career
- Fields: Physics, Astrophysics
- Workplaces: UC Berkeley; New York University; Columbia University
- Thesis: "Electron Decay of the Pion" (1951)
- Doctoral advisor: Robert Jay Finkelstein
- Doctoral students: John Michael Cornwall, Gary Steigman, Alak Ray

Malvin Avram Ruderman (March 25, 1927 – July 20, 2024) was an American physicist and astrophysicist.

== Education ==
Mal Ruderman received his A.B. degree from Columbia University in 1945. His MS degree (1947) and PhD (1951) are from the California Institute of Technology under the supervision of Robert Jay Finkelstein.

== Career ==
In 1951–53, Ruderman worked at Berkeley's Radiation Laboratory. He became an assistant professor at UC Berkeley in 1953, rising by 1964 to the rank of full professor. He moved to New York University in 1964, and to Columbia University in 1969, becoming Centennial Professor in 1980. Ruderman served as chair of the Department of Physics at Columbia in 1973–75.

With Charles Kittel in 1954, Ruderman discovered the RKKY interaction for nuclear magnetic moments in certain metals (independently developed by Kasuya and Yosida, hence its name). His later research interests in astrophysics include collapsed objects in astrophysics, neutron stars, and gamma ray emission.

In the early 1960s, Ruderman was a member of the committee that conceived the Berkeley Physics Course. He developed the first draft of the first volume, Mechanics, for use at Berkeley in 1963. With Charles Kittel and Walter D. Knight, he was co-author of the final published volume.

In 1969, Ruderman and (independently) Gordon Baym, Christopher Pethick, and David Pines, were the first to propose that discontinuous slowings observed in neutron stars, so called starquakes, were due to the cracking of the star's solid crust, under increasing stress due to the gradual slowdown of the pulsar. Ruderman died on July 20, 2024, at the age of 97.

== Honors ==
Ruderman was awarded a Guggenheim Fellowship in 1956. He was elected to the National Academy of Sciences in 1972, the American Academy of Arts and Sciences in 1974, and the American Philosophical Society in 1996. He is a recipient of the Pregel Medal of the New York Academy of Sciences.
