= Robert Finkelstein =

American theoretical physicist (1916–2020)

Robert Jay Finkelstein (March 26, 1916 – August 27, 2020) was an American theoretical physicist, specializing in elementary particle physics.

Finkelstein was born in Pittsfield, Massachusetts in March 1916. After graduation from Pittsfield High School, he matriculated in 1933 at Dartmouth College, graduating there as salutatorian in the class of 1937. He received his Ph.D. in 1941 from Harvard University with dissertation The Energy Levels of Chrome Alum. II. Magnetic Susceptibility of Cerium Ethylsulfate under the supervision of John Hasbrouck Van Vleck. After completing his last doctoral examination, he went to Washington, DC to join Francis Bitter’s research group in the Navy Department. Finkelstein worked briefly with an operational research group that included Marshall Stone and Joseph Doob but then transferred to a research group working on shockwaves and detonation theory. He found an analytic solution to a shockwave problem that Subrahmanyan Chandrasekhar had previously solved numerically and also co-authored with George Gamow the paper Theory of the Detonation Process.

Finkelstein recounted his experiences as a member of the group working on shockwaves and detonation theory:

... Einstein had agreed to serve as a consultant to our group but did not want to travel to Washington. So there had to be a liaison person and I was given that opportunity. Since Einstein did not know me, there had to be someone to introduce us. It then happened that I was introduced to Einstein by John von Neumann, one of the most important mathematicians of all time, and who had also become a consultant to our group. It was a very great experience for a new Ph.D. to be introduced to Einstein by Von Neumann! During the following period I met Einstein every week until Gamow joined our group and became the liaison person.

As a postdoc Finkelstein was at the University of Chicago and then spent the academic year 1947–1948 at the Institute for Advanced Study as part of a research group (including H. Lewis, S. Wouthuysen, and L. Foldy) under the leadership of Robert Oppenheimer. In 1948 Finkelstein joined the faculty of UCLA as part of the high energy theory group. Several times he was on sabbatical at the Institute for Advanced Study. He was a Guggenheim Fellow for the academic year 1959–1960. He retired from UCLA in 1986 as professor emeritus.

At UCLA he made important contributions to beta decay theory, predicting the parity of the pi-mesons, and calculating radiative corrections to muon decay. During the same period he discovered the soliton solutions to gauge theories. His later work in non-Abelian gauge theories led to important relations among masses and couplings, as well as the discovery that the Feynman rules have to be modified in those theories. There followed a long series of papers on general relativity and supergravity. More recently he has developed a model for elementary particles based on "q-deformations" of the Lorentz group and knot theory.

Finkelstein married in 1956. His doctoral students include David Hestenes, Malvin Ruderman, and Jan Smit. He died in Los Angeles, California in August 2020 at the age of 104.
