= Teen Murti Bhavan =

Museum complex in New Delhi, Delhi, India

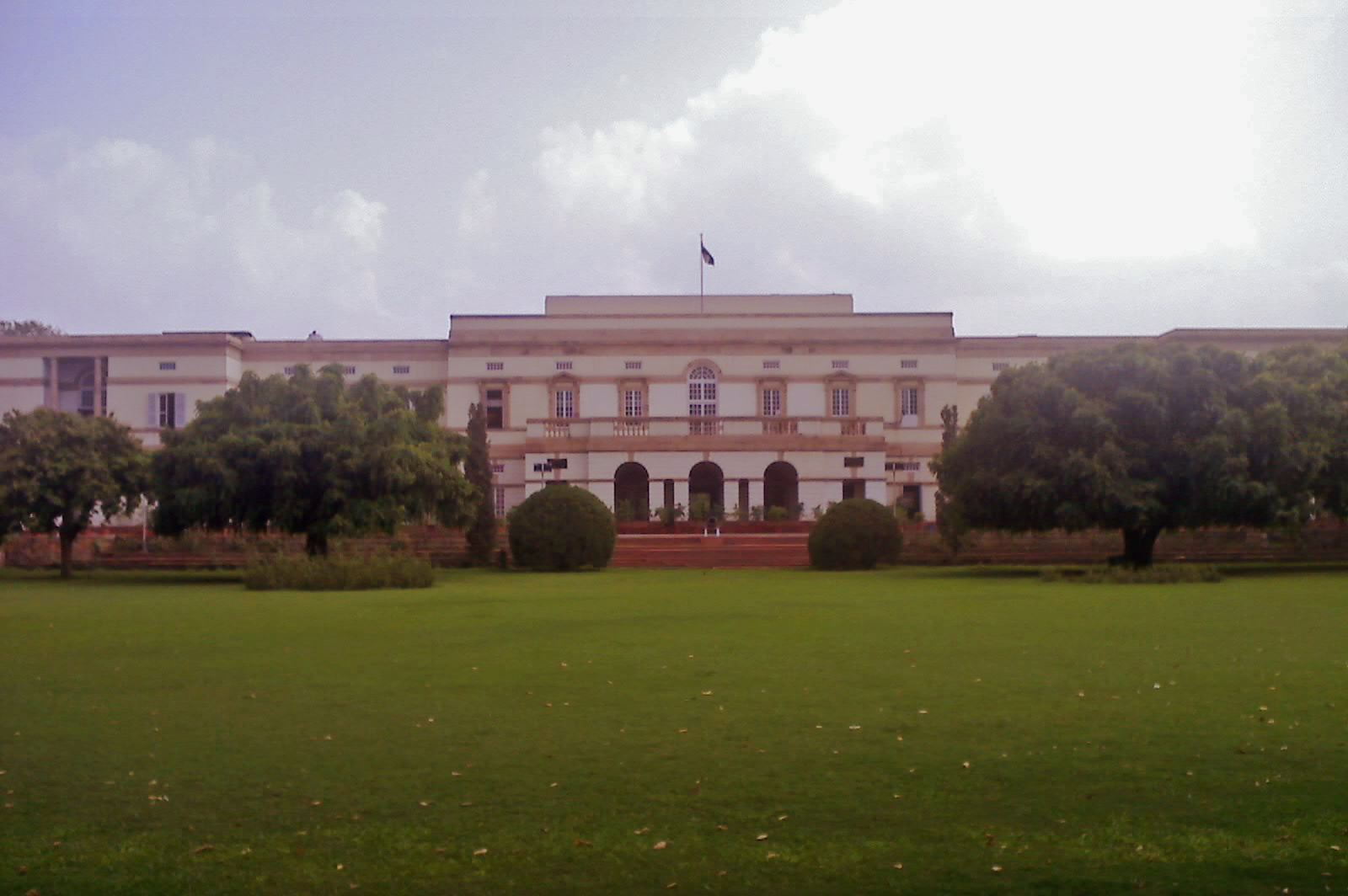
- Residence of India's first Prime minister, Pt. Jawaharlal Nehru
- Interactive map of the Teen Murti Bhavan area
- Former names: Flagstaff House

General information
- Location: Teen Murti Haifa Road, New Delhi, Delhi-110011, India
- Coordinates: 28.602608°N 77.198774°E
- Completed: 1930
- Client: Pradhanmantri Sangrahalaya
- Owner: Government of India

Design and construction
- Architect: Robert Tor Russell
- Known for: Pradhanmantri Sangrahalaya; Prime Ministers' Museum and Library Society; Former Prime Minister's Office; Nehru Planetarium

The Teen Murti Bhavan (Teen Murti House; formerly known as Flagstaff House) is a building and former residence in New Delhi. It was built by the British Raj and became the residence of the first Prime Minister of India, Jawaharlal Nehru, who stayed there for 16 years until his death on 27 May 1964. It was designed by Robert Tor Russell, the British architect of Connaught Place and of the Eastern and Western Courts on Janpath during the British Raj.

Teen Murti Bhavan was built in 1930 as part of the new imperial capital of India, New Delhi, as the residence of the Commander-in-Chief of the British Indian Army. This imposing structure covers a massive area of 12 hectares and was carved out of white stone and stucco to give it its signature look. The main entrance into the grounds of Teen Murti Bhavan is located on Teen Murti Marg, which was formerly called Roberts Road.

Prime Minister Indira Gandhi converted the residence into a museum. Today, Teen Murti Bhavan houses various institutions including the Prime Ministers' Museum and Library Society, which runs under the Indian Ministry of Culture, and the Pradhan Mantri Sangrahalaya, a memorial and museum to honour the Prime Ministers of India. The complex also houses the offices of the Jawaharlal Nehru Memorial Fund, established in 1964 under the chairmanship of S. Radhakrishnan, President of India. Teen Murti Bhavan also contains a number of mementos from various nations including England, Nepal, Somalia, China and others. Each memento represents a notable resource of each nation. The foundation also awards the Jawaharlal Nehru Memorial Fellowship, established in 1968.

Also contained within the complex are the Centre for Contemporary Studies and the Nehru Planetarium which opened in 1984.

== Etymology ==
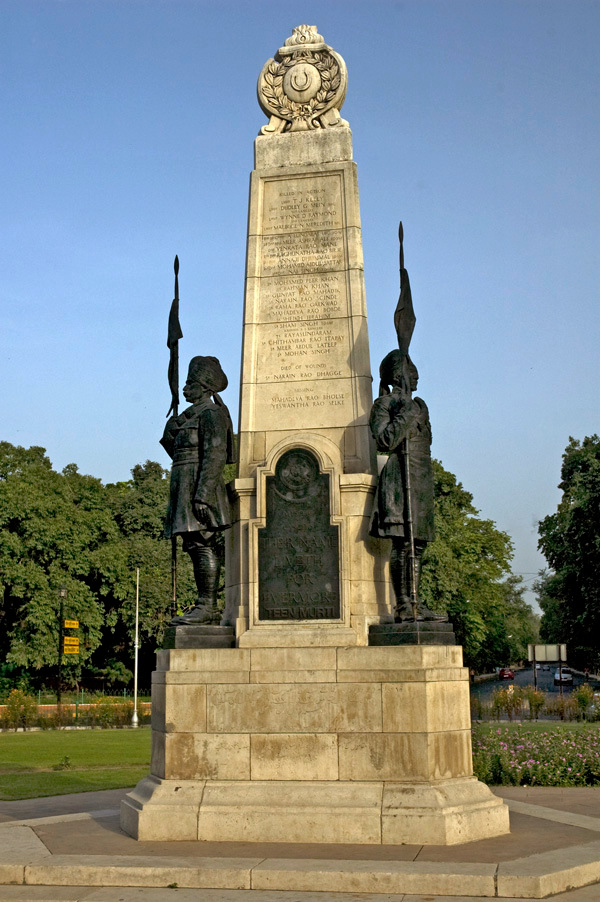
Teen Murti (three statues) Memorial built in 1922, outside Teen Murti Bhavan, which gives the building its name

The house is named after the Teen Murti (literally "three statues") Memorial by British sculptor, Leonard Jennings, which stands on the road junction in front of its extensive grounds. The memorial comprises life-size statues of three soldiers, and was built in 1922 in the memory of the Indian regiments named after the three Indian princely states from where they were raised, namely the Jodhpur Horse from Jodhpur State, the Hyderabad Horse from Hyderabad State, and the Mysore Horse from Mysore State, who participated in World War I with the British 15th (Imperial Service) Cavalry Brigade in Haifa, which was then part of the Ottoman Empire.

While soldiers from Jodhpur and Mysore took field in the actual war, those from Hyderabad were employed in maintaining communication channels and serving the injured. The Jodhpur soldiers led by Major Dalpat Singh Shekhawat were at the forefront and won the Haifa war with the help of Mysore and Hyderabad forces. Major Shekhawat died fighting at Haifa. He is known as Hero of Haifa.

== History ==
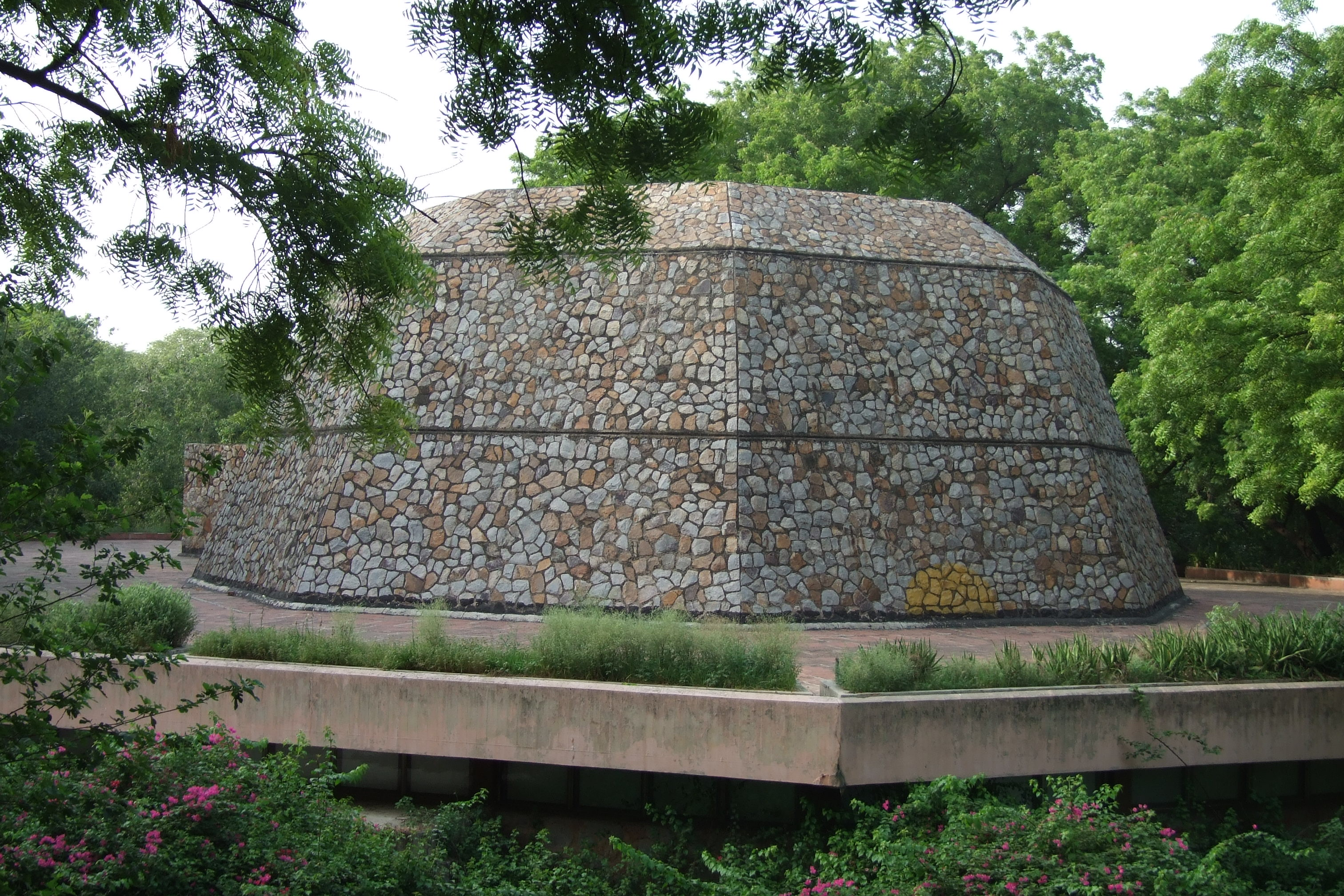
Nehru Planetarium, New Delhi

In 1911, the decision was made to transfer the winter capital of British India from Calcutta to Delhi (Simla remained the summer capital for the remainder of colonial rule). The slow, decades-long process of constructing the imperial complex in New Delhi commenced shortly thereafter.

Inaugurated as 'Flagstaff House' in 1930, the building was the winter headquarters and residence of the Commander-in-Chief of Forces in India who maintained unified command of the British Indian Army, British Army, and princely states forces. The road on which it stood was named after the 1st Earl Roberts, the Commander-in-Chief for over seven years between 1885 and 1893.

After independence in August 1947, the house became the year-round official residence and workplace of the Prime Minister, and Field Marshal Sir Claude Auchinleck relocated.

Following Jawarharlal's Nehru's death in office in May 1964, the house was converted into a national memorial to him comprising a library and a museum. Today, in a ground floor room of the Nehru Museum, his South Block office in the Ministry of External Affairs has been 'recreated' with the same furniture and other articles he used, along with several mementos, objects and manuscripts.

The complex has the headquarters of the Jawaharlal Nehru Memorial Fund, established in November 1964, Nehru Memorial Library, and also the Jawaharlal Nehru Fellowship. The Nehru Memorial Library is one of the finest ones for information on modern Indian history. Started in 1966, it functioned from the main building itself, till its present building was inaugurated within the complex grounds, in 1974.

Situated in a 12-hectare estate, the building is constructed of white stone and stucco, and faces the south side of Viceroy's House, known since 1950 as Rashtrapati Bhavan (President's House). It has an arched entrance, recessed windows, and the first floor has a pillared veranda on the back of the building, which overlooks the lawns.

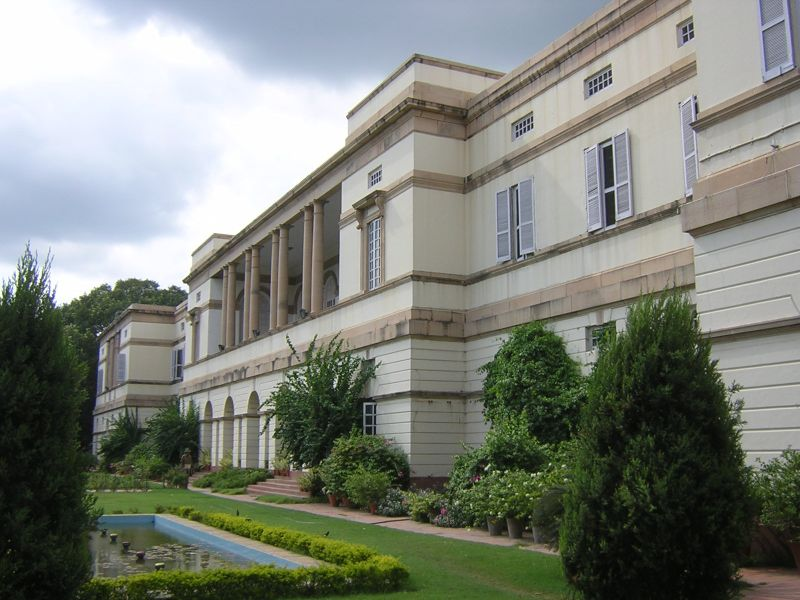
Teen Murti Bhavan, with pillared veranda overlooking the back lawn.

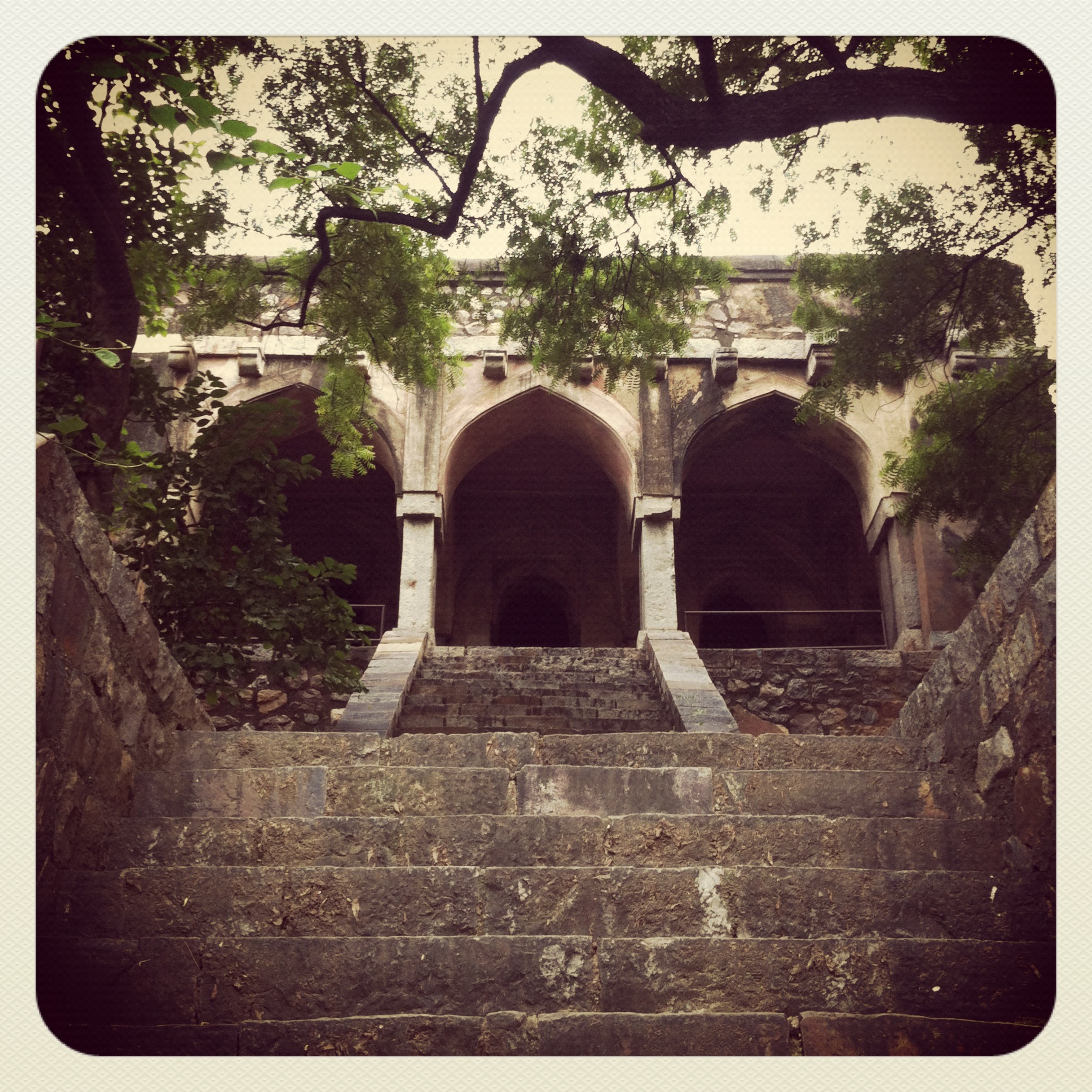
Sikargah or Kushak Mahal, 14th-century hunting lodge built by Firoz Shah Tughlaq.

One of the four Nehru Planetariums in India, is also situated in Teen Murti House grounds. It was inaugurated by the then Prime Minister (and Nehru's daughter), Indira Gandhi, on 6 February 1984. The planetarium's sky theatre is used for screening shows and as a gallery. The planetarium was reopened in September 2010, after renovations worth Rs. 11 crore, ahead of the 2010 Commonwealth Games and received Queen's Baton. It now has 'Definiti optical star projector "Megastar" that can show 2 million stars.

Close to the Nehru Planetarium within the Bhavan complex, stands the Shikargah, also known as Kushak Mahal, the hunting lodge of 14th-century ruler of the Sultanate of Delhi, Firoz Shah Tughlaq (r. 1351–1388 AD). Built on a high platform of rubble masonry accessed by stairs, the near square structure contains three open bays, containing arches, with each bay further divided into three compartments. Firoz Shah's fort, Firoz Shah Kotla was situated far away on the banks of Yamuna River. Though, the 1912 map of Delhi shows a stream flowing near it towards the Yamuna. The monument is today protected by Archaeological Survey of India (ASI), and the nearby Kushak Road is named after it.
