= Nehru Planetarium =

Five planetariums in India

Nehru Planetariums refer to five planetariums in India named after India's first Prime Minister, Jawaharlal Nehru. These are located in Mumbai, New Delhi, Pune, and Bengaluru. In addition, a sixth planetarium, the Jawahar Planetarium, is located in Prayagraj, where Nehru was born.

The Nehru Planetarium in New Delhi is situated on the grounds of Teen Murti Bhavan, previously known as 'Nehru Memorial Museum and Library', earlier the official residence of India's first Prime Minister, Jawaharlal Nehru and now a museum in his memory. In 1964, the Jawaharlal Nehru Memorial Fund was set up to promote his ideas and it undertook to build the Nehru Planetarium with its aim being the promotion of astronomy education. This planetarium, like its namesake in Mumbai, was also inaugurated by Smt. Indira Gandhi on 6 February 1984. One of the major attractions of this place is the Soyuz T-10 which carried India's first cosmonaut Rakesh Sharma to space, along with his space suit and mission journal.

The Sky Theatre shown at Jawaharlal Nehru Planetarium are very popular and attracts more than 200,000 visitors per year. The sky theatre is a dome shaped theatre. It shows information on constellations and planets. Visuals such as cartoons, paintings, computer animations, video clippings and special effects are liberally used in the programmes at the sky theatre.

The planetarium was reopened in September 2010, after renovations worth Rs. 11 crore, ahead of the 2010 Commonwealth Games and received Queen's Baton. It now has 'Definiti optical star projector "Megastar" that can show 2 million stars. It also sets up old telescopes, projection boxes and solar filters at its premises at major solar eclipses.

== Image Gallery ==
=== Nehru Planetarium, New Delhi ===
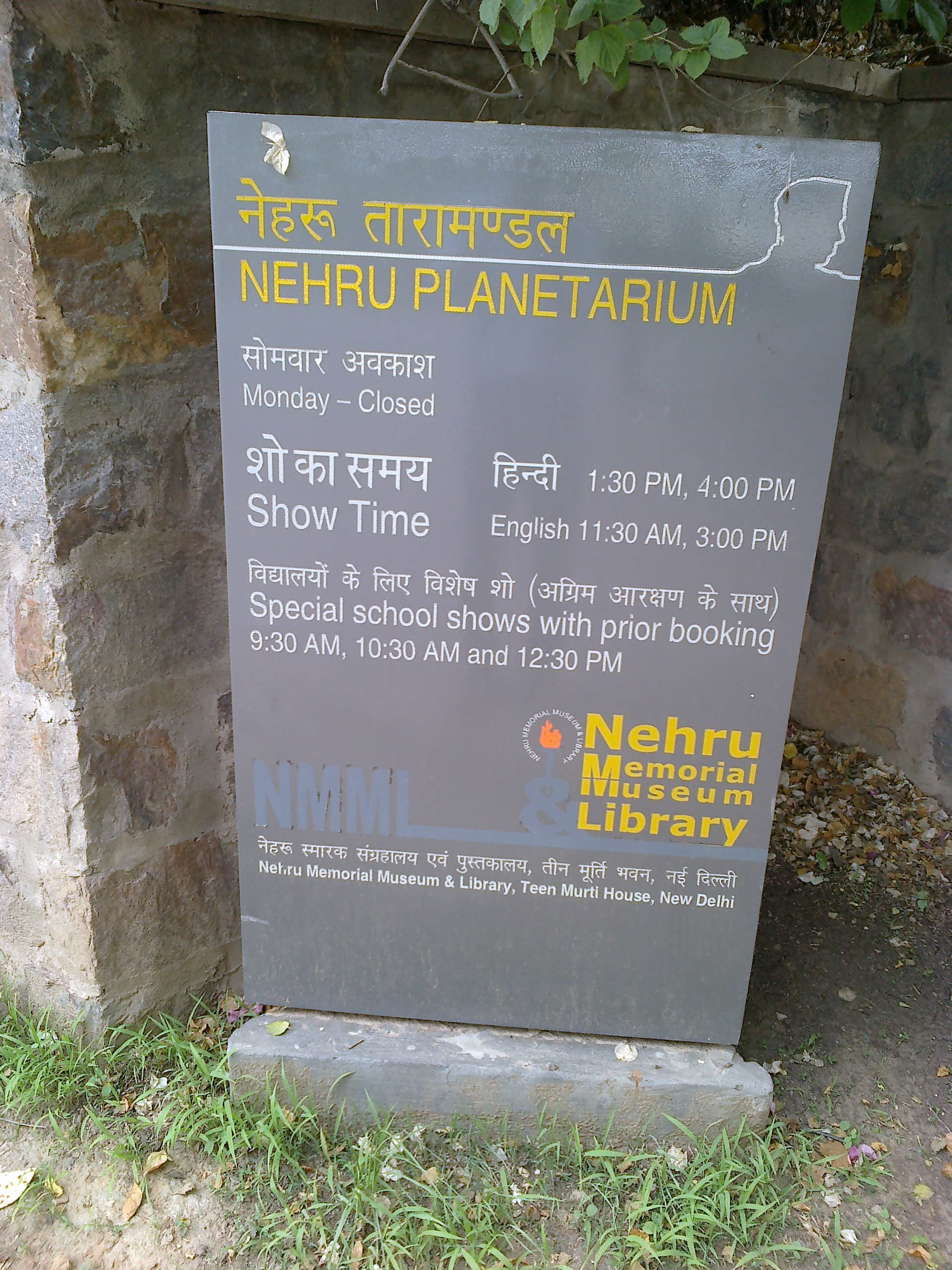
Entrance Stone

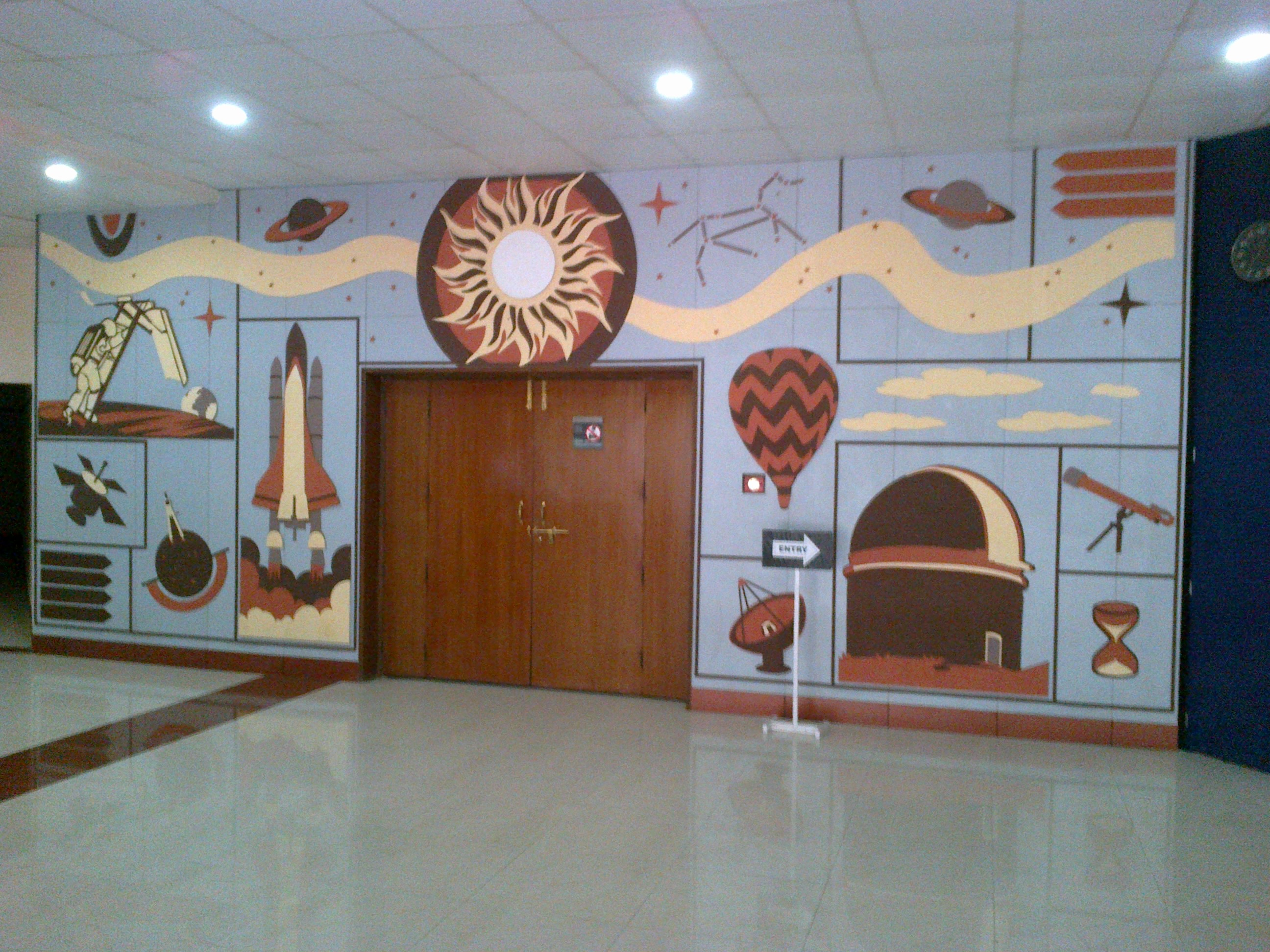
Entrance Wall

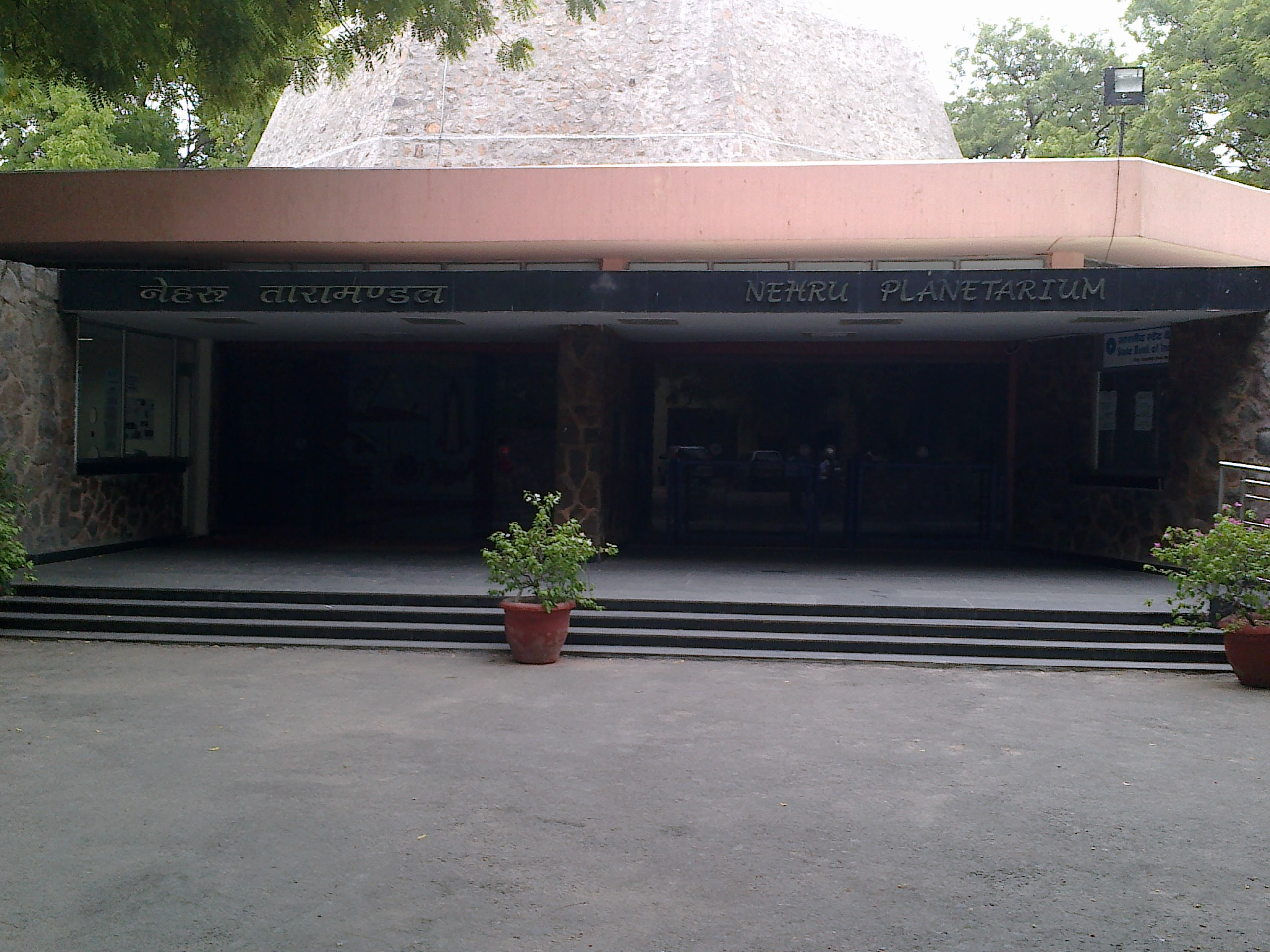
Entrance Gate

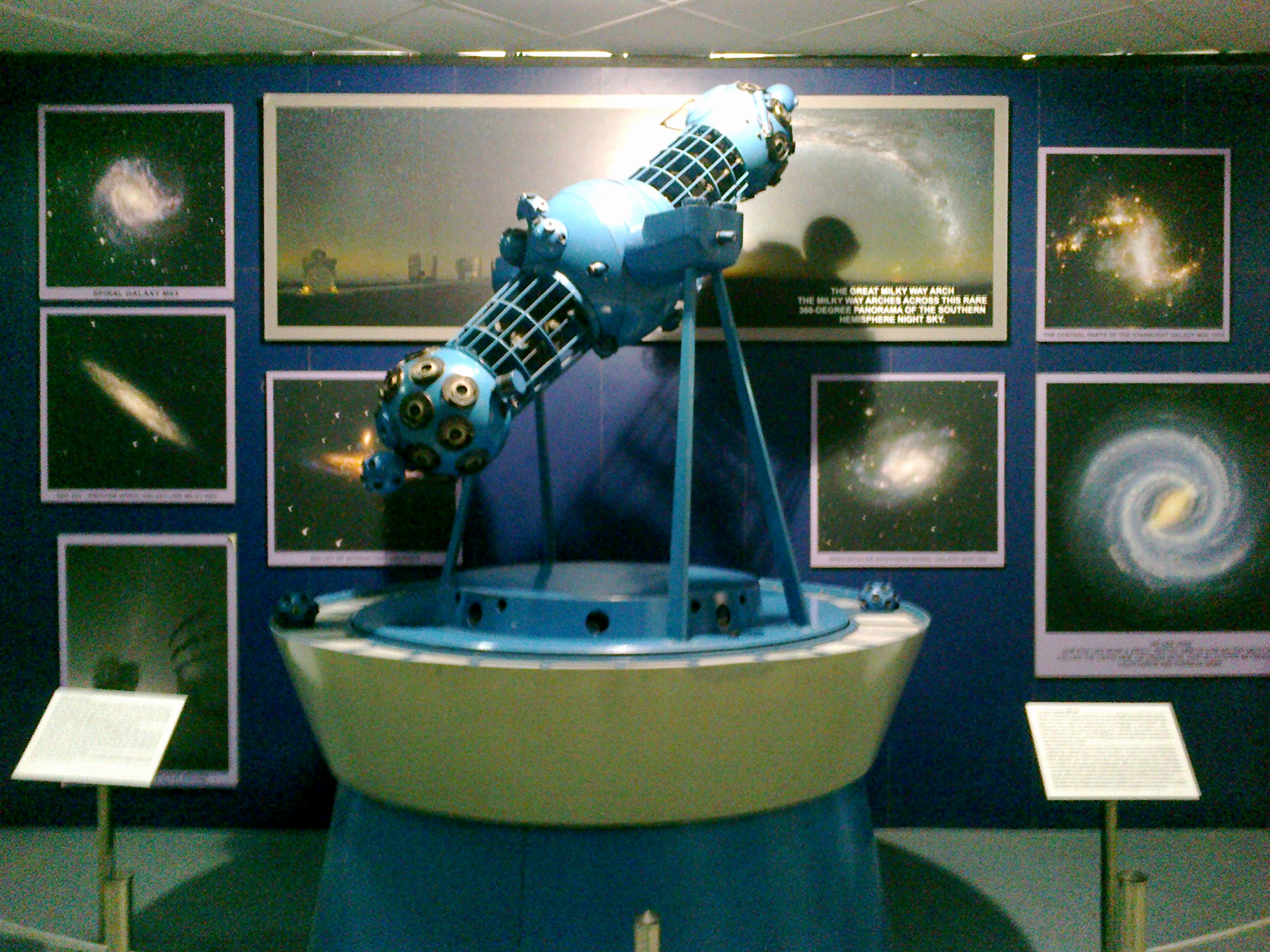
Antriksha Master Projector

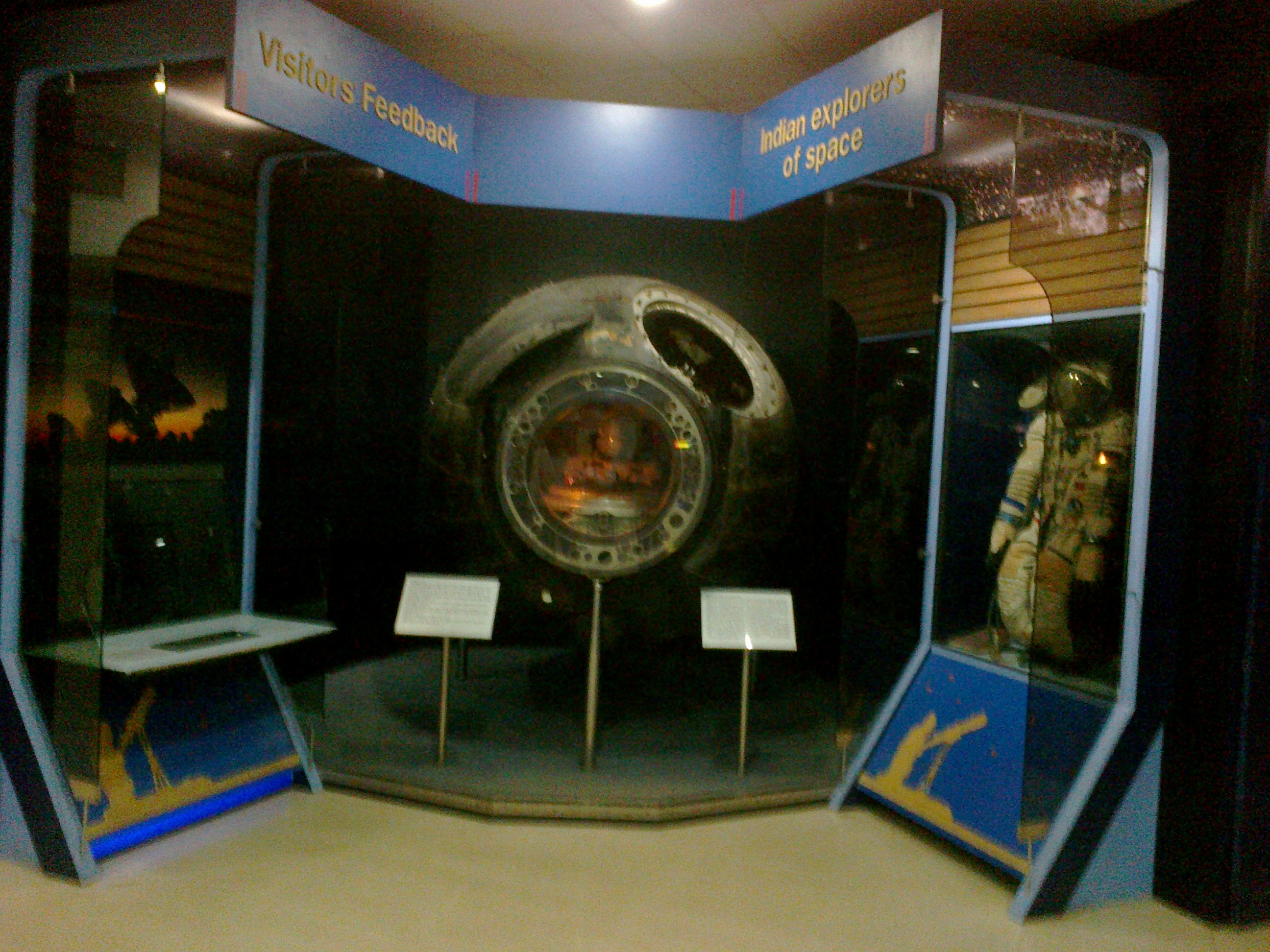
Soyuz T-10 used by Rakesh Sharma & others

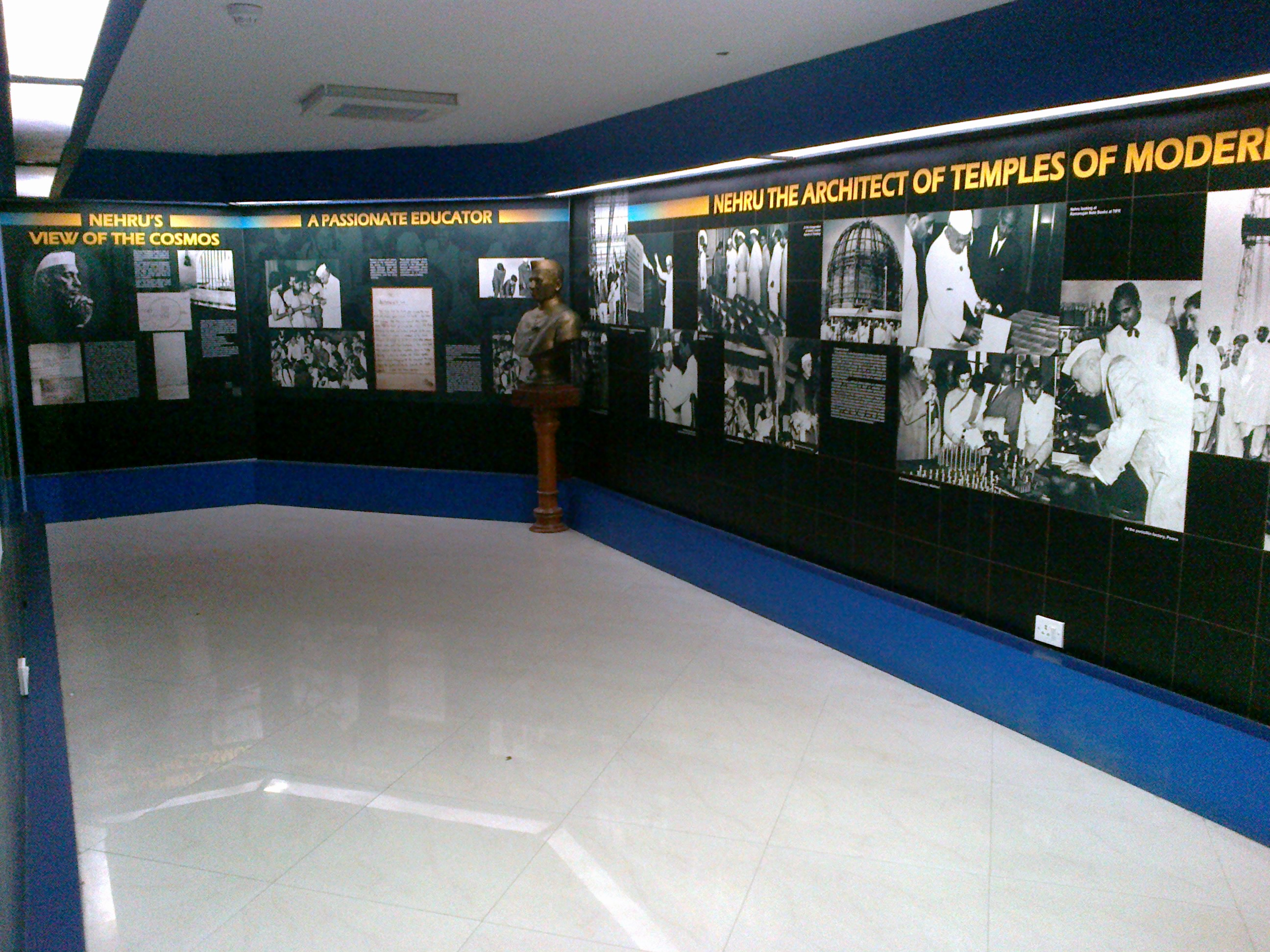
Gallery

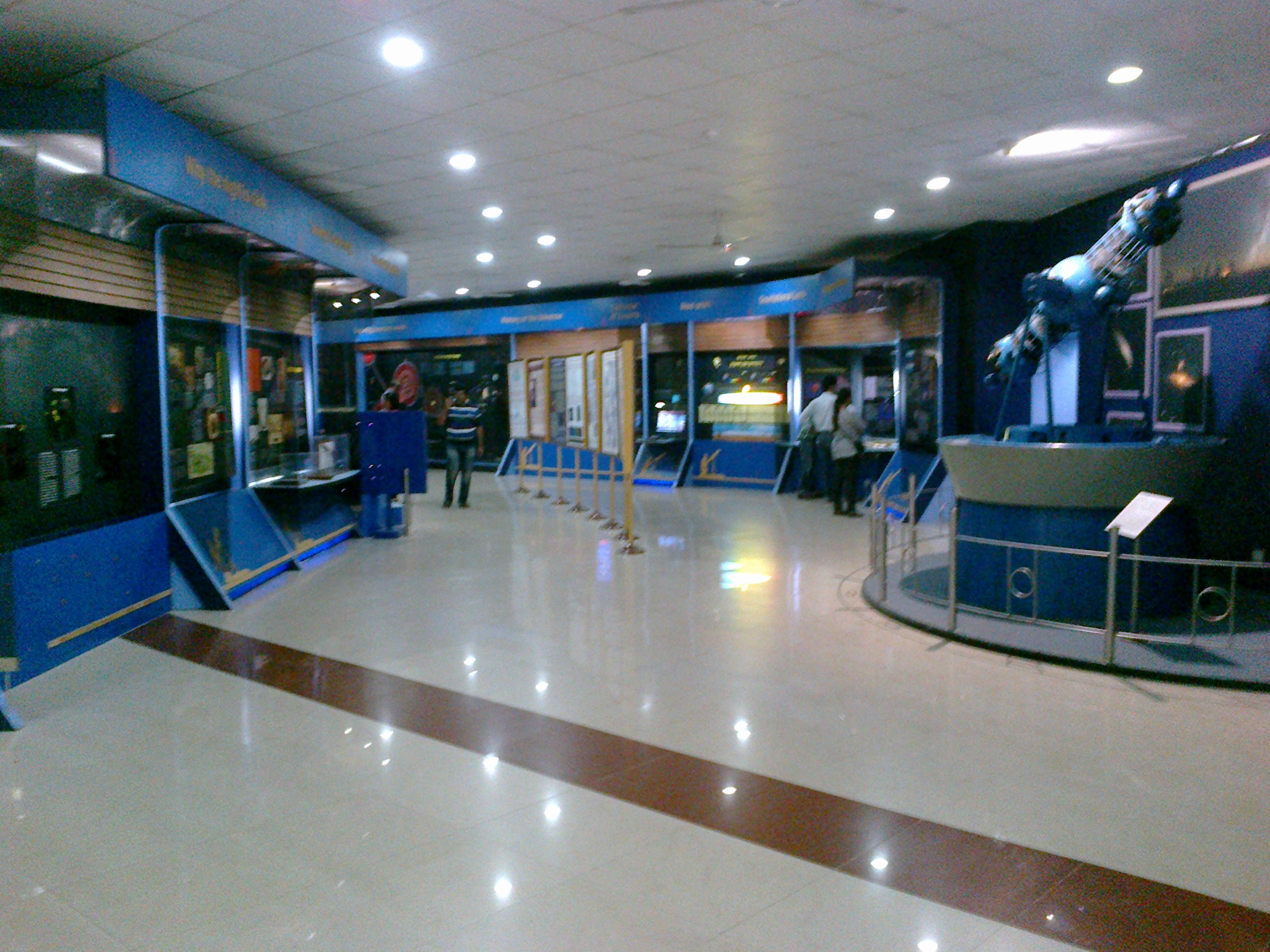
Main Gallery

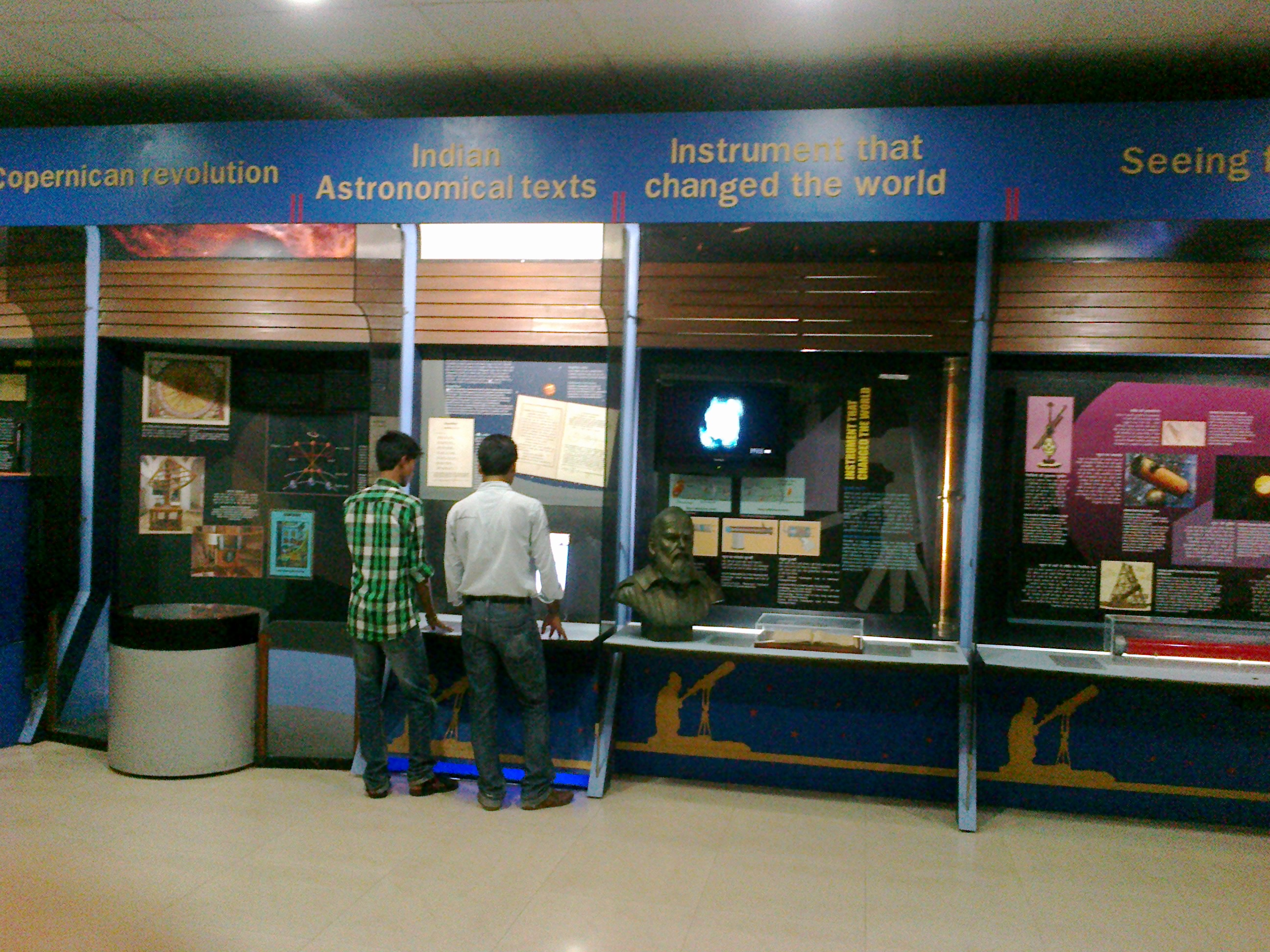
Main Gallery with some spectators

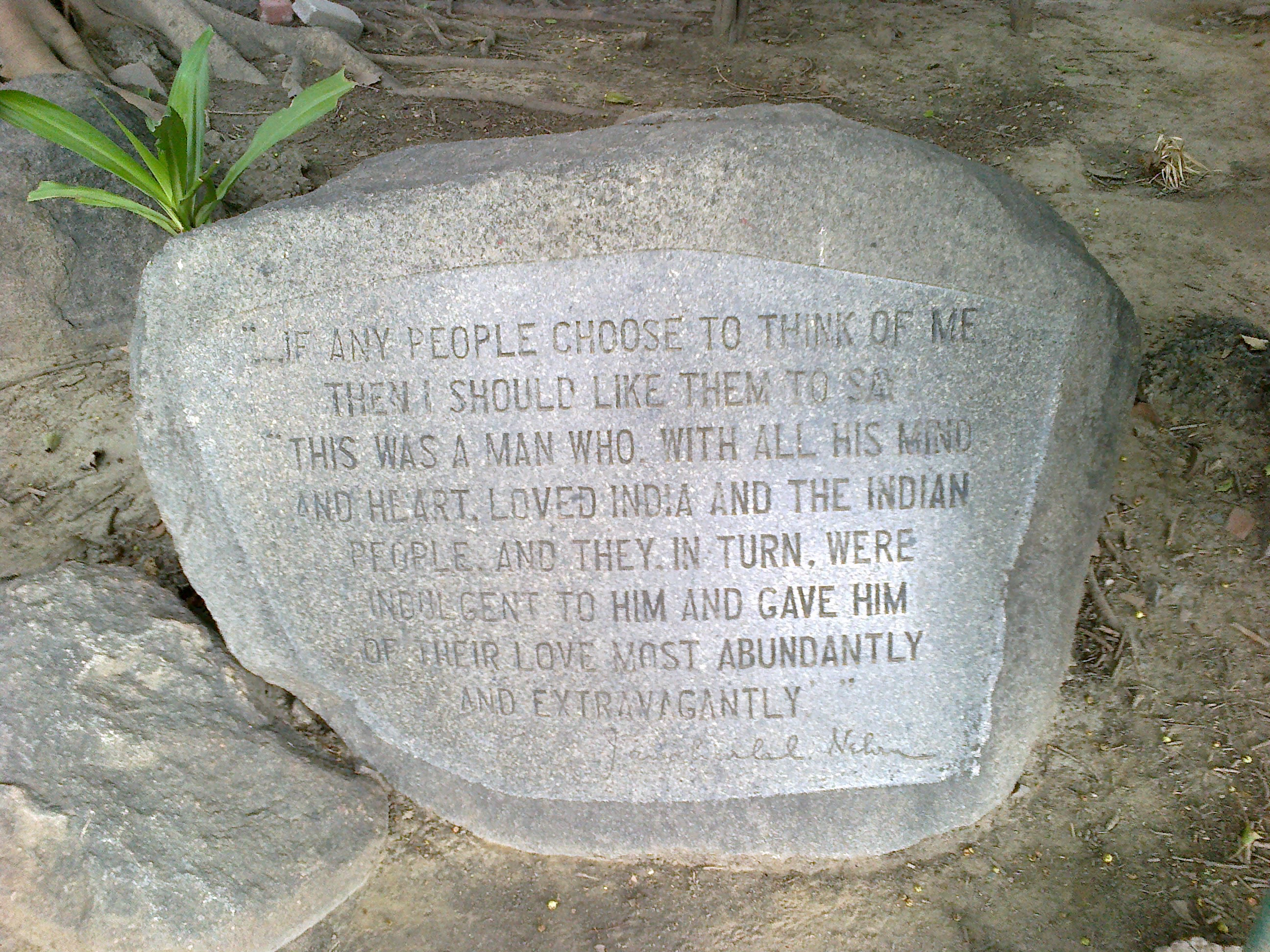
A Quote Stone

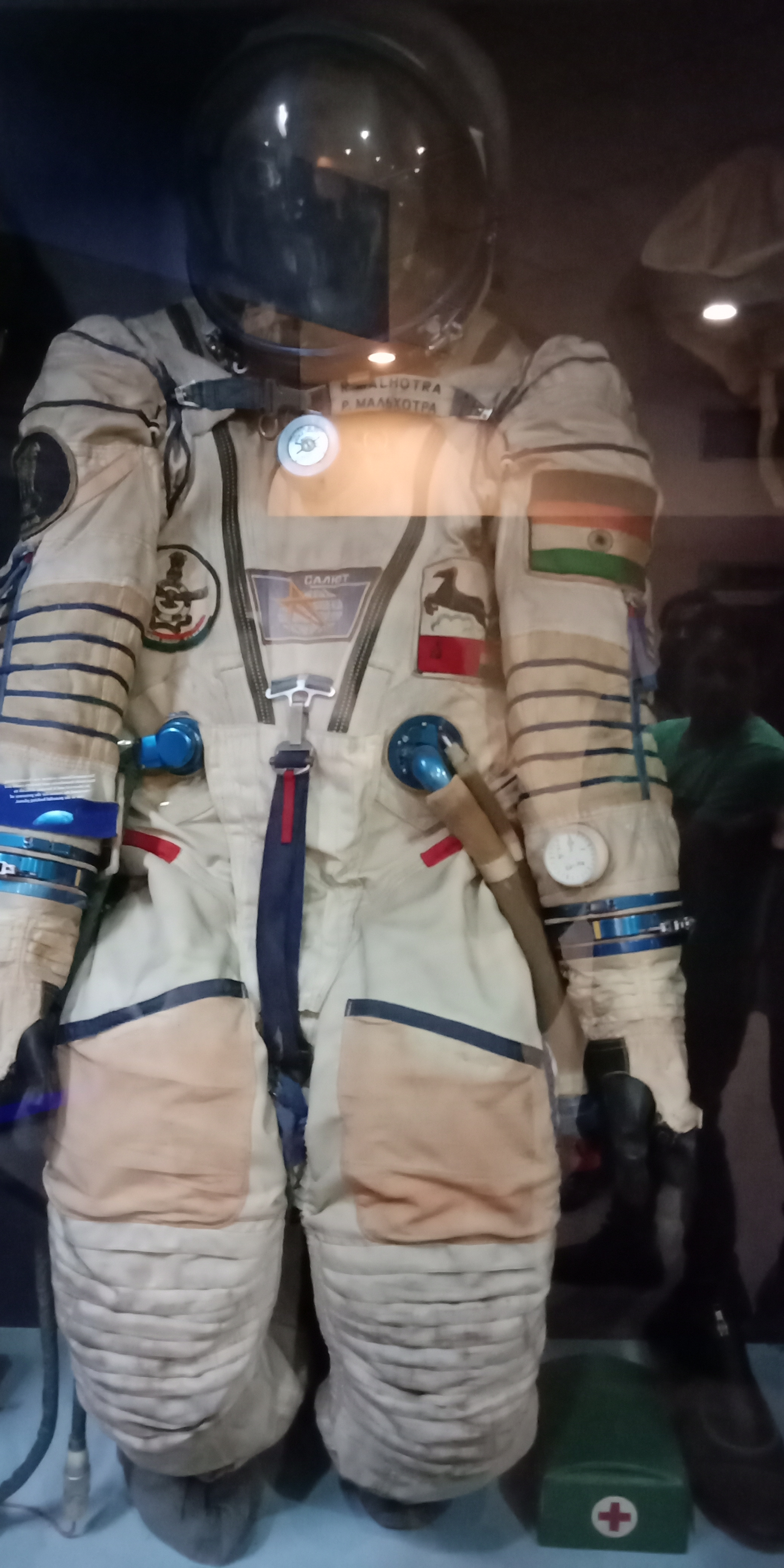
Space Suit used by Ravish Malhotra

== See also ==
- Astrotourism in India
- Swami Vivekananda Planetarium, Mangalore
- List of planetariums
