= Construction of New Delhi =

Planning and building of India's capital

The construction of New Delhi refers to the ambitious development project undertaken by the colonial British administration for the establishment of New Delhi, separate from Old Delhi (previously referred to as Shahjahanabad, which served as the capital of the erstwhile Mughal Empire), into the capital of the British Raj following its decision to relocate the imperial capital from Calcutta, and the creation of New Delhi in a mass-scale real estate development project fit to serve as the seat of the imperial administration. Heretofore, Delhi (referring to Old Delhi or Shahjahanabad) devolved from its reputation as the bustling and thriving capital of the Mughal Empire to an urban sprawl following the deposition of the last Mughal emperor. The British proposed the project after the Delhi Durbar in 1911 and work began in 1912; the onset of World War I, however, put a spanner in the works, and the project was delayed by around ten years till the 1920s. The New Delhi project concluded on February 13, 1931. The construction of New Delhi was overseen and fulfilled by architects Sir Edwin Lutyens and Sir Herbert Baker.

King George V and Queen Mary announced the project; it received major opposition from the European business community of Calcutta, along with Lord Curzon and Mahatma Gandhi.

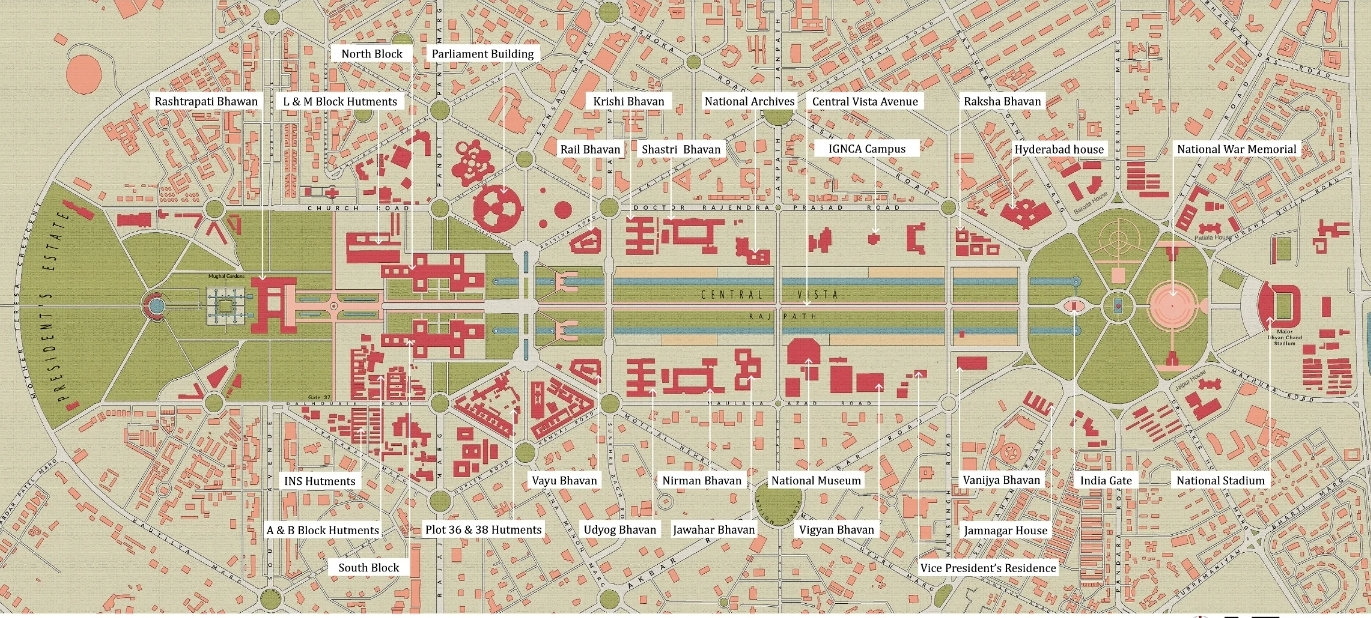
2019 master plan of the Central Vista of New Delhi, illustrating road and building layout

== Architecture, planning and early development ==
Sir Edwin Lutyens and Sir Herbert Baker were selected to design the area in a traditional Indian fashion. It dawned on the duo that the area where the foundation stones of Delhi were previously planted, Coronation Park, was an unsuitable area. They decided on the village Malcha on Raisina Hill, as it had a ridge whence stone could be quarried. Lutyens and Baker toured the country to collate their findings on the features gracing Indian architecture. They visited Hindu temples, Buddhist stupas, the Taj Mahal, and palaces in Bikaner and Mandi. They came back disappointed and convinced that there was no "Indian style of architecture" and only mushrooming dynasties who built large buildings. They noted that the Indians of old knew how to build grand forts, palaces, mausoleums, tombs and durbar halls, but not panchayat houses, legislative assembly buildings, or buildings for commoners.

The duo decided that they would give the buildings a semblance and façade of "Indianness", incorporating elements such as the sunbreaker (chhajja), latticed window (jali) and dome (chhattri), while the rest of the architecture would be almost entirely British in nature: the smorgasbord thus conceived would be distinctly European and Oriental alike. They elected to use stone used by the Mughals from the Vindhya Range, marble from Makrana and Jaipur, and both stone and marble from Dholpur. The original Viceregal Lodge was meant to be made in white marble, and Lutyens had envisioned its garden to be an English landscape one rather than Mughal in nature.

Lutyens devised a grand and ambitious plan for New Delhi, much larger than what had happened. His original plan was to dam the Yamuna behind Humayun's Tomb, create a huge lake and a riverside boulevard around it, and enclose the Purana Qila in a reflecting pool. In conjunction with the foregoing, he wished for the Kingsway to span from the Viceregal Lodge in the west all the way through India Gate up to the Purana Qila and for another road to be built from the South Block up to the south entrance of the Jama Mosque in Old Delhi. All these ideas had to be abandoned, the former two owing to costs and the latter because the road would have gone through Gurdwara Rakab Ganj: the Sikhs under Sardul Singh Kavishar were already in opposition. The Viceroy became peevish on account of the expenditures invested in Lutyens' plans, to which Lutyens wrote, "the Viceroy thinks only of the next three years, I am thinking of the next three hundred years."

Originally, Lutyens wanted to use the gridiron pattern of city planning as was used in other cities like New York, but the hexagonal pattern was later preferred as it could break up the dust storms that swept the landscape; for that same reason, the plan retained many roundabouts and hedges. Lutyens and Baker took inspiration from capitals like Washington, Canberra and Pretoria. There were three other sites which Lutyens and Baker had scouted and selected: east of the Yamuna, north of Shahjahanabad and west of Malcha Mahal. From 1914 to 1926, a temporary capital was built and occupied north of Old Delhi in Civil Lines, including the Delhi Assembly Building, where Europeans in Delhi primarily resided. While Baker and Lutyens were entrusted with designing the larger buildings, the connection between New Delhi and Old Delhi was designed by Robert Tor Russell, and named Connaught Place.

The Viceroy, Lutyens, and Baker were all in agreement on one notion though, the prognostication that India might eventually attain independence and that they were constructing the city as the building blocks for an independent India. Lutyens and Baker sparred often and had disagreements, one of which was Lutyens' desire to build the Viceregal Lodge on a higher level than the civil servants' offices, whereas Baker, imbued with the principles of egalitarianism, proposed that the ruler and his civil servants should exist on the same level. The King and Viceroy approved of Baker's idea. In another instance of diverging sentiments, Lutyens wanted the slope (gradient) between the Viceregal Lodge and the two secretariats to be at a steeper angle, driven by the desire to ensure it could be viewed in its entirety—from the base to the top—from a distance, whereas Baker believed that a gentle incline would be better since the notion of whether or not a pedestrian could see the lodge was moot. Lutyens was overruled yet again. The duo were not on speaking terms anymore, although New Delhi continued to be built.

During the early stages of modern Delhi's development in the wake of the Delhi Durbar, Sujan Singh and Sunder Singh Dhupia were the new capital's primary real estate developers, although their work came to a screeching halt during World War I. The foundation stones of Delhi were shifted from the Coronation Park to Raisina Hill by Sobha Singh, the son of Sujan Singh, in the dead of night to ward off superstitions held by the native populace.

== Construction ==
=== Labour ===
The labour included mainly the Bagaris of Rajputana. A number of them were known as Sangtarash—descendants of the people who built great Indian monuments such as the Red Fort, Old Fort, Taj Mahal, Fatehpur Sikri and others. There were also the Bandhanis of Punjab who were hired for their ability to carry larger loads. Cumulatively, around 30,000 workers toiled at the height of construction, all working under a Scotsman named Cairn. Men were paid eight annas a day whereas women were paid six annas a day. The contractors were almost all Sikhs, with the demographic makeup being 26 Sikhs, 3 Punjabi Muslims and 1 Sindhi Hindu.

After World War I came to an end, the British once again started concentrating on the development projects in Delhi. The project was mainly done under five Sikhs (known locally as the Panj Pyare of Delhi) who were Sir Sobha Singh, Dharam Singh Sethi, Baisakha Singh, Narain Singh and Ram Singh Kabli. By 1929 all major buildings had been completed. Although there was opposition, many called it (specifically the Viceregal Lodge) a "British matron in a fancy dress."

=== Construction work ===
==== Material ====
Dharam Singh Sethi had a monopoly on the marble and stone trade in North India. He transported the materials from Dholpur, Rajasthan. His house later became the office for the All India Congress Committee. Ram Singh Kabli had a monopoly over pottery and clay supplies and thus contributed some of them to almost all houses created in the project, including design and furniture. Sir Teja Singh Malik was the chief engineer who received a knighthood for helping in the construction of Delhi by supplying timber. He also heavily assisted Lutyens and Baker in their designs.

==== Labour ====
Sir Sobha Singh had been given the role of chief contractor by the British, and had also become a subordinate architect. He was also involved in increasing commerce in Delhi, which at the time did not have any major markets. He was the driving force behind Connaught Place, his brainchild to make Delhi an economic hub. He had finalized the contracts for Janpath, Connaught Place, the Viceregal Lodge, Sujan Singh Park, the Regal Building, Jaipur Column and many houses in the Lutyens Bungalow Zone including Scindia House, Kochin House, Baroda House and others. He owned around half of Connaught Place at the time, becoming known in Delhi's folklore as "Adhi Dilli ka Malik", the God of Half of Delhi.

Narain Singh (originally a peasant whose father was rumored to have been a dacoit) oversaw most of the road development for the new city and laid the foundation for the Parliament House. The Imperial Hotel was built by him; it housed many meetings between Nehru, Gandhi, Jinnah and Mountbatten when they were finalizing the Partition of India. His son Ranjit Singh, who earned money off his sugar mills in Uttar Pradesh, also helped.

Baisakha Singh constructed various official residencies, including the Jinnah House and North Block of the Viceroy's Lodge. He also supplied cement for roads and food supplies for the labourers. Sewa Singh continued the development of Delhi, and also that of neighbouring zones. The Karol Bagh land auction was organized by him. Manohar Singh, father of Patwant Singh, was put in charge of supervising the North Block. Lachhman Singh Gill, who later became the Chief Minister of Punjab, constructed large tracts in East Delhi, which was originally barely inhabited in 1937 and would not be densely populated till 20 years later.

Lacchman Das and Seth Haroun Al-Rashid, both Sindhis, constructed the Government House and the exterior of the North Block. Akbar Ali from Jhelum and Nawab Ali of Rohtak, both Punjabi Muslims, laid the foundation of the National Archives and Mughal Gardens, respectfully.

==== Plantation ====
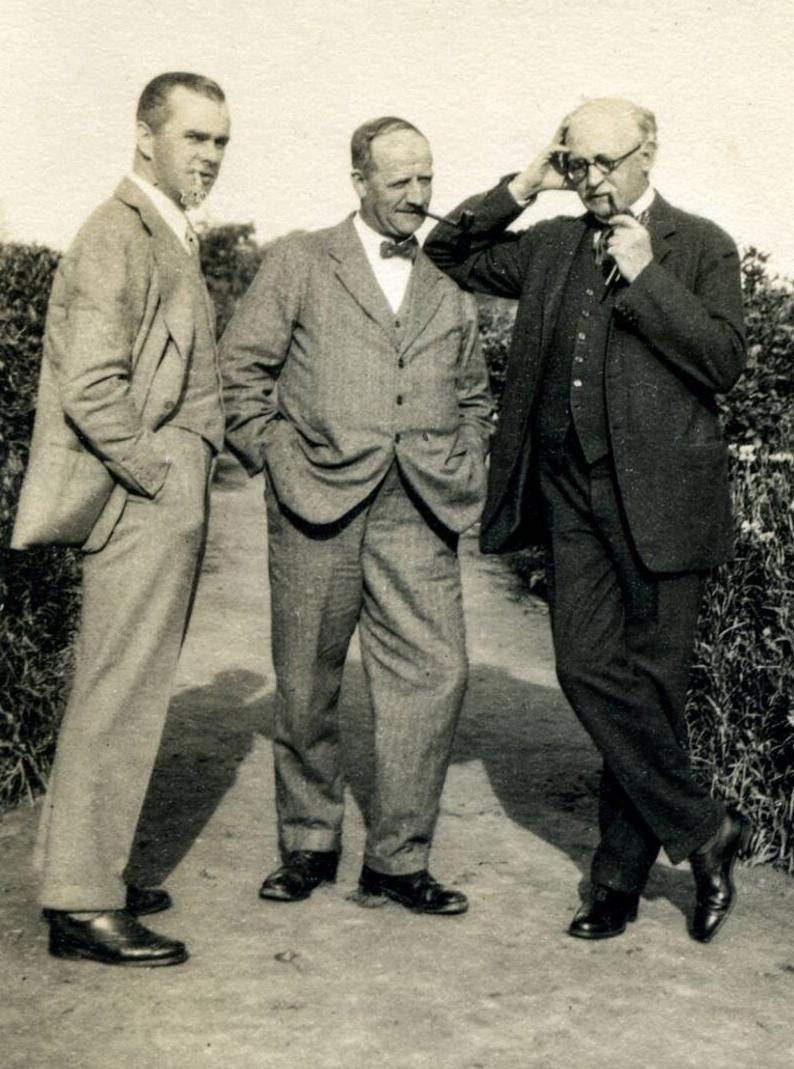
Arthur Shoosmith, Mustoe and Edwin Lutyens in Delhi, 1930

As soon as Lutyens had marked the roads, his team got William Robert Mustoe, a Kew-trained gardener to set up a huge nursery, Sunder Nursery. It is next to Humayun's tomb. He had 500 varieties of trees, Australian, East African and indigenous, shipped to Delhi while the roads were being laid. Along Rajpath, jamun trees were planted. Sausage trees, gum trees and African tulip trees from East Africa were planted in other areas. Sir Sobha Singh had once stated that those "slow-growing trees would provide shade to our great-great-great grandsons and their grandsons." Queen Victoria had once before come and cut down all the gum trees and replaced them with cypress trees, but after Lutyens' protest the damage was undone.

The Delhi Ridge had been planted with North Indian rosewood, Madras thorn, Indian siris, Australian eucalyptus and Mexican mesquite.

== Aftermath ==
The construction of New Delhi was perhaps one of the inaugural instances of the British Raj entrusting Indians to high positions instead of designating Englishmen. Sir Teja Singh Malik was made the first Indian head of the Central Public Works Department and Sir Sobha Singh was made the first Indian to head the New Delhi Municipal Council.

Uttam Singh Duggal, an aristocratic Partition refugee, held a monopoly over construction work and real estate in Delhi. In the late 20th century, his firm built the Jawaharlal Nehru Stadium. Mohan Singh (known as Mohan Singh Coca-Cola) constructed the Embassy of the United States, New Delhi, Friends' Colony, and Mohan Singh Place.

By the 2000s, development shifted to areas straddling the Delhi Union Territory, such as Gurgaon, Haryana and Noida, Uttar Pradesh, overseen by companies such as the Wave Group and DLF. These sister cities would draw industry and jobs from Delhi. By the 2020s, work was underway to redevelop the Central Vista with new Parliament and Cabinet Secretariat buildings, offices for the Prime Minister, Vice President and Defence Ministry, and new landscape architecture.

The vast majority of structures, streets, and edifices constructed by the imperial British government underwent a wave of rechristening after Indian politicians, leaders, and rulers following independence, with only a rare minority—peppered across Delhi—retaining their original names.
