= William Robert Mustoe =

English gardener and landscaper

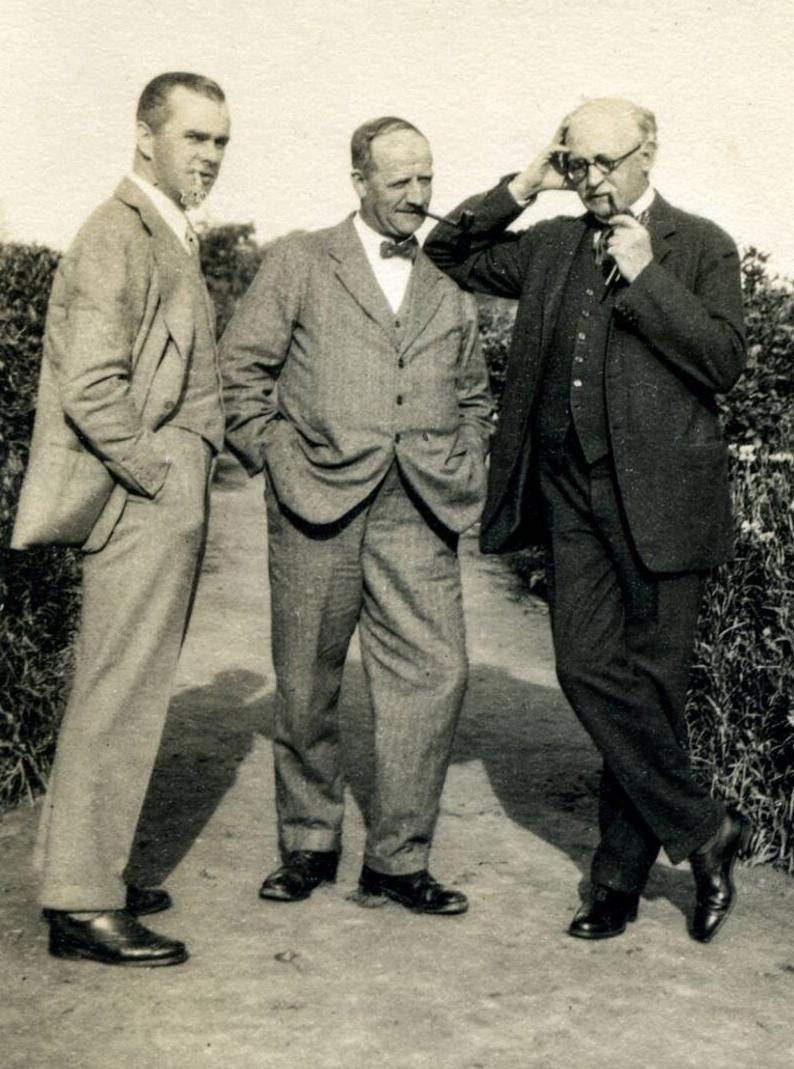
- Arthur Shoosmith, Mustoe and Edwin Lutyens in Delhi, 1930
- Born: June, 1878
- Died: 22 July 1942
- Other name: W.R. Mustoe
- Occupations: Gardener and landscaper

William Robert Mustoe (June 1878 – 22 July 1942) was a Kew-trained English gardener and landscaper involved in the layout of gardens and avenues best known for his work in planning the gardens and avenues of the new capital city of New Delhi, working in association with the architect Edwin Lutyens.

== Biography ==
Mustoe was born in Leckhampton, where his father was a gardener. Following the family trade, he trained in horticulture at Dicksons nursery in Chester and then for private estate owners. He gained an interest in tropical plants after working in glasshouses at Sundridge Park of Sir Samuel Scott and in 1903 he applied for a position at the Kew glasshouses. Older than most applicants, he was accepted in 1904 and was recommended by Sir William Thiselton-Dyer in the following year for a vacancy in northern India. Although found to have defective vision, he was accepted, and he worked for a while in the Municipal Gardens of Bombay. In 1905 he moved to the gardens in Lahore, where he succeeded W.R. Brown as a superintendent, conducting tests on 120 species of Eucalyptus for suitability. He was involved in the landscaping of the Punjab camp at the Coronation Durbar of 1911.

Mustoe began interplanting fast-growing Eucalyptus rudis and slower-growing Terminalia arjuna in avenues with the idea of cutting off the Eucalyptus once the Terminalia established. He published his experiences in 1915 as Notes Upon Roadside Arboriculture. Mustoe was selected to assist Edwin Lutyens with landscaping of the new capital of Delhi. Mustoe succeeded A.E.P. Griessen, who was on the verge of retirement. A nursery was established at Talkatora Bagh, and discussions on the choice of plants and their spacing in avenues took place with Lutyens and his assistant Walter George.

He was involved in the afforestation of the Delhi Ridge, for which he promoted the use of Prosopis juliflora. Mustoe was also involved in the landscaping of the Viceroy's garden, now known as Amrit Udyan of the Rashtrapati Bhavan. Lady Hardinge influenced the choice of a Mughal design, and she was in turn influenced by Constance Villiers-Stuart and her Gardens of the Great Mughals (1913). Mustoe was also employed in the design of the Lodhi Golf Course in 1931, in preparation for which he also learned the sport.

Mustoe was appointed an Officer of the Order of the British Empire in the 1930 New Year Honours, and he retired to England and lived at Ashtead, Surrey, from 1934. He, however, visited India in 1938 on the invitation of Lord Linlithgow to review changes in the Viceregal garden made since Lord Willingdon's tenure. Another trip was made in 1942, on which he had an accidental fall while in Jodhpur, which led to his death.

== See also ==
- Construction of New Delhi
