= A.E.P. Griessen =

English gardener

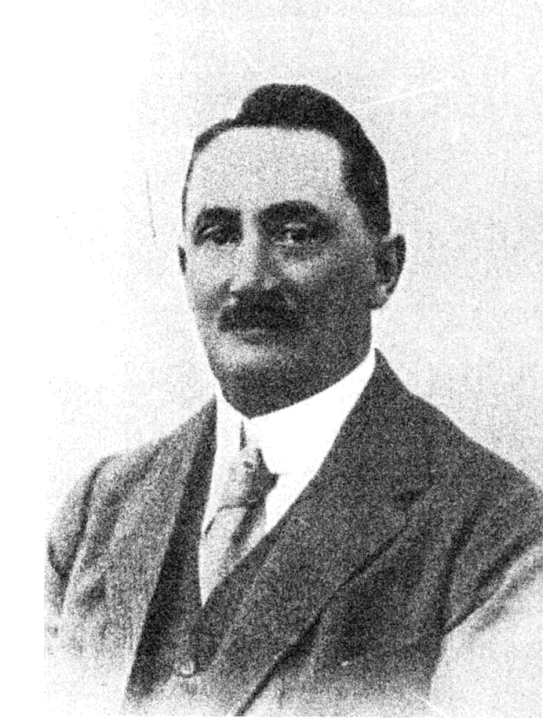

Albert Edward Peter Griessen (French form Albert Edward Pierre Griessen) (1875 – 6 October 1935) was a Kew-trained English gardener who was involved in the landscaping of the Indian capital city of New Delhi along with architect Edwin Lutyens and later the gardener William Robert Mustoe. He also worked on archaeology and restoration of ancient monuments within the lands that he was in his charge.

Griessen was born in London and educated in France and at London, he trained at Kew as a gardener from 1896 and worked as a subforeman until 1898. He was posted to the Sibpur Botanical Gardens in Calcutta and later served as superintendent of the gardens at Agra, involved in work around Taj Mahal, McDonnell Park and surroundings. Under Lord Curzon and Griessen, the Taj Mahal gardens which earlier consisted of fruit trees were altered to have few fruit trees, presumably to prevent pilferage by visitors. After the design of numerous parks in Agra, he was involved in the design of the Delhi area before the Coronation Durbar of Lord Curzon (1903) and the Delhi Durbar of 1911. He also worked on other ceremonial projects during visits of the Prince and Princess of Wales (1905) and the Emir of Afghanistan (1907). During the 1913 Durbar, with visitors from across India, there was a congregation of Kew gardeners who were working in other provinces or native states which included Robert Henry Locke, W.R. Mustoe, Ernest Long, E. Little, John Thomas Johnson, W.G. Head (1837–1897) and Hermann Krumbiegel.

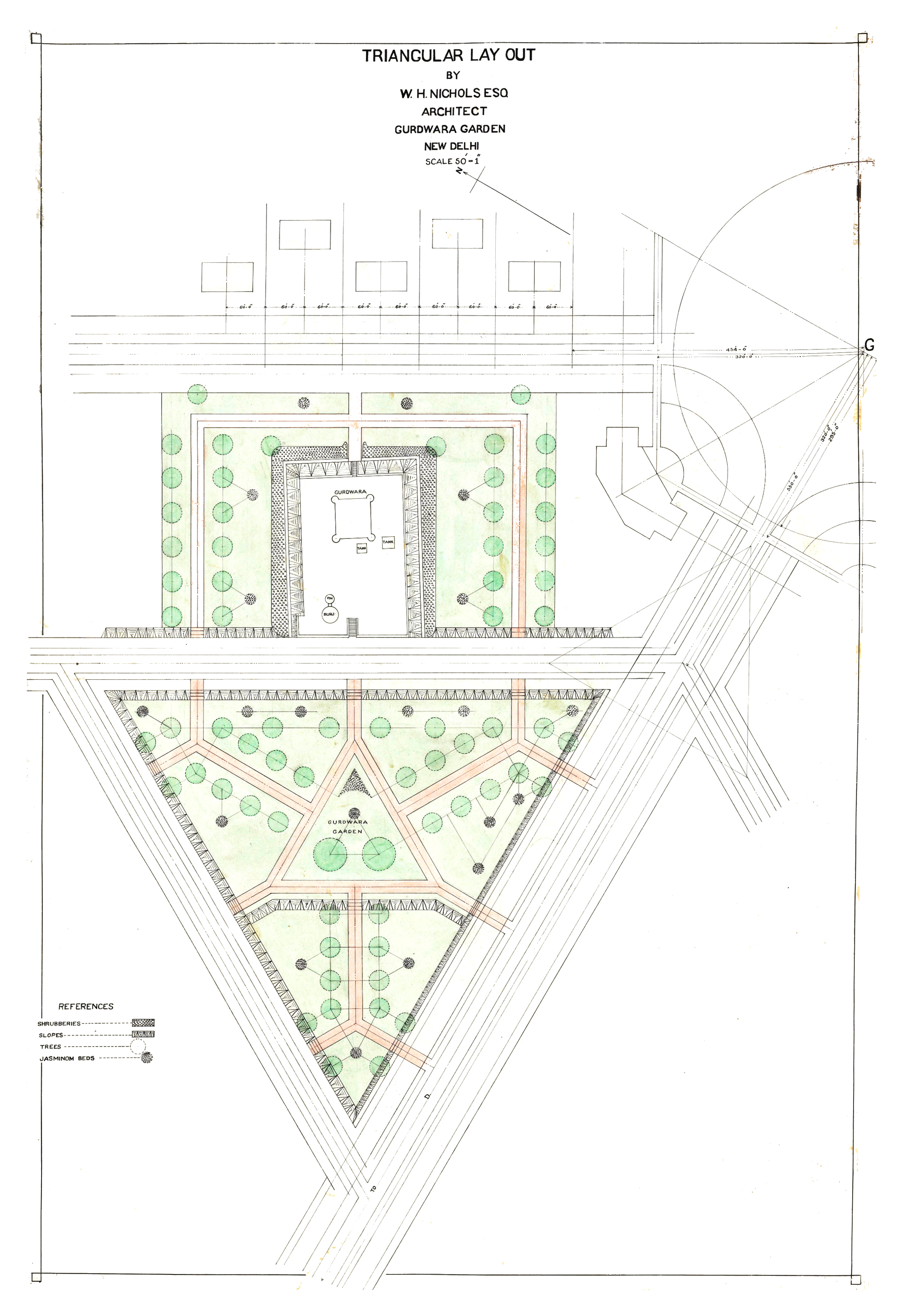
Griessen's design for Gurudwara Bangla Sahib

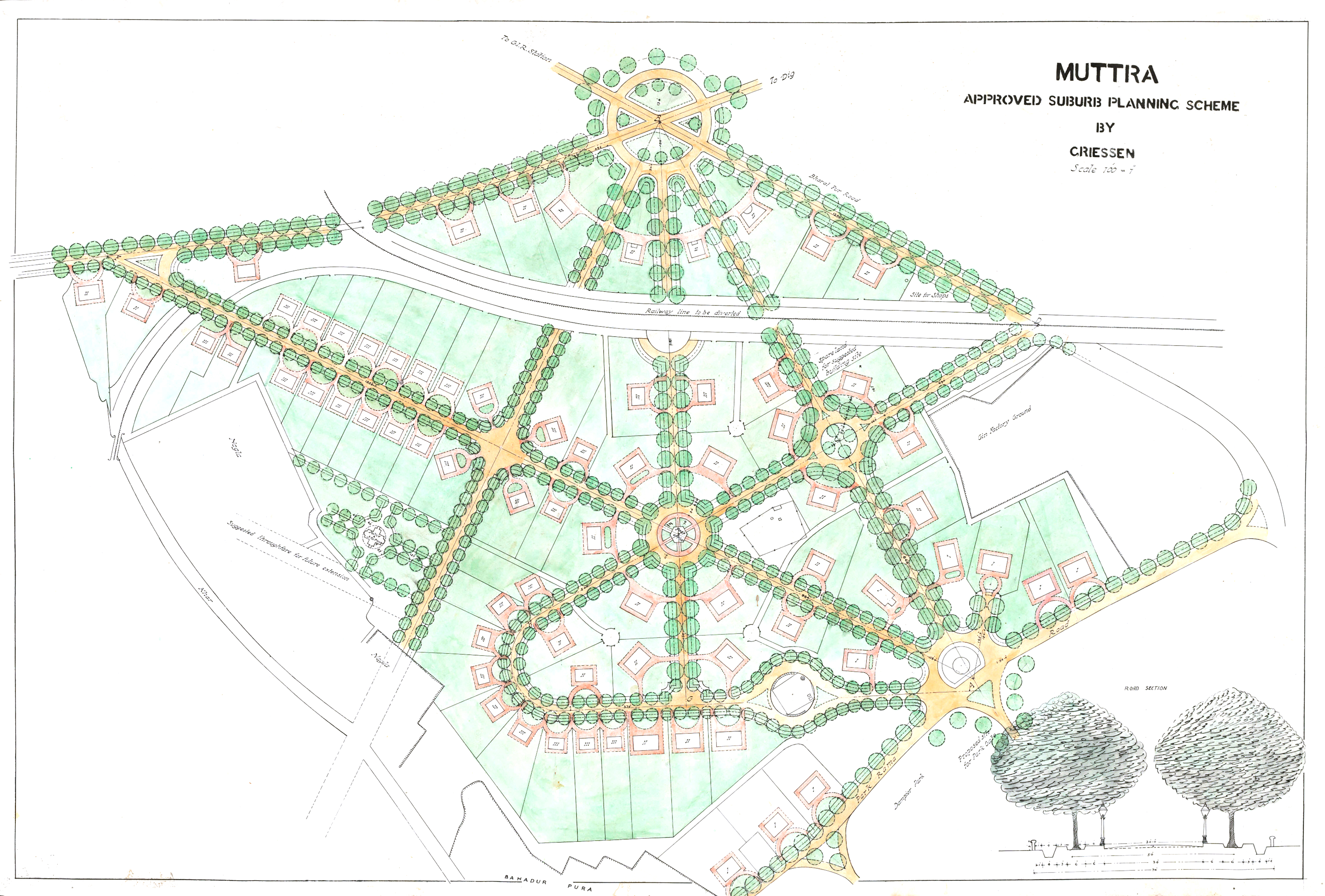
Plan for Mathura garden

Griessen published several notes in English and in French and these include:

- Horticulture in France
- India Town Planning Notes (Muttra)
- Rural Arboriculture with Vernacular Translations
- De l'Adaptation de certaines Especes
- The Evolution of the Moghul Gardens of the Plains in India
- Quelques Arbres a Fleurs de l'Inde
- De la Distribution de certaines Especes sur la Globe Terrestre
- Causerie sur les Palmiers des Indes

He was awarded the Royal Victorial Medal and the Kaiser-i-Hind medals. He went on furlough in 1928 and he was requested to serve in India for an extended period but he refused and retired in 1930 and settled at Craven Park.
