= Origins and architecture of the Taj Mahal =

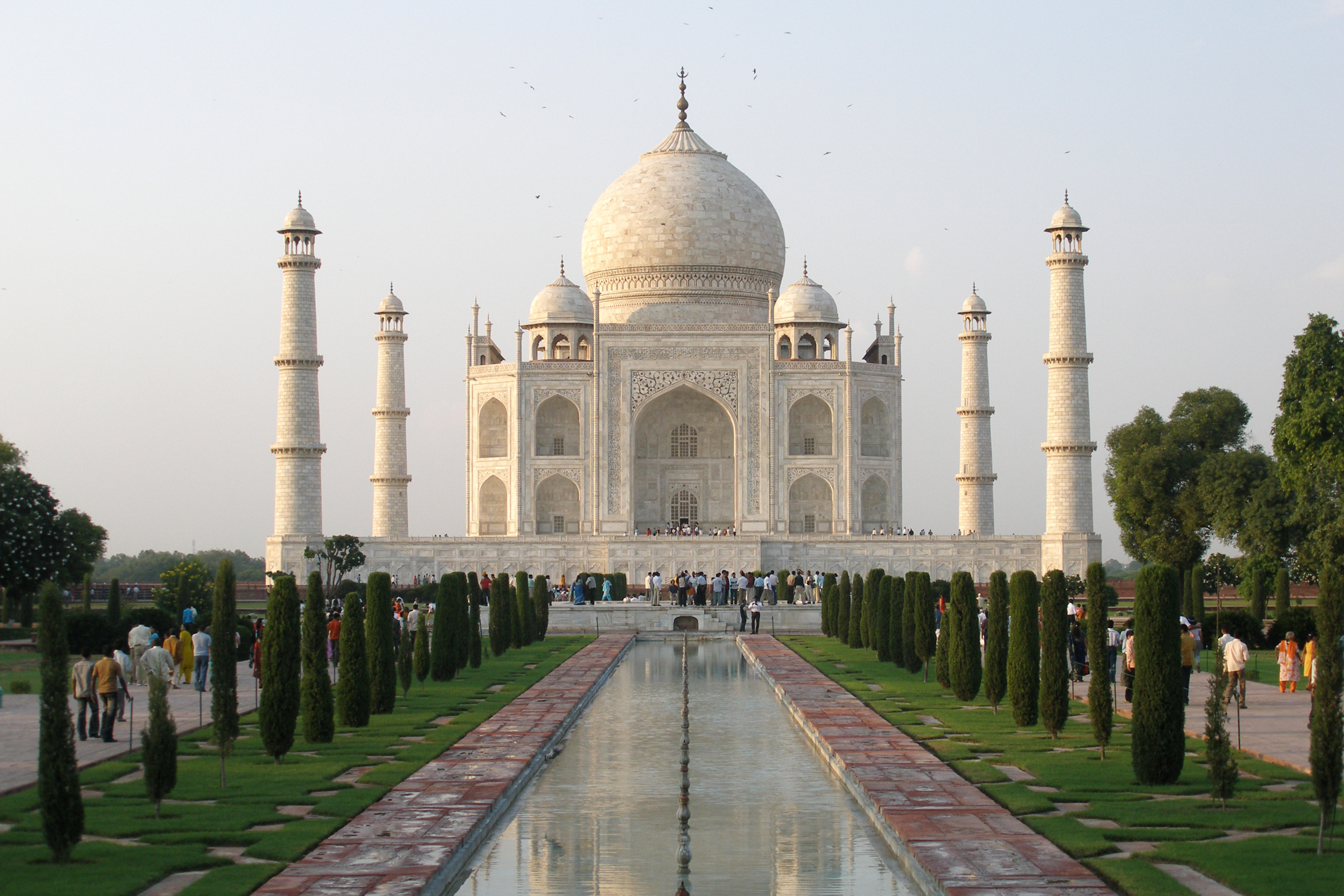
Mausoleum of the Taj Mahal complex at Agra, India

The Taj Mahal represents the finest and most sophisticated example of Indo-Islamic architecture. Its origin lies in the moving circumstances of its commission and the culture and history of an Islamic Mughal Empire's rule of large parts of India. The distraught Mughal Emperor Shah Jahan commissioned the project upon the death of one of his favorite wives, Mumtaz Mahal.

A masterpiece of the Mughal chief architect Ahmad ma'mar, it is one of the most famous and recognizable buildings in the world today. While the large, domed marble mausoleum is the most familiar part of the monument, the Taj Mahal is an extensive complex of buildings and gardens that extends over 22.44 hectares (55.5 acres) (Note: The UNESCO evaluation omits the Bazaar, Caravenserai (Taj Ganji) and Moonlight garden (Mahtab Bagh) from its area calculations – the total area with the historic Taj Ganji is 26.95 ha) and includes subsidiary tombs, waterworks infrastructure, the small town of Taj Ganji to the south and a 'moonlight garden' to the north of the river. Construction of Taj Mahal began in 1632 AD, (1041 AH), on the south bank of the River Yamuna in Agra, and was substantially complete by 1648 AD (1058 AH). The design was conceived a version of the house of Mumtaz Mahal in paradise.

== Mumtaz and Shah Jahan ==
Animation showing the Taj Mahal (English subtitles)

In 1607 (AH 1025) the Mughal Prince Khurrum (later to become Shah Jahan) was betrothed to Arjumand Banu Begum, the granddaughter of a Persian noble. She would become the unquestioned love of his life. They were married five years later in 1612. After their wedding celebrations, Khurram "finding her in appearance and character elect among all the women of the time," gave her the title Mumtaz Mahal (Jewel of the Palace).

The intervening years had seen Khurrum take two other wives known as Akbarabadi Mahal and Kandahari Mahal, but according to the official court chronicler Qazwini, the relationship with his other wives "had little more than the status of marriage. The intimacy, deep affection, attention and favour which His Majesty had for the Cradle of Excellence [Mumtaz] lacked by a thousand times what he felt for any other."

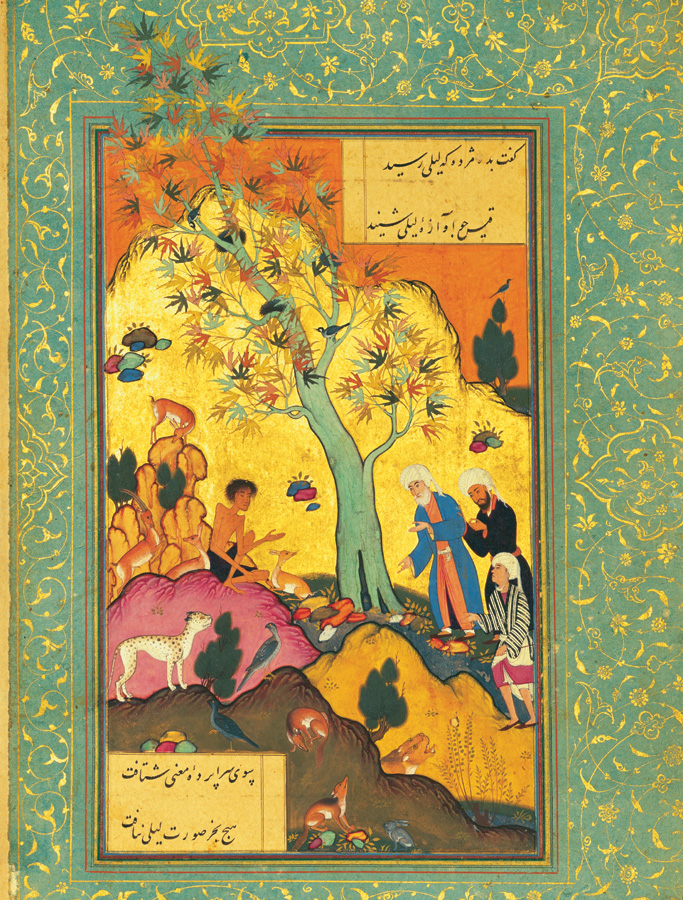
The epitome of chaste Muslim love – Majnun, going mad in the wilderness

Mumtaz died in Burhanpur on 17 June 1631, after complications with the birth of their fourteenth child, a daughter named Gauhara Begum. She had been accompanying her husband whilst he was fighting a campaign in the Deccan Plateau. Her body was temporarily buried in a garden called Zainabad on the banks of the Tapti River in Burhanpur. The contemporary court chroniclers paid an unusual amount of attention to this event and Shah Jahan's grief at her demise. Immediately after hearing the news, the emperor was reportedly inconsolable. He was not seen for a week at court and considered abdicating and living his life as a religious recluse. The court historian Muhammad Amin Qazwini, wrote that before his wife's death the emperor's beard had "not more than ten or twelve grey hairs, which he used to pluck out', turned grey and eventually white" and that he soon needed spectacles because his eyes deteriorated from constant weeping. Since Mumtaz had died on Wednesday, all entertainments were banned on that day. Jahan gave up listening to music, wearing jewelry, sumptuous clothes or perfumes for two years. So concerned were the imperial family that an honorary uncle wrote to say that "if he continued to abandon himself to his mourning, Mumtaz might think of giving up the joys of Paradise to come back to earth, this place of misery – and he should also consider the children she had left to his care." The Austrian scholar Ebba Koch compares Shah Jahan to "Majnun, the ultimate lover of Muslim lore, who flees into the desert to pine for his unattainable Layla."

Jahan's eldest daughter, the devoted Jahanara Begum Sahib, gradually brought him out of grief and fulfilled the functions of Mumtaz at court. Immediately after the burial in Burhanpur, Jahan and the imperial court turned their attentions to the planning and design of the mausoleum and funerary garden in Agra.

== Site ==
=== 16th–17th century Agra ===
The first Mughal garden was created in 1526 in Agra by Babur, the founder of the dynasty. Thereafter, gardens became important Mughal symbols of power, supplanting the emphasis of pre-Mughal power symbols such as forts. The shift represented the introduction of a new ordered aesthetic – an artistic expression with religious and funerary aspects and as a metaphor for Babur's ability to control the arid Indian plains and hence the country at large. Babur rejected much of the indigenous and Lodhi architecture on the opposite bank and attempted to create new works inspired by Persian gardens and royal encampments. The first of these gardens, Aram Bagh, was followed by an extensive, regular and integrated complex of gardens and palaces stretching for more than a kilometre along the river. A high continuous stone plinth bounded the transition between gardens and river and established the framework for future development in the city.

In the following century, a thriving riverfront garden city developed on both banks of the Yamuna. This included the rebuilding of Agra Fort by Akbar, which was completed in 1573. By the time Jahan ascended to the throne, Agra's population had grown to approximately 700,000 and was, as Abdul Aziz wrote, "a wonder of the age – as much a centre of the arteries of trade both by land and water as a meeting-place of saints, sages and scholars from all Asia.....a veritable lodestar for artistic workmanship, literary talent and spiritual worth".

Agra became a city centered on its waterfront and developed partly eastwards but mostly westwards from the rich estates that lined the banks. The prime sites remained those that had access to the river and the Taj Mahal was built in this context, but uniquely; as a related complex on both banks of the river.

=== Interactive plan ===
Click image to navigate

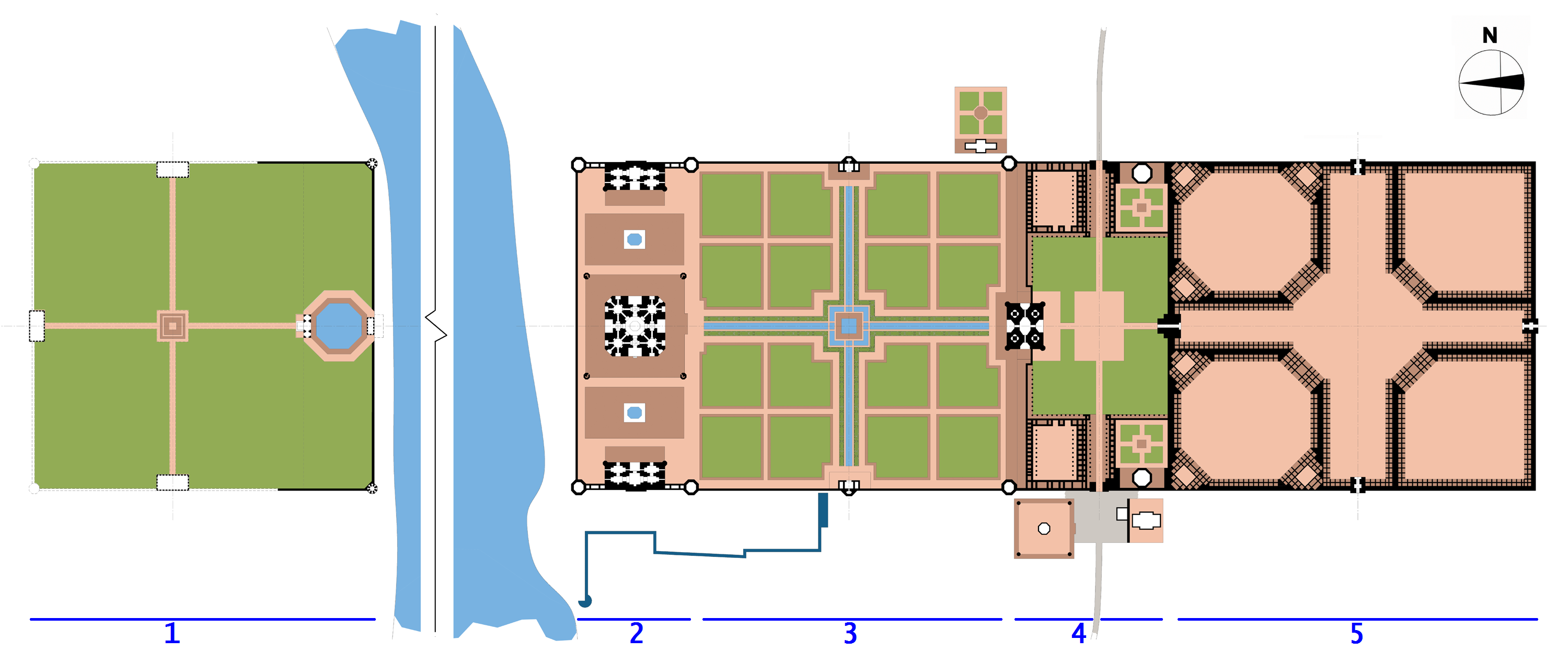

The Taj Mahal complex can be conveniently divided into five sections:

1. The 'moonlight garden' (Mehtab Bagh) to the north of the river Yamuna.
2. The riverfront terrace, containing the Mausoleum, Mosque and Guest House.
3. The Charbagh Garden containing pavilions.
4. The Naubat Khana (Drum House) at the western and eastern sides of the Garden. The western Naubat Khana is converted into a museum.
5. The jilaukhana (forecourt) containing accommodation for the tomb attendants and two subsidiary tombs.
6. The Taj Ganji, originally a bazaar and caravanserai only traces of which are still preserved. The great gate lies between the jilaukhana and the garden.

Levels gradually descend in steps from the Taj Ganji towards the river. Contemporary descriptions of the complex list the elements in order from the river terrace towards the Taj Ganji.

== Precedents ==
=== Mughal tombs ===
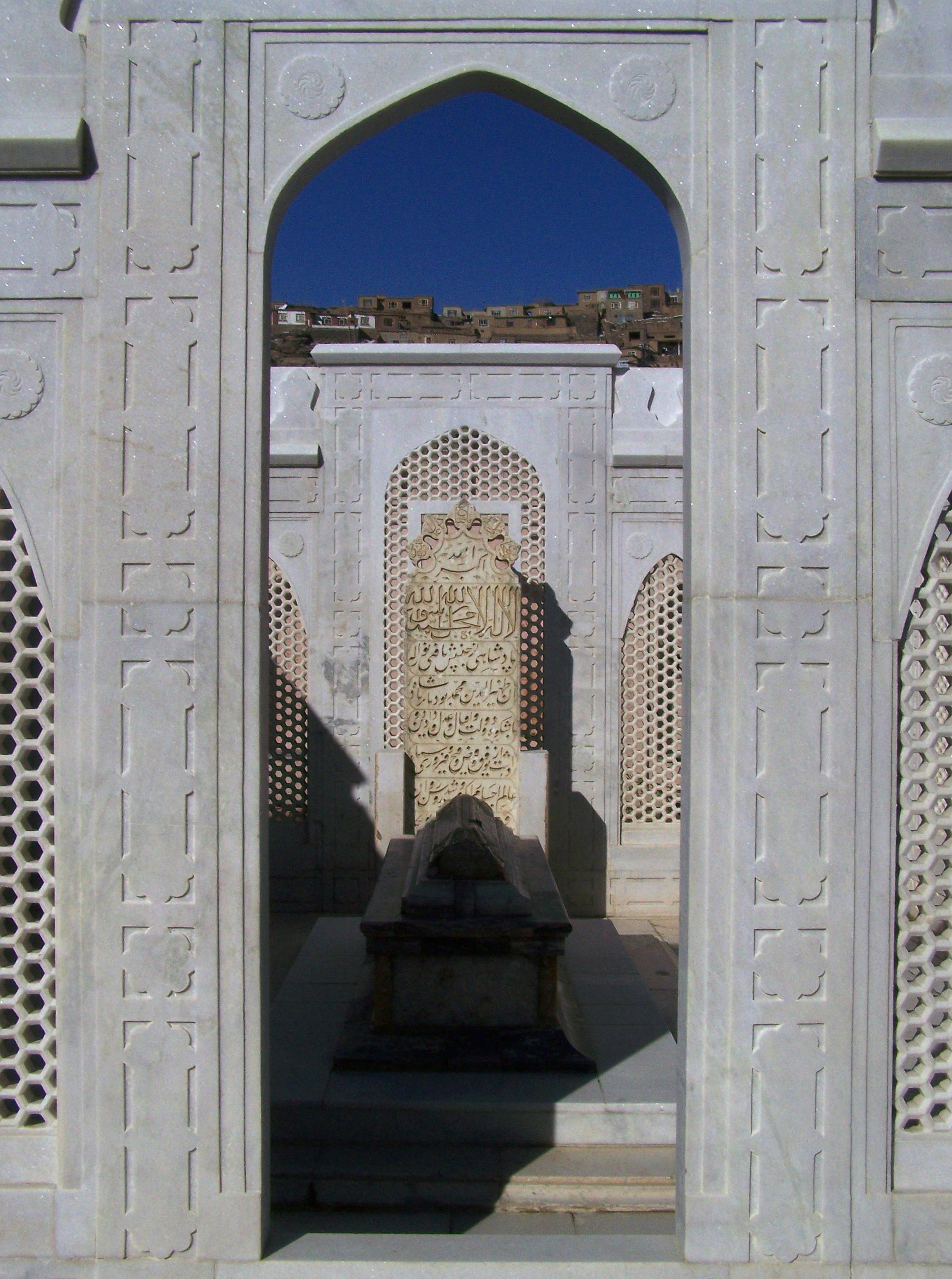
The simple Tomb of Babur in Kabul, Afghanistan, open to the sky.

The erection of Mughal tombs to honour the dead was the subject of a theological debate conducted in part, through built architecture over several centuries. For the majority of Muslims, the spiritual power (barakat) of visiting the resting places (ziyarat) of those venerated in Islam, was a force by which greater personal sanctity could be achieved. However, orthodox Islam found tombs problematic because a number of Hadith forbade their construction. As a culture also attempting to accommodate, assimilate and subjugate the majority Hindu populace, opposition also came from local traditions which believed dead bodies and the structures over them were impure. For many Muslims at the time of the Taj's construction, tombs could be considered legitimate providing they did not strive for pomp and were seen as a means to provide a reflection of paradise (Jannah) here on earth.

The ebb and flow of this debate can be seen in the Mughul's dynastic mausoleums stretching back to that of their ancestor Timur. Built in 1403 AD (810 AH) Timur is buried in the Gur-e Amir in Samarkand, under a fluted dome. The tomb employs a traditional Persian iwan as an entrance. The 1528 AD (935 AH) Tomb of Babur in Kabul is much more modest in comparison, with a simple cenotaph exposed to the sky, laid out in the centre of a walled garden.

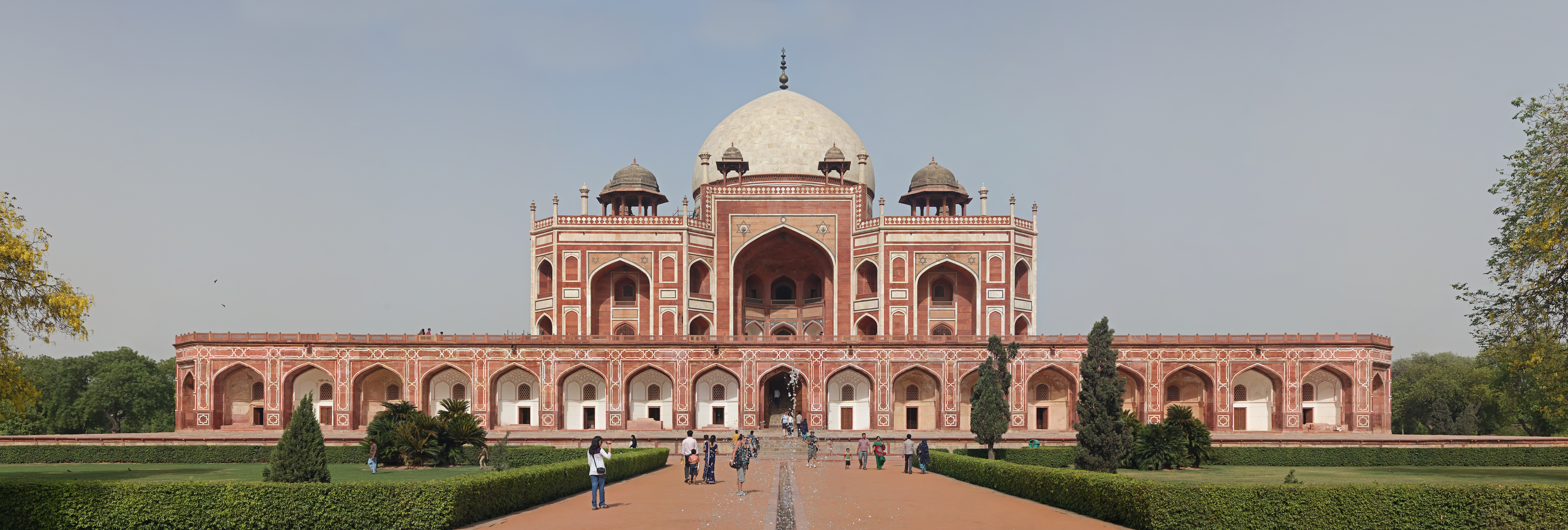
Humayun's tomb surmounted by a dome

Humayun's tomb commissioned in 1562 AD, was one of the most direct influences on the Taj Mahal's design and was a response to the Gur-e Amir, borrowing a central dome, geometric symmetrical planning and iwan entrances, but incorporating the more specifically Indian Mughal devices of chhatris, red sandstone face work, and a 'Paradise garden' (Charbagh). Akbar's tomb c.1600 at Sikandra, Agra, retains many of the elements of Humayan's tomb but possesses no dome and reverts to a cenotaph open to the sky. A theme which was carried forward in the Itmad-Ud-Daulah's Tomb also at Agra, built between 1622 and 1628, commissioned by his daughter Nur Jahan. The Tomb of Jahangir at Shahdara (Lahore), begun in 1628 AD (1037 AH), only 4 years before the construction of the Taj and again without a dome, takes the form of a simple plinth with a minaret at each corner.

=== Paradise gardens ===
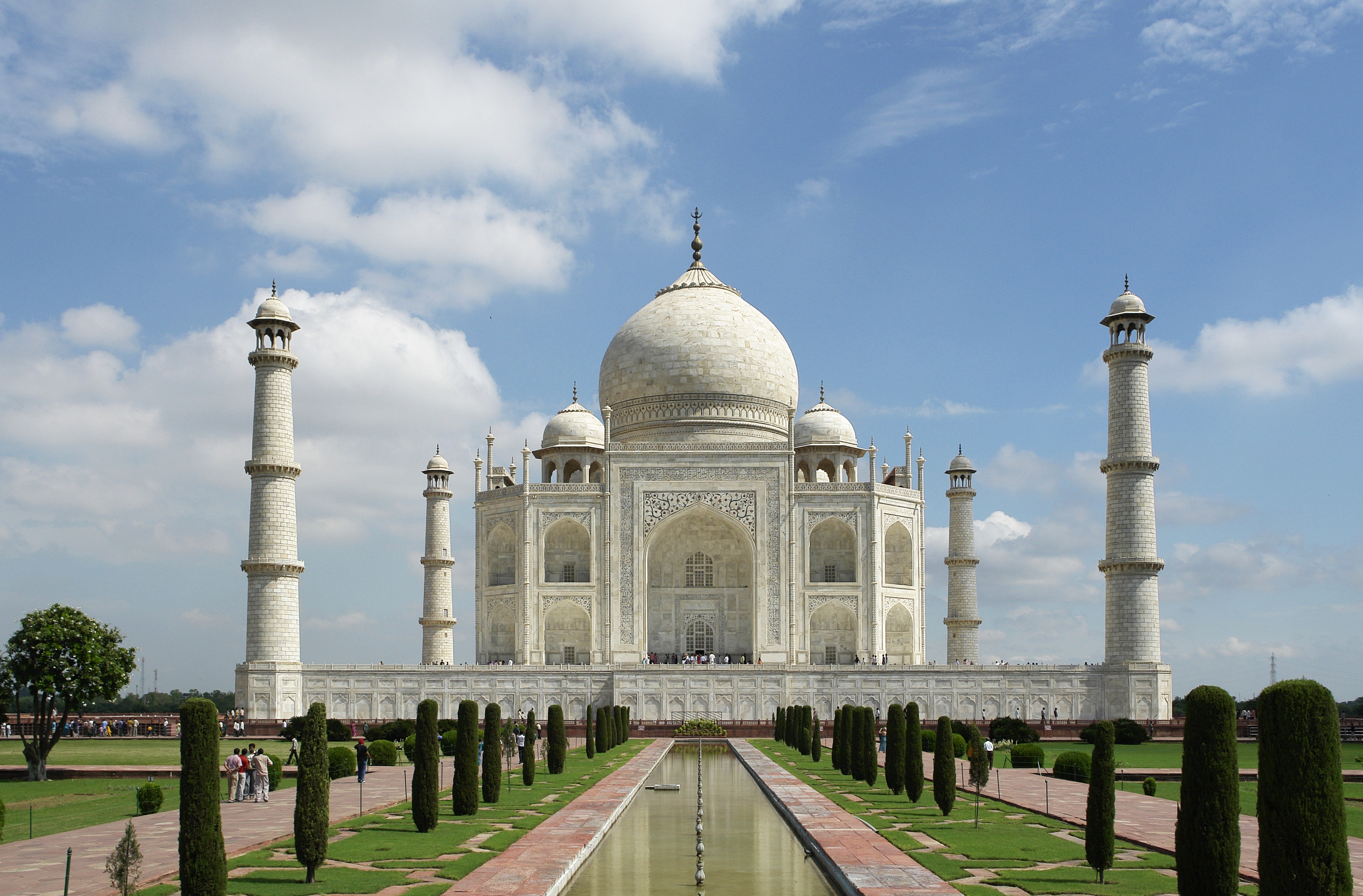
The large charbagh (a form of Persian garden divided into four parts) provides the foreground for the classic view of the Taj Mahal, UNESCO World Heritage Site

The concept of the paradise garden (charbagh) was brought from Persia by the Mughals as a form of Timurid garden. They were the first architectural expression the new empire made in the Indian sub-continent, and fulfilled diverse functions with strong symbolic meanings. The symbolism of these gardens is derived from mystic Islamic texts describing paradise as a garden filled with abundant trees, flowers and plants, with water playing a key role: In Paradise four rivers source at a central spring or mountain. In their ideal form they were laid out as a square subdivided into four equal parts. These rivers are often represented in the charbagh as shallow canals which separate the garden by flowing towards the cardinal points. The canals represent the promise of water, milk, wine and honey. The centre of the garden, at the intersection of the divisions is highly symbolically charged and is where, in the ideal form, a pavilion, pool or tomb would be situated. The tombs of Humayun, Akbar and Jahangir, the previous Mughal emperors, follow this pattern. The cross axial garden also finds independent precedents within South Asia dating from the 5th century where the royal gardens of Sigiriya in Sri Lanka were laid out in a similar way.

For the tomb of Jahan's late wife though, where the mausoleum is sited at the edge of the garden, there is a debate amongst scholars regarding why the traditional charbagh form has not been used. Ebba Koch suggests a variant of the charbagh was employed; that of the more secular waterfront garden found in Agra, adapted for a religious purpose. Such gardens were developed by the Mughuls for the specific conditions of the Indian plains where slow flowing rivers provide the water source, the water is raised from the river by animal-driven devices known as purs and stored in cisterns. A linear terrace is set close to the riverbank with low-level rooms set below the main building opening on to the river. Both ends of the terrace were emphasised with towers. This form was brought to Agra by Babur and by the time of Shah Jahan, gardens of this type, as well as the more traditional charbagh, lined both sides of the Jumna river. The riverside terrace was designed to enhance the views of Agra for the imperial elite who would travel in and around the city by river. Other scholars suggest another explanation for the eccentric siting of the mausoleum. If the Midnight Garden to the north of the river Jumna is considered an integral part of the complex, then the mausoleum can be interpreted as being in the centre of a garden divided by a real river and thus can be considered more in the tradition of the pure charbagh.

=== Mausolea ===
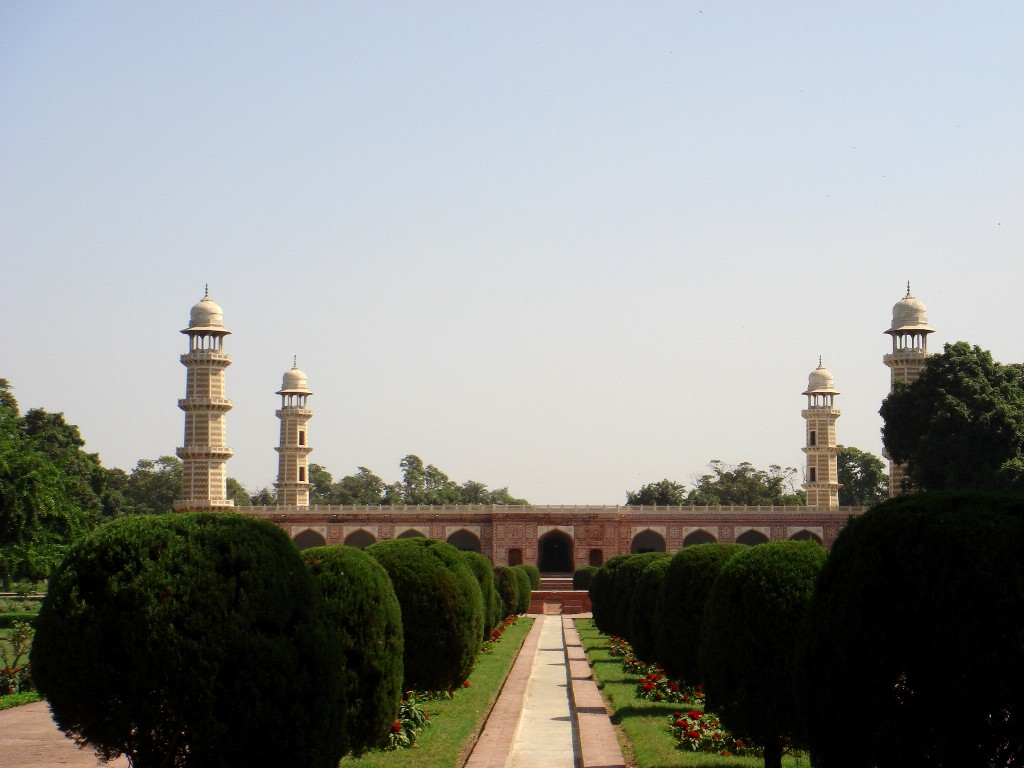
Tomb of Jahangir with minarets in Lahore, Pakistan

The favoured form of both Mughal garden pavilions and mausolea (seen as a funerary form of pavilion) was the hasht bihisht which translates from Persian as 'eight paradises'. These were a square or rectangular planned buildings with a central domed chamber surrounded by eight elements. Later developments of the hasht bihisht divided the square at 45-degree angles to create a more radial plan which often also includes chamfered corners; examples of which can be found in Todar Mal's Baradari at Fatehpur Sikri and Humayun's Tomb. Each element of the plan is reflected in the elevations with iwans and with the corner rooms expressed through smaller arched niches. Often such structures are topped with chhatris (small pillared pavilions) at each corner. The eight divisions and frequent octagonal forms of such structures represent the eight levels of paradise for Muslims. The paradigm however was not confined solely to Islamic antecedents. The Chinese magic square was employed for numerous purposes including crop rotation and also finds a Muslim expression in the wafq of their mathematicians. Ninefold schemes find particular resonance in the Indian mandalas, the cosmic maps of Hinduism and Buddhism.

In addition to Humayun's tomb, the more closely contemporary Tomb of Itmad-Ud-Daulah marked a new era of Mughal architecture. It was built by the empress Nur Jehan for her father from 1622 to 1625 AD (1031–1034 AH) and is small in comparison to many other Mughal-era tombs. So exquisite is the execution of its surface treatments, it is often described as a jewel box. The garden layout, hierarchical use of white marble and sandstone, Parchin kari inlay designs and latticework presage many elements of the Taj Mahal. The cenotaph of Nur Jehan's father is laid, off centre, to the west of her mother. This break in symmetry was repeated in the Taj where Mumtaz was interred in the geometric centre of the complex and Jahan is laid to her side. These close similarities with the tomb of Mumtaz have earned it the sobriquet – The Baby Taj.

=== Minarets ===
Minarets did not become a common feature of Mughal architecture until the 17th century, particularly under the patronage of Shah Jahan. A few precedents exist in the 20 years before the construction of the Taj in the Tomb of Akbar and the Tomb of Jahangir. Their increasing use was influenced by developments elsewhere in the Islamic world, particularly in Ottoman and Timurid architecture and is seen as suggestive of an increasing religious orthodoxy of the Mughal dynasty.

== Concepts, symbolism and interpretations ==
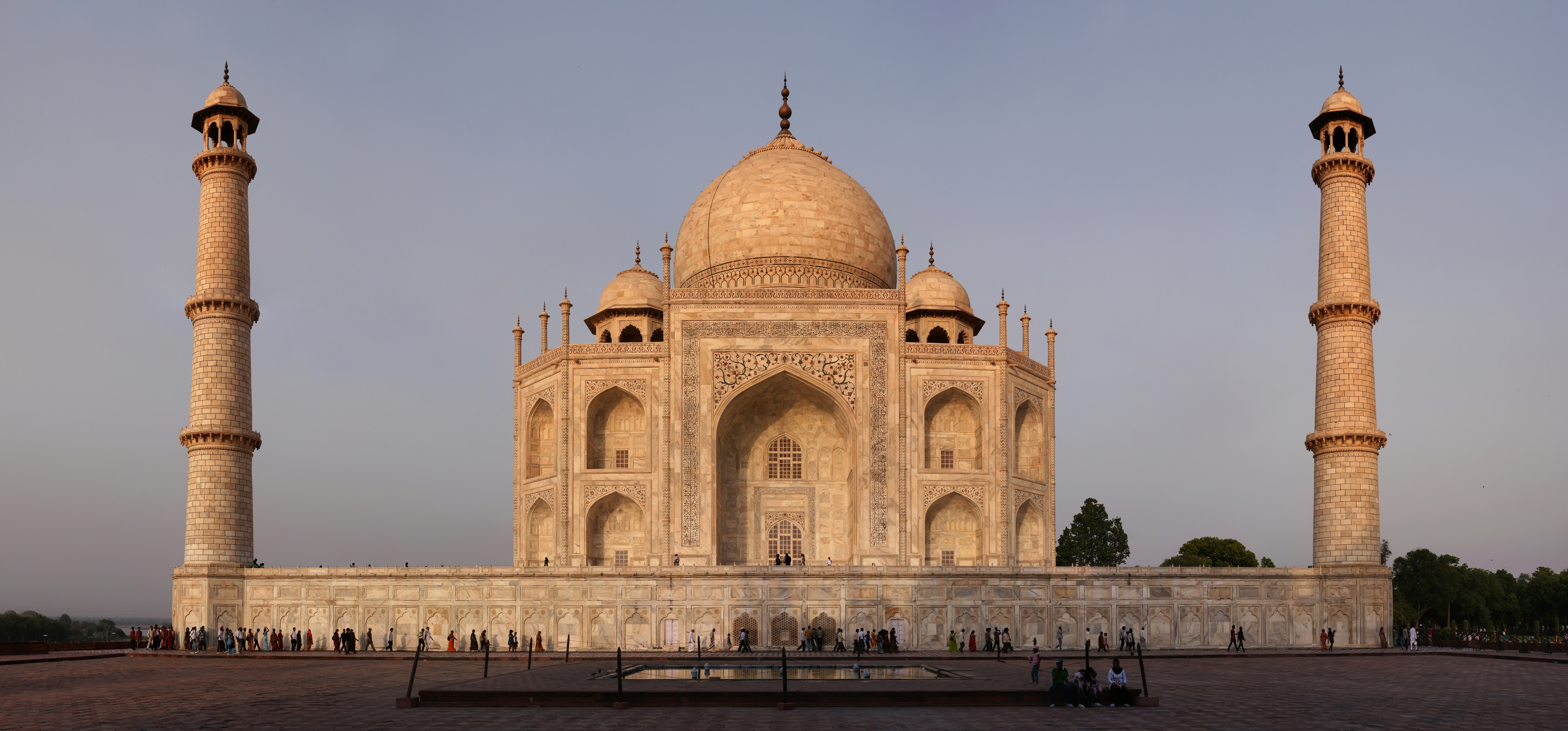
The mausoleum at sunset. Light is a Mughal metaphor for God.

Under the reign of Shah Jahan, the symbolic content of Mughal architecture reached a peak. The Taj Mahal complex was conceived as a replica on earth of the house of the departed in paradise (inspired by a verse by the imperial goldsmith and poet, Bibadal Khan). (Note: "May the abode of Mumtaz Mahal be paradise".) This theme, common in most Mughal funerary architecture, permeates the entire complex and informs the detailed design of all the elements. A number of secondary principles also inform the design, of which hierarchy is the most dominant. A deliberate interplay is established between the building's elements, its surface decoration, materials, geometric planning and its acoustics. This interplay extends from what can be experienced directly with the senses, into religious, intellectual, mathematical and poetic ideas. The constantly changing sunlight reflected from the Taj's translucent marble is not a happy accident, it had a deliberate metaphoric role associated with the presence of god as light.

=== Symmetry and hierarchy ===
Symmetry and geometric planning played an important role in ordering the complex and reflected a trend towards formal systematisation that was apparent in all of the arts emanating from Jahan's imperial patronage. Bilateral symmetry expressed simultaneous ideas of pairing, counterparts and integration, reflecting intellectual and spiritual notions of universal harmony. A complex set of implied grids based on the Mughul Gaz unit of measurement provided a flexible means of bringing proportional order to all the elements of the Taj Mahal.

Hierarchical ordering of architecture is commonly used to emphasise particular elements of a design and to create drama. In the Taj Mahal, the hierarchical use of red sandstone and white marble contributes manifold symbolic significance. The Mughals were elaborating on a concept which traced its roots to earlier Hindu practices, set out in the Vishnudharmottara Purana, which recommended white stone for buildings for the Brahmins (priestly caste) and red stone for members of the Kshatriyas (warrior caste). By building structures that employed such colour-coding, the Mughals identified themselves with the two leading classes of Indian social structure and thus defined themselves as rulers in Indian terms. Red sandstone also had significance in the Persian origins of the Mughal empire where red was the exclusive colour of imperial tents. In the Taj Mahal the relative importance of each building in the complex is denoted by the amount of white marble (or sometimes white polished plaster) that is used.

The use of naturalist ornament demonstrates a similar hierarchy. Wholly absent from the more lowly jilaukhana and caravanserai areas, it can be found with increasing frequency as the processional route approaches the climactic Mausoleum. Its symbolism is multifaceted, on the one hand evoking a more perfect, stylised and permanent garden of paradise than could be found growing in the earthly garden; on the other, an instrument of propaganda for Jahan's chroniclers who portrayed him as an 'erect cypress of the garden of the caliphate' and frequently used plant metaphors to praise his good governance, person, family and court. Plant metaphors also find common cause with Hindu traditions where such symbols as the 'vase of plenty' (Kalasha) can be found.

Sound was also used to express ideas of paradise. The interior of the mausoleum has a reverberation time (the time taken from when a noise is made until all of its echoes have died away) of 28 seconds. This provided an atmosphere where the words of those employed to continually recite the Qu'ran (the Hafiz), in tribute and prayer for the soul of Mumtaz, would linger in the air.

=== Throne of God ===
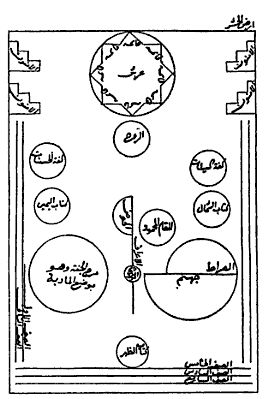
Diagram of "Plain of Assembly" (Ard al-Hashr) on the Day of Judgment, from autograph manuscript of Futuhat al-Makkiyya by Sufi mystic and philosopher Ibn Arabi, ca. 1238.

Wayne E. Begley put forward an interpretation in 1979 that exploits the Islamic idea that the 'Garden of paradise' is also the location of the Throne of God on the Day of Judgement. In his reading the Taj Mahal is seen as a monument where Shah Jahan has appropriated the authority of the 'throne of god' symbolism for the glorification of his own reign. Koch disagrees, finding this an overly elaborate explanation and pointing out that the 'Throne' verse from the Qu'ran (sura 2, verse 255) is missing from the calligraphic inscriptions.

In 1996 Begley stated that it is likely that the diagram of "Plain of Assembly" (Ard al-Hashr) on the Day of Judgment by Sufi mystic and philosopher Ibn Arabi (ca. 1238) was a source of inspiration for the layout of the Taj Mahal garden. Ibn Arabi was held in high regard at the time and many copies of the Futuhat al-Makkiyya, that contains the diagram, were available in India. The diagram shows the 'Arsh (Throne of God; the circle with the eight pointed star), pulpits for the righteous (al-Aminun), seven rows of angels, Gabriel (al-Ruh), A'raf (the Barrier), the Hauzu'l-Kausar (Fountain of Abundance; the semi-circle in the center), al-Maqam al-Mahmud (the Praiseworthy Station; where Muhammad will stand to intercede for the faithful), Mizan (the Scale), As-Sirāt (the Bridge), Jahannam (Hell) and Marj al-Jannah (Meadow of Paradise). The general proportions and the placement of the Throne, the pulpits and the Kausar Fountain show striking similarities with the Taj Mahal and its garden.

=== Symbol of love ===
The popular view of the Taj Mahal as one of the world's monuments to a great "love story" is borne out by the contemporary accounts and most scholars accept this has a strong basis in fact. The building was also used to assert Jahani propaganda concerning the 'perfection' of the Mughal leadership. The extent to which the Taj uses propaganda is the subject of some debate amongst contemporary scholars. This period of Mughal architecture best exemplifies the maturity of a style that had synthesised Islamic architecture with its indigenous counterparts. By the time the Mughals built the Taj, though proud of their Persian and Timurid roots, they had come to see themselves as Indian. Copplestone writes "Although it is certainly a native Indian production, its architectural success rests on its fundamentally Persian sense of intelligible and undisturbed proportions, applied to clean uncomplicated surfaces."

== Construction and interment ==
Location of the Taj Mahal at Agra, Burhanpur where Mumtaz died and the locations where some of the building materials were sourced

A site was chosen on the banks of the Yamuna River on the southern edge of Agra and purchased from Raja Jai Singh (Note: The grandson of Raja Man Singh of Amber and a relative of Shah Jahan through his Great Uncle Raja Bhagwant Das.) in exchange for four mansions in the city. The site, "from the point of view of loftiness and pleasantness appeared to be worthy of the burial of that one who dwells in paradise". In January 1632 AD (1041 AH), Mumtaz's body was moved with great ceremony from Burhanpur to Agra while food, drink and coins were distributed amongst the poor and deserving along the way. Work had already begun on the foundations of the river terrace when the body arrived. A small domed building was erected over her body, thought to have been sited, and now marked, by an enclosure in the western garden near the riverfront terrace.

=== Foundations ===
The foundations represented the biggest technical challenge to be overcome by the Mughal builders. In order to support the considerable load resulting from the mausoleum, the sands of the riverbank needed to be stabilised. To this end, wells were sunk and then cased in timber and finally filled with rubble, iron and mortar – essentially acting as augured piles. After construction of the terrace was completed, work began simultaneously on the rest of the complex. Trees were planted almost immediately to allow them to mature as work progressed.

=== Dating ===
The initial stages of the build were noted by Shah Jahan's chroniclers in their description of the first two anniversary celebrations in honour of Mumtaz – known as the 'Urs. The first, held on 5 June 1632 AD (1041 AH), was a tented affair open to all ranks of society and held in the location of what is now the entrance courtyard (jilaukhana). Alms were distributed and prayers recited. By the second Urs, held on 25 May 1633 AD (1042 AH), (Note: The Islamic Calendar is lunar and so the anniversary dates vary when expressed in the Gregorian Calendar.) Mumtaz Mahal had been interred in her final resting place, the riverside terrace was finished; as was the plinth of the mausoleum and the tahkhana, a galleried suite of rooms opening to the river and under the terrace. It was used by the imperial retinue for the celebrations. Peter Mundy, an employee of the British East India company and a western eye witness, noted the ongoing construction of the caravanserais and bazaars and that "There is alreadye[sic] about Her Tombe a raile[sic] of gold". To deter theft it was replaced in 1643 AD (1053 AH) with an inlaid marble jali.

After the second Urs further dating of the progress can be made from several signatures left by the calligrapher Amanat Khan. The signed frame of the south arch of the domed hall of the mausoleum indicates it was reaching completion in 1638/39 AD (1048/1049 AH). In 1643 AD (1053 AH) the official sources documenting the twelfth Urs give a detailed description of a substantially completed complex. Decorative work apparently continued until 1648 AD (1058 AH) when Amanat Khan dated the north arch of the great gate with the inscription "Finished with His help, the Most High".

=== Materials ===
The Taj Mahal was constructed using materials from all over India and Asia. The buildings are constructed with walls of brick and rubble inner cores faced with either marble or sandstone locked together with iron dowels and clamps. Some of the walls of the mausoleum are several metres thick. Over 1,000 elephants were used to transport the building materials during the construction. The bricks were fired locally and the sandstone was quarried 28 miles (45 km) away near Fatehpur Sikri. The white marble was brought 250 miles (400 km) from quarries belonging to Raja Jai Singh in Makrana, Rajasthan. The Jasper was sourced from the Punjab and the Jade and crystal from China. The turquoise was from Tibet and the Lapis lazuli from Afghanistan, while the sapphire came from Sri Lanka and the carnelian from Arabia. In all, 28 types of precious and semi-precious stones were inlaid into the white marble. Jean-Baptiste Tavernier records that the scaffolding and centering for the arches was constructed entirely in brick. Legend says that the emperor offered these scaffolding bricks to anyone who would remove them and that at the end of the construction they were removed within a week. Modern scholars dispute this and consider it much more likely that the scaffolding was made of bamboo and materials were elevated by means of timber ramps.

=== Cost ===
Initial estimates for the cost of the works of 4,000,000 rupees had risen to 5,000,000 by completion. (Note: In 1637–39 AD (1047–1049 AH), an Indian servant of the Dutch East India company could expect to receive 36 Rupees annually, a mansabdar would receive 9000 Rupees a year.) A waqf (trust) was established for the perpetual upkeep of the mausoleum with an income of 300,000 Rupees. One third of this income came from 30 villages in the district of Agra while the remainder came from taxes generated as a result of trade from the bazaars and caravanserais which had been built at an early stage to the south of the complex. Any surplus would be distributed by the emperor as he saw fit. As well as paying for routine maintenance, the waqf financed the expenses for the tomb attendants and the Hafiz, the Quran reciters who would sit day and night in the mausoleum and perform funerary services praying for the eternal soul of Mumtaz Mahal.

== Architects and craftsmen ==
We do not know precisely who designed the Taj Mahal. In the Islamic world at the time, the credit for a building's design was usually given to its patron rather than its architects. From the evidence of contemporary sources, it is clear that a team of architects were responsible for the design and supervision of the works, but they are mentioned infrequently. Shah Jahan's court histories emphasise his personal involvement in the construction and it is true that, more than any other Mughal emperor, he showed the greatest interest in building, holding daily meetings with his architects and supervisors. The court chronicler Lahouri, writes that Jahan would make "appropriate alterations to whatever the skillful architects designed after many thoughts, and asked competent questions." Two architects are mentioned by name, Ustad Ahmad Lahauri and Mir Abd-ul Karim in writings by Lahauri's son Lutfullah Muhandis. Ustad Ahmad Lahauri had laid the foundations of the Red Fort at Delhi. Mir Abd-ul Karim had been the favourite architect of the previous emperor Jahangir and is mentioned as a supervisor, (Note: There is some disagreement as to whether the translation of darogha imarat is 'Superintendent of Buildings' as Begley and Koch contend or 'Chief architect' as Qaisar contends.) together with Makramat Khan, of the construction of the Taj Mahal.

- Bebadal Khan, the poet and goldsmith

=== Calligraphy and decoration ===
In the complex, passages from the Qur'an are used as decorative elements. Recent scholarship suggests that the passages were chosen by a Persian calligrapher `Abd ul-Haq, who came to India from Shiraz, Iran, in 1609. As a reward for his "dazzling virtuosity", Shah Jahan gave him the title of "Amanat Khan". This is supported by an inscription near the lines from the Qur'an at the base of the interior dome that reads "Written by the insignificant being, Amanat Khan Shirazi."

Passages from the Qur'an referring to themes of judgment:
Surah 36 – Ya Sin	Surah 39 – Az-Zumar The Crowds	Surah 48 – Al-Fath Victory
Surah 67 – Al-Mulk Dominion	Surah 77 – Al-Mursalat Those Sent Forth	Surah 81 – At-Takwir The Folding Up
Surah 82 – Al-Infitar The Cleaving Asunder	Surah 84 – Al-Inshiqaq The Rending Asunder	Surah 89 – Al-Fajr Daybreak
Surah 91 – Ash-Shams The Sun	Surah 93 – Ad-Dhuha Morning Light	Surah 94 – Al-Inshirah The Solace
Surah 95 – At-Teen The Fig	Surah 98 – Al-Bayyinah The Evidence	Surah 112 – Al-Ikhlas The Purity of Faith

The calligraphy on the Great Gate reads "O Soul, thou art at rest. Return to the Lord at peace with Him, and He at peace with you."

Much of the calligraphy is composed of florid thuluth script, made of jasper or black marble, inlaid in white marble panels. Higher panels are written in slightly larger script to reduce the skewing effect when viewed from below. The calligraphy found on the marble cenotaphs in the tomb is particularly detailed and delicate.

Abstract forms are used throughout, especially in the plinth, minarets, gateway, mosque, jawab and to a lesser extent, on the surfaces of the tomb. The domes and vaults of the sandstone buildings are worked with tracery of incised painting to create elaborate geometric forms. Herringbone inlays define the space between many of the adjoining elements. White inlays are used in sandstone buildings, and dark or black inlays on the white marbles. Mortared areas of the marble buildings have been stained or painted in a contrasting colour, creating geometric patterns of considerable complexity. Floors and walkways use contrasting tiles or blocks in tessellation patterns.

On the lower walls of the tomb there are white marble dados that have been sculpted with realistic bas relief depictions of flowers and vines. The marble has been polished to emphasise the exquisite detailing of the carvings and the dado frames and archway spandrels have been decorated with pietra dura inlays of highly stylised, almost geometric vines, flowers and fruits. The inlay stones are of yellow marble, jasper and jade, polished and leveled to the surface of the walls.

== Dimensional organisation ==
The Taj complex is ordered by grids. The complex was originally surveyed by J.A. Hodgson in 1825, however the first detailed scholastic examination of how the various elements of the Taj might fit into a coordinating grid was not carried out until 1989 by Begley and Desai. Numerous 17th-century accounts detail the precise measurements of the complex in terms of the gaz or zira, the Mughal linear yard, equivalent to approximately 80–92 cm. Begley and Desai concluded a 400-gaz grid was used and then subdivided and that the various discrepancies they discovered were due to errors in the contemporary descriptions.

Research and measurement by Koch and Richard André Barraud in 2006 suggested a more complex method of ordering that relates better to the 17th century records. Whereas Begley and Desai had used a simple fixed grid on which the buildings are superimposed, Koch and Barraud found the layout's proportions were better explained by the use of a generated grid system in which specific lengths may be divided in a number of ways such as halving, dividing by three or using decimal systems. They suggest the 374-gaz width of the complex given by the contemporary historians was correct and the Taj is planned as a tripartite rectangle of three 374-gaz squares. Different modular divisions are then used to proportion the rest of the complex. A 17-gaz module is used in the jilaukhana, bazaar and caravanserais areas whereas a more detailed 23-gaz module is used in the garden and terrace areas (since their width is 368 gaz, a multiple of 23). The buildings were in turn proportioned using yet smaller grids superimposed on the larger organisational ones. The smaller grids were also used to establish elevational proportion throughout the complex.

Koch and Barraud explain such apparently peculiar numbers as making more sense when seen as part of Mughal geometric understanding. Octagons and triangles, which feature extensively in the Taj, have particular properties in terms of the relationships of their sides. A right-angled triangle with two sides of 12 will have a hypotenuse of approximately 17 (16.97+); similarly if it has two sides of 17 its hypotenuse will be approximately 24 (24.04+). An octagon with a width of 17 will have sides of approximately 7 (7.04+), which is the basic grid upon which the mausoleum, mosque and Mihman Khana are planned.

Discrepancies remain in Koch and Barraud's work which they attribute to numbers being rounded fractions, inaccuracies of reporting from third persons and errors in workmanship (most notable in the caravanserais areas further from the tomb itself).

Element	Metres			Gaz		
Element	length / width / diameter	breadth / depth / side	height	length / width / diameter	breadth / depth / side	height
Overall complex	896.1	300.84		1112.5	374	
Overall preserved complex	561.2	300.84		696	374	
Taj Ganji	334.9	300.84		416.5	374	
Jilaukhana	165.1–165.23	123.51		204	153	
Great gate	41.2	34	23.07	51	42	28.5
Charbagh	296.31	296.31		368	368	
Riverfront terrace	300	111.89	8.7	373	138	
Mausoleum	56.9	56.9	67.97	70	70	84
Minaret	5.65		43.02	7		53.5
Mosque	56.6	23.38	20.3	70	29	25–29
All dimensions from Koch, pp. 258–259 credited to Richard André Barraud

A 2009 paper by Prof R. Balasubramaniam of the Indian Institute of Technology found Barraud's explanation of the dimensional errors and the transition between the 23 and 17 gaz grid at the great gate unconvincing. Balasubramaniam conducted dimensional analysis of the complex based on Barraud's surveys. He concluded that the Taj was constructed using the ancient Aṅgula as the basic unit rather than the Mughal 'gaz', noted in the contemporary accounts. The Aṅgula, which equates to 1.763 cm and the Vistasti (12 Angulams) were first mentioned in the Arthashastra in c. 300 BC and may have been derived from the earlier Indus Valley Civilisation. In this analysis the forecourt and caravanserai areas were set out with a 60 Vistasti grid, and the riverfront and garden sections with a 90-vistari grid. The transition between the grids is more easily accommodated, 90 being easily divisible by 60. The research suggests that older, pre-Mughal methods of proportion were employed as ordering principles in the Taj.

== Components of the complex ==
=== Mausoleum (Rauza-i munauwara) ===
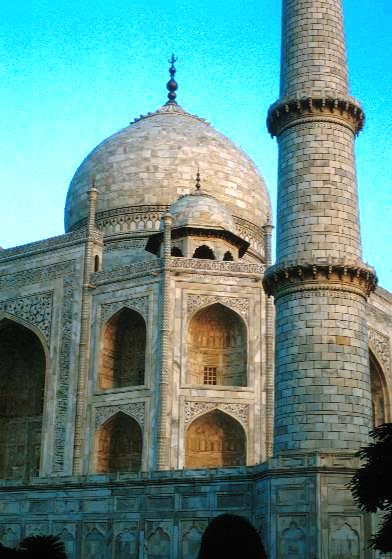
Base, dome, and minaret

The focus and climax of the Taj Mahal complex is the symmetrical white marble tomb; a cubic building with chamfered corners, with arched recesses known as pishtaqs. It is topped by a large dome and several pillared, roofed chhatris. In plan, it has a near perfect symmetry about 4 axes. It comprises 4 floors; the lower basement storey containing the tombs of Jahan and Mumtaz, the entrance storey containing identical cenotaphs of the tombs below in a much more elaborate chamber, an ambulatory storey and a roof terrace.

Elevations

The mausoleum is cubic with chamfered edges. On the long sides, a massive pishtaq, or vaulted archway frames an arch-shaped doorway, with a similar arch-shaped balcony above. These main arches extend above the roof the building by use of an integrated facade. To either side of the main arch, additional pishtaqs are stacked above and below. This motif of stacked pishtaqs is replicated on the chamfered corner areas. The design is completely uniform and consistent on all sides of the building.

Dome

The marble dome that surmounts the tomb is its most spectacular feature. Its height is about the same size as the base building, about 35 m. Its height is accentuated because it sits on a cylindrical "drum" about 7 metres high. Because of its shape, the dome is often called an onion dome (also called an amrud or apple dome). The dome is topped by a gilded finial. The dome shape is emphasised by four smaller domed chhatris placed at its corners. The chhatri domes replicate the onion shape of main dome. Their columned bases open through the roof of the tomb, and provide light to the interior. The chhatris also are topped by gilded finials. Tall decorative spires (guldastas) extend from the edges of the base walls, and provide visual emphasis of the dome height.

Lower chamber

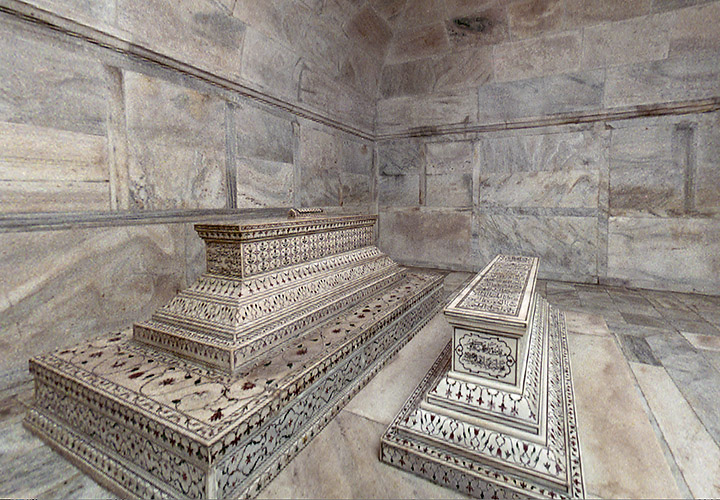
The tombs of Shah Jahan (left) and Mumtaz Mahal (right) in the lower chamber

Muslim tradition forbids elaborate decoration of graves, so the bodies of Mumtaz and Shah Jahan are laid in a relatively plain, marble faced chamber, beneath the main chamber of the Taj. They are buried in graves on a north-south axis, with faces turned right (west) toward Mecca. Two cenotaphs above mark the graves. Mumtaz's cenotaph is placed at the precise center of the inner chamber. On a rectangular marble base about 1.5 by 2.5 metres is a smaller marble casket. Both base and casket are elaborately inlaid with precious and semiprecious gems. Calligraphic inscriptions on top of the casket recite verses from the Koran and on the sides express the Ninety-Nine beautiful names of Allah.

Main chamber

The inner chamber of the Taj Mahal contains the cenotaphs of Mumtaz and Shah Jahan. It is a masterpiece of artistic craftsmanship, virtually without precedent or equal. The inner chamber is an octagon. While the design allows for entry from each face, only the south (garden facing) door is used. The interior walls are about 25 metres high, topped by a "false" interior dome decorated with a sun motif. Eight pishtaq arches define the space at ground level. As is typical with the exterior, each lower pishtaq is crowned by a second pishtaq about midway up the wall. The four central upper arches form balconies or viewing areas; each balcony's exterior window has an intricate screen or jali cut from marble. In addition to the light from the balcony screens, light enters through roof openings covered by the chhatris at the corners of the exterior dome. Each of the chamber walls has been highly decorated with dado bas relief, intricate lapidary inlay, and refined calligraphy panels.

The hierarchical ordering of the entire complex reaches its crescendo in the chamber. Mumtaz's cenotaph sits at the geometric centre of the building; Jahan was buried at a later date by her side to the west – an arrangement seen in other Mughal tombs of the period such as Itmad-Ud-Daulah. Marble is used exclusively as the base material for increasingly dense, expensive and complex parchin kari floral decoration as one approaches the screen and cenotaphs which are inlaid with semi-precious stones. The use of such inlay work is often reserved in Shah Jahani architecture for spaces associated with the emperor or his immediate family. The ordering of this decoration simultaneously emphasises the cardinal points and the centre of the chamber with dissipating concentric octagons. Such hierarchies appear in both Muslim and Indian culture as important spiritual and astrological themes. The chamber is an abundant evocation of the garden of paradise with representations of flowers, plants and arabesques and the calligraphic inscriptions in both the thuluth and the less formal naskh script,

Shah Jahan's cenotaph is beside Mumtaz's to the western side. It is the only asymmetric element in the entire complex. His cenotaph is bigger than his wife's, but reflects the same elements: A larger casket on slightly taller base, again decorated with astonishing precision with lapidary and calligraphy which identifies Shah Jahan. On the lid of this casket is a sculpture of a small pen box.

An octagonal marble screen or jali borders the cenotaphs and is made from eight marble panels. Each panel has been carved through with intricate piercework. The remaining surfaces have been inlaid with semiprecious stones in extremely delicate detail, forming twining vines, fruits and flowers.

=== Riverfront terrace (Chameli Farsh) ===
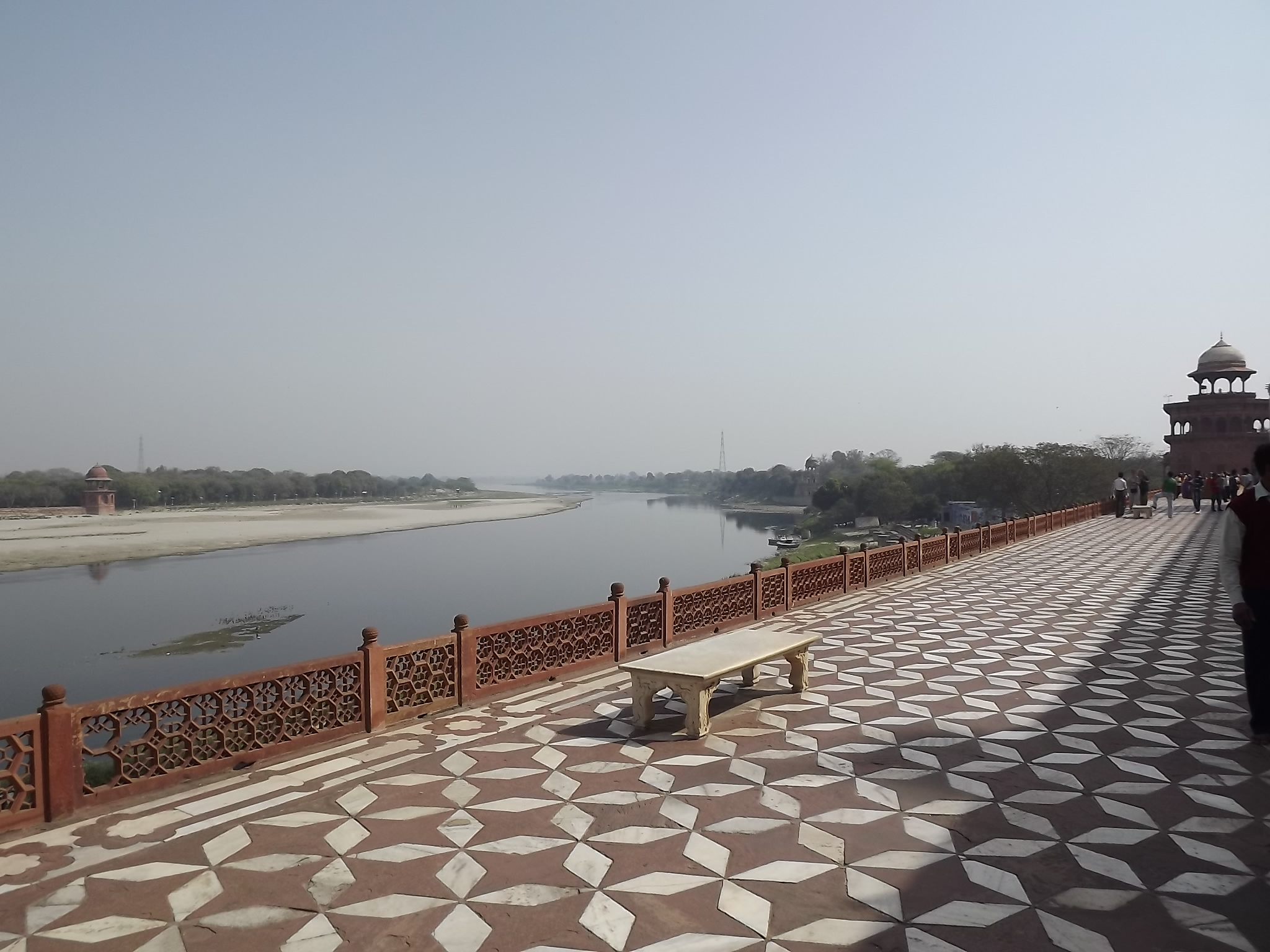
Riverfront terrace

Plinth and terrace

- Tahkhana
- Towers

Minarets

At the corners of the plinth stand minarets: four large towers each more than 40 metres tall. The towers are designed as working minarets, a traditional element of mosques, a place for a muezzin to call the Islamic faithful to prayer. Each minaret is effectively divided into three equal parts by two balconies that ring the tower. At the top of the tower is a final balcony surmounted by a chhatri that echoes the design of those on the tomb. The minaret chhatris share the same finishing touches: a lotus design topped by a gilded finial.

Guest House and Mosque

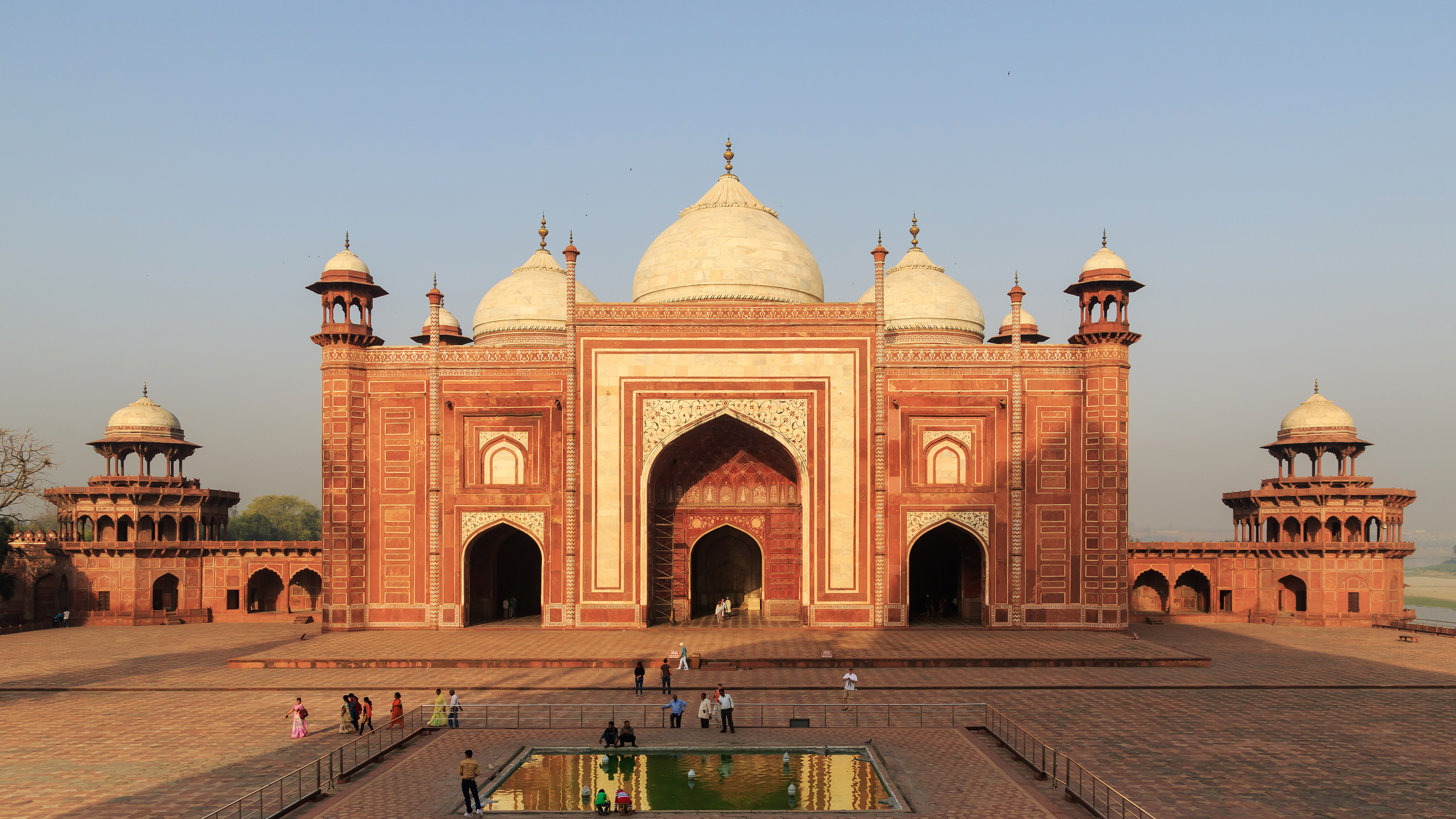
Mosque

The mausoleum is flanked by two almost identical buildings on either side of the platform. To the west is the Mosque, to the east is the Guest House. The Guest House (Jawab), meaning 'answer' balances the bilateral symmetry of the composition and was originally used as a place for entertaining and accommodation for important visitors. It differs from the mosque in that it lacks a mihrab, a niche in a mosque's wall facing Mecca, and the floors have a geometric design, while the mosque floor was laid out with the outlines of 569 prayer rugs in black marble.

The mosque's basic tripartite design is similar to others built by Shah Jahan, particularly the Masjid-i-Jahan Numa in Delhi – a long hall surmounted by three domes. Mughal mosques of this period divide the sanctuary hall into three areas: a main sanctuary with slightly smaller sanctuaries to either side. At the Taj Mahal, each sanctuary opens onto an enormous vaulting dome.

=== Garden (Charbagh) ===
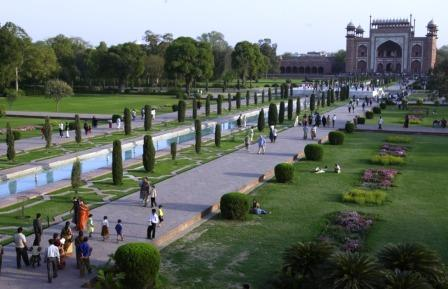
Walkways beside reflecting pool

The large charbagh (a form of Persian garden divided into four parts) provides the foreground for the classic view of the Taj Mahal. The garden's strict and formal planning employs raised pathways which divide each quarter of the garden into 16 sunken parterres or flowerbeds. A raised marble water tank at the center of the garden, halfway between the tomb and the gateway, and a linear reflecting pool on the North-South axis reflect the Taj Mahal. Elsewhere the garden is laid out with avenues of trees and fountains. The charbagh garden is meant to symbolise the four flowing Rivers of Paradise. The raised marble water tank (hauz) is called al Hawd al-Kawthar, literally meaning and named after the "Tank of Abundance" promised to Muhammad in paradise where the faithful may quench their thirst upon arrival.

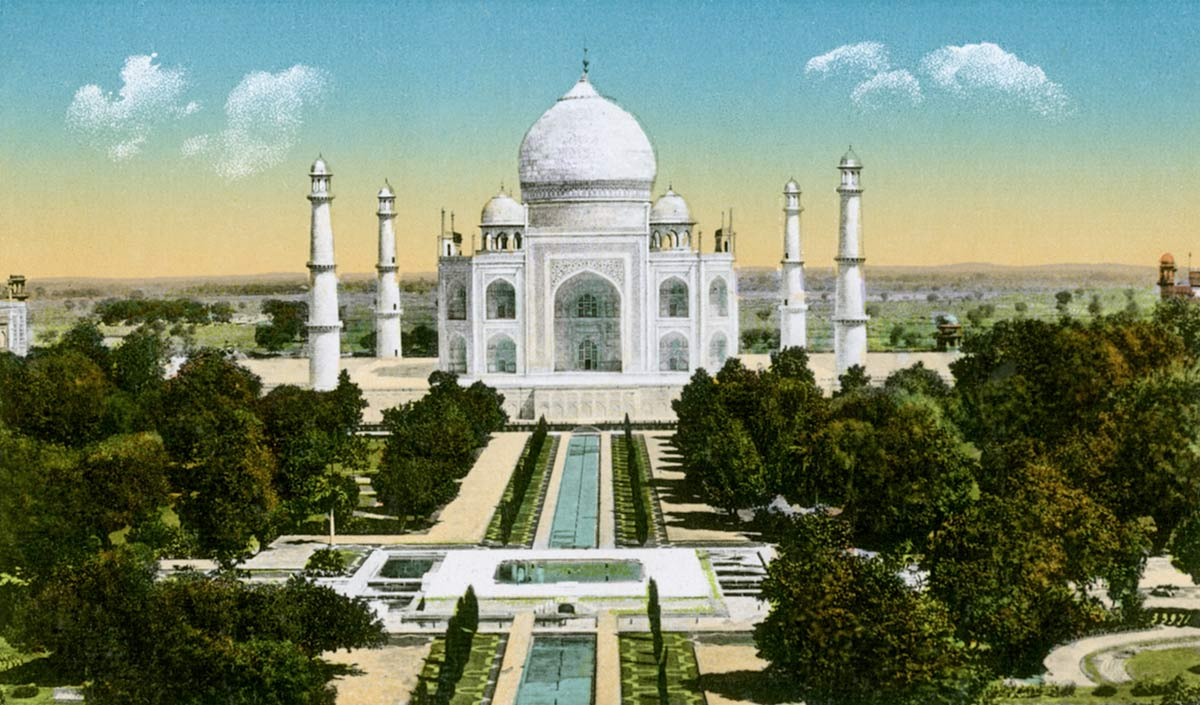
1910 postcard showing the trees before the British re-scaping.

The original planting of the garden is one of the Taj Mahal's remaining mysteries. The contemporary accounts mostly deal just with the architecture and only mention 'various kinds of fruit-bearing trees and rare aromatic herbs' in relation to the garden. Cypress trees are almost certainly to have been planted being popular similes in Persian poetry for the slender elegant stature of the beloved. By the end of the 18th century, Thomas Twining noted orange trees and a large plan of the complex suggests beds of various other fruits such as pineapples, pomegranates, bananas, limes and apples. The British gardener A. E. P. Griessen, under the viceroy Lord Curzon, at the end of the 19th century thinned out a lot of the increasingly forested trees, replanted the cypresses and laid the gardens to lawns in their own taste.

The layout of the garden, and its architectural features such as its fountains, brick and marble walkways, and geometric brick-lined flowerbeds are similar to Shalimar's, and suggest that the garden may have been designed by the same engineer, Ali Mardan.

Early accounts of the garden describe its profusion of vegetation, including roses, daffodils, and fruit trees in abundance. As the Mughal Empire declined, the tending of the garden declined as well.

=== Naubat Khana (Drum House) ===
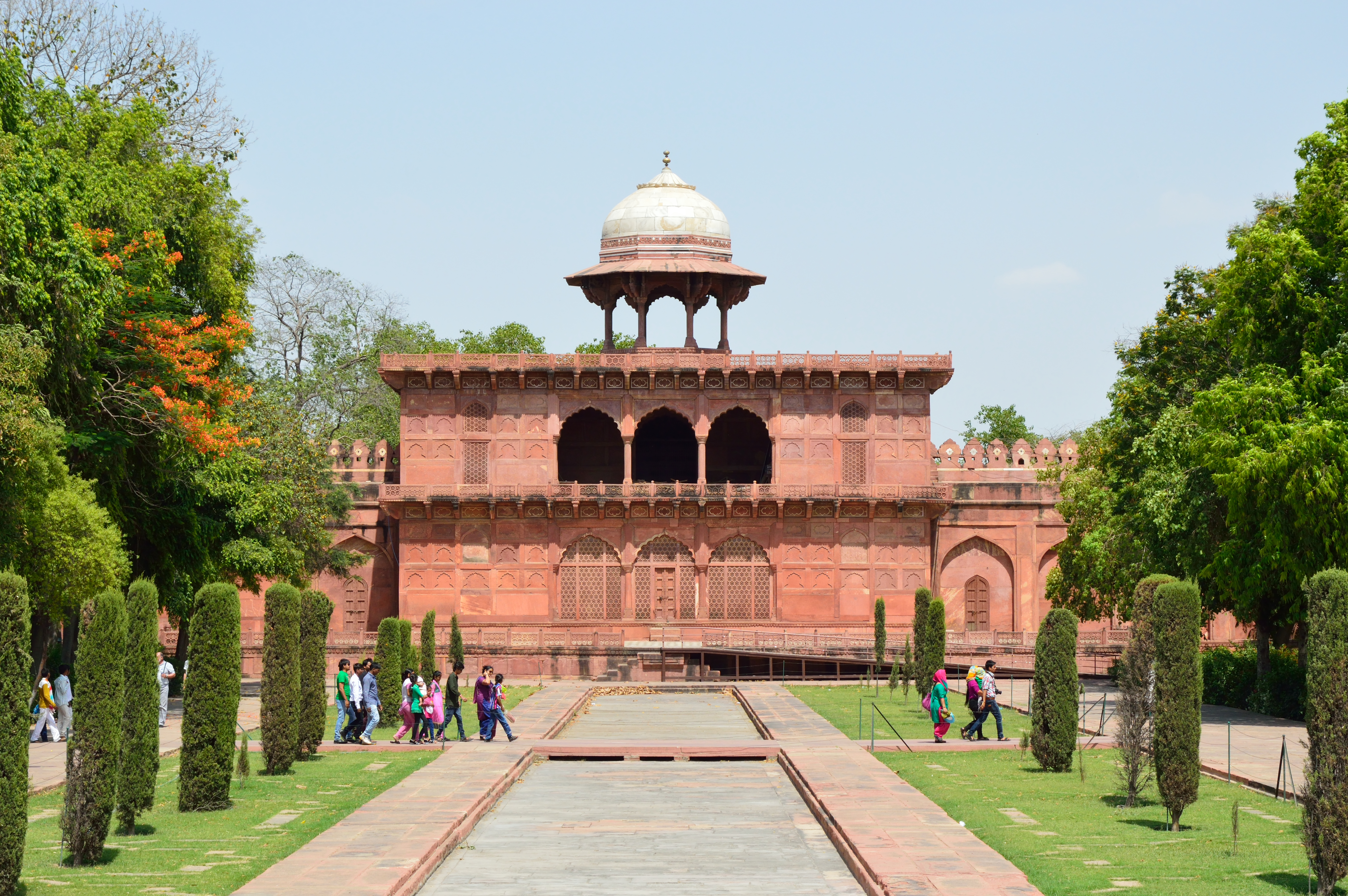
The eastern Naubat-Khana in the Taj Mahal complex

Two Drum Houses (Naubat-Khāna) occupy the east and west ends of the cross axis, one the mirror of the other. In the classic charbargh design, gates would have been located in this location. In the Taj they provide punctuation and access to the long enclosing wall with its decorative crenellations. Built of sandstone, they are given a tripartite form and over two storeys and are capped with a white marble chhatris supported from 8 columns. The western Naubat Khana has been converted into a museum.

=== Great gate (Darwaza-i rauza) ===
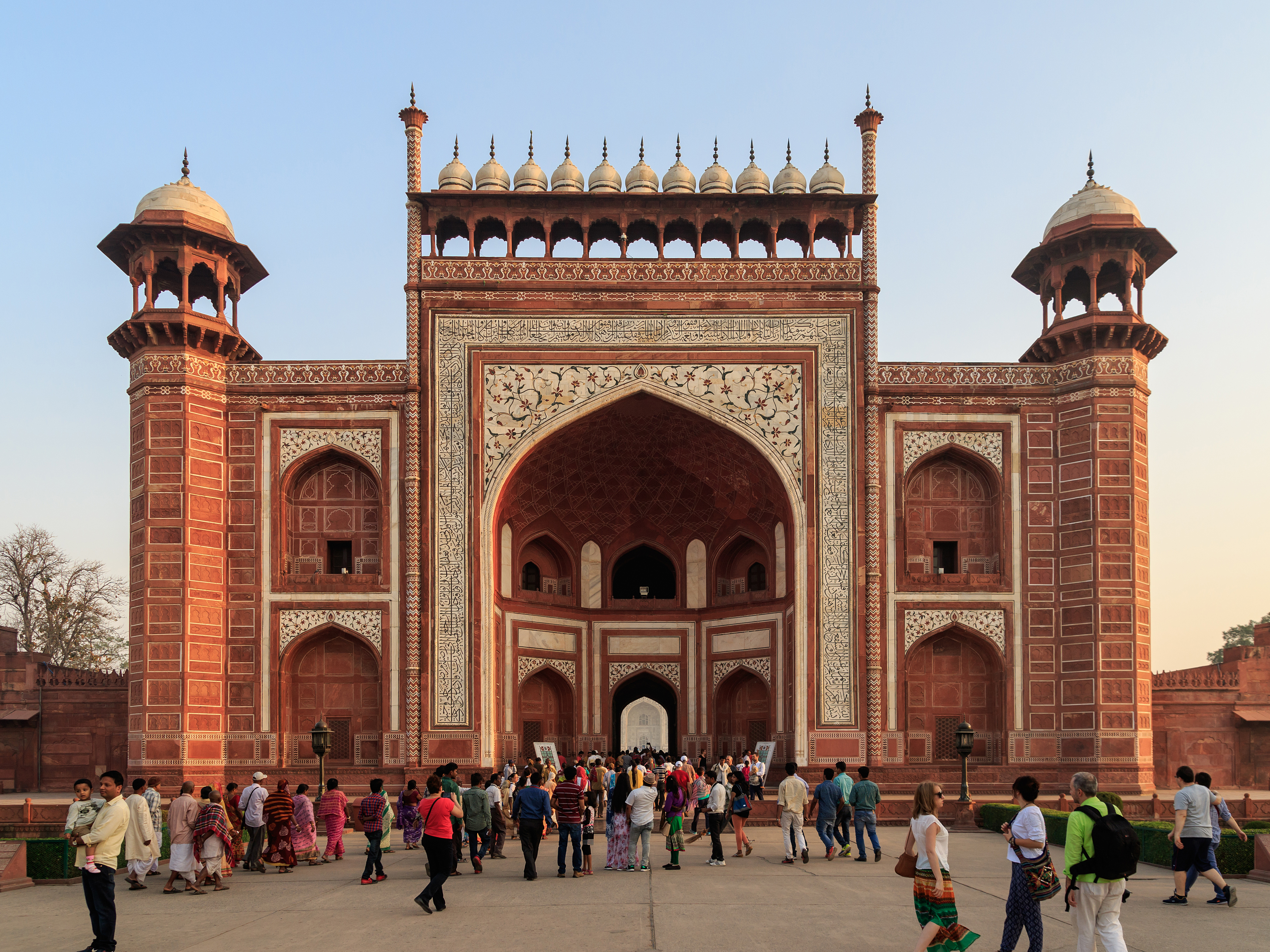
The Great Gate (Darwaza-i-rauza)

The great gate stands to the north of the entrance forecourt (jilaukhana) and provides a symbolic transition between the worldly realm of bazaars and caravanserai and the spiritual realm of the paradise garden, mosque and the mausoleum. Its rectangular plan is a variation of the 9-part hasht bihisht plan found in the mausoleum. The corners are articulated with octagonal towers giving the structure a defensive appearance. External domes were reserved for tombs and mosques and so the large central space does not receive any outward expression of its internal dome. From within the great gate, the Mausoleum is framed by the pointed arch of the portal. Inscriptions from the Qu'ran are inlaid around the two northern and southern pishtaqs, the southern one 'Daybreak' invites believers to enter the garden of paradise.

=== Southern galleries (Iwan Dar Iwan) ===
Running the length of the northern side of the southern garden wall to the east and west of the great gate are galleried arcades. The galleries were used during the rainy season to admit the poor and distribute alms. A raised platform with geometric paving provides a seating for the column bases and between them are cusped arches typical of the Mughul architecture of the period. The galleries terminate at each end with a transversely placed room with tripartite divisions.

=== Forecourt (Jilaukhana) ===
The jilaukhana (literally meaning 'in front of house') was a courtyard feature introduced to mughal architecture by Shah Jahan. It provided an area where visitors would dismount from their horses or elephants and assemble in style before entering the main tomb complex. The rectangular area divides north-south and east-west with an entry to the tomb complex through the main gate to the north and entrance gates leading to the outside provided in the eastern, western and southern walls. The southern gate leads to the Taj Ganji quarter.

Bazaar streets

Two identical streets lead from the east and west gates to the centre of the courtyard. They are lined by verandahed colonnades articulated with cusped arches behind which cellular rooms were used to sell goods from when the Taj was built until 1996. The tax revenue from this trade was used for the upkeep of the Taj complex. The eastern bazaar streets were essentially ruined by the end of the 19th century and were restored by Lord Curzon restored 1900 and 1908.

Inner subsidiary tombs (Saheli Burj)

Two mirror image tombs are located at the southern corners of the jilaukhana. They are conceived as miniature replicas of the main complex and stand on raised platforms accessed by steps. Each octagonal tomb is constructed on a rectangular platform flanked by smaller rectangular buildings in front of which is laid a charbargh garden. Some uncertainty exists as to whom the tombs might memorialise. Their descriptions are absent from the contemporary accounts (Note: 1643 (1053 AH) by Lahouri.) either because they were unbuilt or because they were ignored, being the tombs of women. On the first written document to mention them, the plan drawn up by Thomas and William Daniel in 1789, the eastern tomb is marked as that belonging to Akbarabadi Mahal and the western as Fatehpuri Mahal (two of Jahan's other wives).

Northern courtyards (Khawasspuras)

A pair of courtyards is found in the northern corners of the jilaukhana which provided quarters (Khawasspuras) for the tombs attendants and the Hafiz. This residential element provided a transition between the outside world and the other-worldly delights of the tomb complex. The Khawasspurs had fallen into a state of disrepair by the late 18th century but the institution of the Khadim continued into the 20th century. The Khawasspuras were restored by Lord Curzon as part of his repairs between 1900 and 1908, after which the western courtyard was used as a nursery for the garden and the western courtyard was used as a cattle stable until 2003.

=== Bazaar and caravanserai (Taj Ganji) ===
The Bazaar and caravanserai were constructed as an integral part of the complex, initially to provide the construction workers with accommodation and facilities for their wellbeing, and later as a place for trade, the revenue of which supplemented the expenses of the complex. The area became a small town in its own right during and after the building of the Taj. Originally known as 'Mumtazabad', today it is called Taj Ganji or 'Taj Market'. Its plan took the characteristic form of a square divided by two cross axial streets with gates to the four cardinal points. Bazaars lined each street and the resultant squares to each corner housed the caravanserais in open courtyards accessed from internal gates from where the streets intersected (Chauk). Contemporary sources pay more attention to the north eastern and western parts of the Taj Ganji (Taj Market) and it is likely that only this half received imperial funding. Thus, the quality of the architecture was finer than the southern half.

The distinction between how the sacred part of the complex and the secular was regarded is most acute in this part of the complex. Whilst the rest of the complex only received maintenance after its construction, the Taj Ganji became a bustling town and the centre of Agra's economic activity where "different kinds of merchandise from every land, varieties of goods from every country, all sorts of luxuries of the time, and various kinds of necessities of civilisation and comfortable living brought from all parts of the world" were sold. An idea of what sort of goods might have been traded is found in the names for the caravanserais; the north western one was known as Katra Omar Khan (Market of Omar Khan), the north eastern as Katra Fulel (Perfume Market), the south western as Katra Resham (Silk Market) and the south-eastern as Katra Jogidas. It has been constantly redeveloped ever since its construction, to the extent that by the 19th century it had become unrecognisable as part of the Taj Mahal and no longer featured on contemporary plans and its architecture was largely obliterated. Today, the contrast is stark between the Taj Mahal's elegant, formal geometric layout and the narrow streets with organic, random and un-unified constructions found in the Taj Ganji. Only fragments of the original constructions remain, most notably the gates.

=== Perimeter walls and ancillary buildings ===
The Taj Mahal complex is bounded on three sides by crenellated red sandstone walls, with the river-facing side left open. The garden-facing inner sides of the wall are fronted by columned arcades, a feature typical of Hindu temples which was later incorporated into Mughal mosques. The wall is interspersed with domed chhatris, and small buildings that may have been viewing areas or watch towers.

Outside the walls are several additional mausolea. These structures, composed primarily of red sandstone, are typical of the smaller Mughal tombs of the era. The outer eastern tomb has an associated mosque called the Black Mosque (Kali Masjid) or the Sandalwood Mosque (Sandli Masjid). The design is closely related to the inner subsidiary tombs found in the Jilhaukhana – small, landlocked versions of the riverfront terrace with a garden separating the mosque from the tomb. The person interred here is unknown, but was likely a female member of Jahan's household.

=== Waterworks ===
Water for the Taj complex was provided through a complex infrastructure. It was first drawn from the river by a series of purs – an animal-powered rope and bucket mechanism. The water then flowed along an arched aqueduct into a large storage tank, where, by thirteen additional purs, it was raised to large distribution cistern above the Taj ground level located to the west of the complex's wall. From here water passed into three subsidiary tanks and was then piped to the complex. The head of pressure generated by the height of the tanks (9.5m) was sufficient to supply the fountains and irrigate the gardens. A 0.25 metre diameter earthenware pipe lies 1.8 metres below the surface, in line with the main walkway which fills the main pools of the complex. Some of the earthenware pipes were replaced in 1903 with cast iron. The fountain pipes were not connected directly to the fountain heads, instead a copper pot was provided under each fountain head: water filled the pots ensuring an equal pressure to each fountain. The purs no longer remain, but the other parts of the infrastructure have survived with the arches of the aqueduct now used to accommodate offices for the Archaeological Survey of India's Horticultural Department.

=== Moonlight garden (Mahtab Bagh) ===
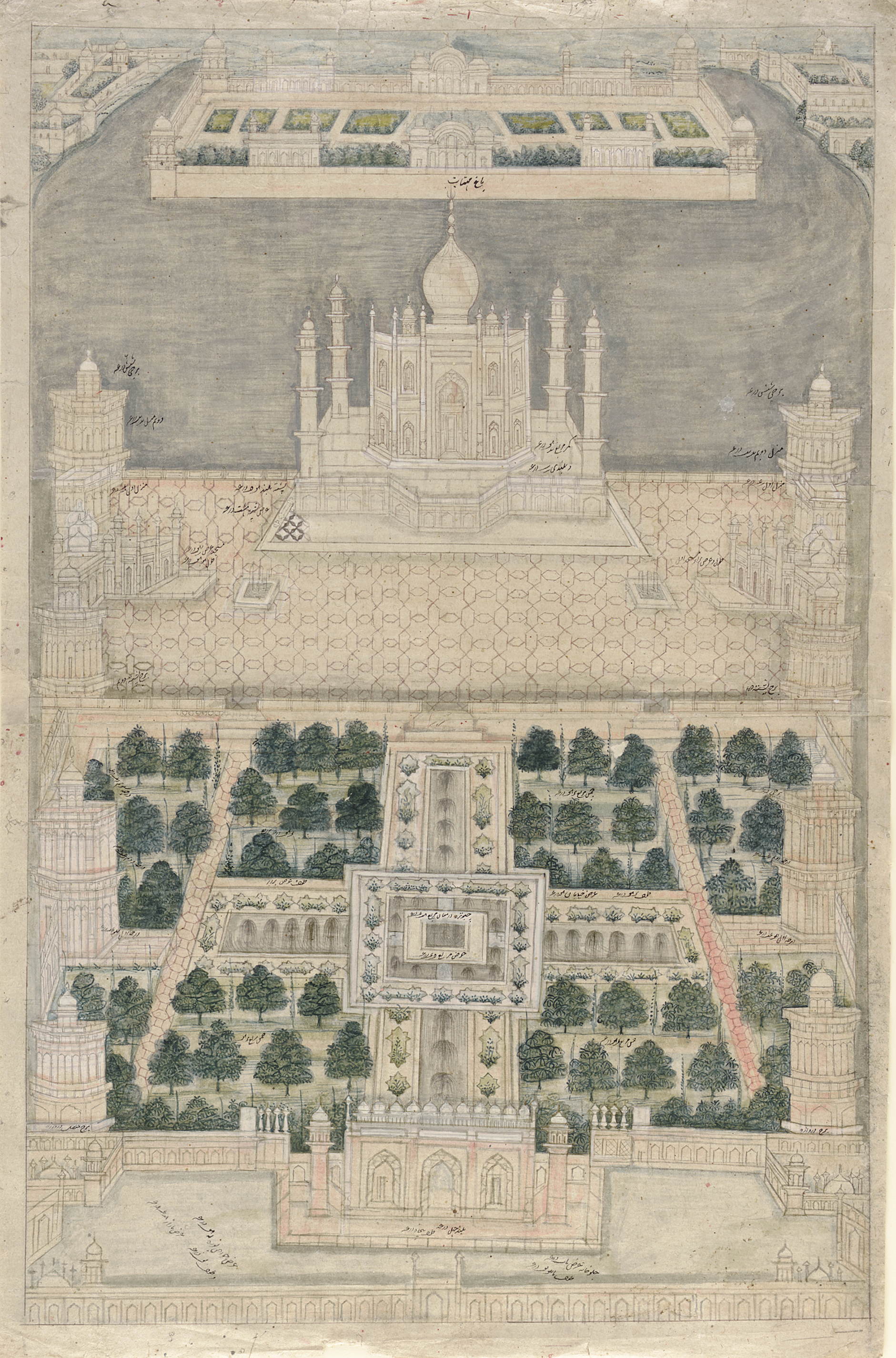
18th-century view of the Taj Mahal complex with the Moonlight garden shown at the top of the page.

To the north of the Taj Mahal complex, across the river is another Charbagh garden, Mehtab Bagh. It was designed as an integral part of the complex in the riverfront terrace pattern seen elsewhere in Agra. Its width is identical to that of the rest of the Taj. The garden historian Elizabeth Moynihan suggests the large octagonal pool in the centre of the terrace would reflect the image of the Mausoleum and thus the garden would provide a setting to view the Taj Mahal. The garden has been beset by flooding from the river since Mughal times. As a result, the condition of the remaining structures is quite ruinous, but the garden is under renovation by the Archaeological Survey of India. Four sandstone towers marked the corners of the garden, only the south-eastward one remains. The foundations of two structures remain immediately north and south of the large pool which were probably garden pavilions. From the northern structure a stepped waterfall would have fed the pool. The garden to the north has the typical square, cross-axial plan with a square pool in its centre. To the west an aqueduct fed the garden.

== Bibliography ==
- Asher, Catherine Ella Blanshard (2003) [first published 1992]. The New Cambridge History of India, Vol I:4 – Architecture of Mughal India (Hardback). Cambridge: Cambridge University Press. p. 368. ISBN 0-521-26728-5.
- Aziz, Abdul (1928). "History of the Reign of Shah Jahan". Journal of Indian History. 6: 127–47.
- Balasubramaniam, R (10 July 2009). "New insights on the modular planning of the Taj Mahal" (PDF). Current Science. 97 (1): 42–49.
- Begley, Wayne E. (March 1979). "The myth of the Taj-Mahal and a new theory of its symbolic meaning". Art Bulletin. 61 (1): 7–37. doi:10.2307/3049862. JSTOR 3049862.
- Begley, Wayne E.; Desai, Z.A. (1989). Taj Mahal – The Illumined Tomb (Hardback). University of Washington Press. p. 392. ISBN 978-0-295-96944-2.
- Begley, Wayne E.; Grabar, Oleg (Ed.) (1983). "Four Mughal Caravanserais Built during the Reigns of Jahangir and Shah Jahan". Muqarnas Volume I: An Annual on Islamic Art and Architecture. Yale University Press (Newhaven). pp. 167–180. Archived from the original on 12 June 2006.
- Bernier, François (1891). Travels in the Moghul Empire A.D. 1657–1668. Westminster: Archibald Constable & Co.
- Chaghtai, Muhammad Abdullah (1938). Le Tadj Mahal d'Agra (Inde). Histoire et description (in French). Brussels: Editions de la Connaissance. .
- Copplestone, Trewin. (ed). (1963). World architecture – An illustrated history (Hardback). London: Hamlyn. ASIN B0000CNOL6.
- Encyclopædia Britannica, 1964 Ed., Vol. 21, Badshahnama, Vol. I, line 35 – sale ayandeh, The Illustrated Weekly of India dated Dec. 30, 1951 and Travels in India, ibid. (24 August 2013). "Taj Mahal Vedic Features". HariBhakt | History, Facts, Awareness of Hindu Dharma -. HariBhakt Blog.
- Harkness, Terence; Sinha, Amita (1 July 2004). "Taj Heritage Corridor: Intersections between History and Culture on the Yamuna Riverfront". Places. 16 (2): 62–69.
- Kambo, Muhammad Salih (1927) [1923]. Yazdani, Ghulam (ed.). Amal-i-Salih or Shah Jahan Namah. Vol. I and II. Calcutta: Baptist Mission Press.
- Kennedy, Thalia (March 2007). "The Notion of Hierarchy: The 'Parchin Kari' Programme at the Taj Mahal". Archnet-IJAR, International Journal of Architectural Research. 1 (1): 105–121. Archived from the original on 14 June 2009.
- Koch, Ebba (August 2006). The Complete Taj Mahal: And the Riverfront Gardens of Agra (Hardback) (First ed.). Thames & Hudson Ltd. pp. 288 pages. ISBN 0-500-34209-1.
- Lahauri, Abd al-Hamid (1867–1868). Maulawis Kabir al-Din Ahmad and 'Abd al-Rahim under the superintendence of William Nassau Lees (ed.). Badshah Namah. Vol. I and II. Calcutta: College Press.
- Latif, Syad Muhammad (April 2003) [1896]. Agra: Historical and Descriptive — With an Account of Akbar and His Court and of the Modern City of Agra. Asian Educational Services. ISBN 81-206-1709-6.
- Koch, Ebba (1997). Petruccioli, Attilio (ed.). "The Mughal Waterfront Garden. Gardens in the Time of the Great Muslim Empires: Theory and Design". E. J. Brill.
- Petruccioli, Attilio (June 2006). "Rethinking the Islamic Garden" (PDF). Bulletin 103. Yale School of Forestry and Environmental Studies.
- Qaisar, Ahsan Jan (April 1989). Building Construction in Mughal India (Hardback). Delhi: Oxford University Press. pp. 83 pages. ISBN 0-19-562260-X.
