= Patwant Singh =

Patwant Singh (28 March 1925 – 8 August 2009) was an Indian writer, publisher, and Sikh scholar. He was noted for his contributions to conservation and publishing.

== Biography ==
Patwant Singh was born on 28 March 1925. The son of a builder, Singh spent his early years in the newly developing Lutyens' Delhi, gaining practical experience in the construction industry through his father's firm, which proved more influential to his education than his formal schooling.

In 1952, Singh established a magazine publishing firm in Bombay. His initial venture, The Indian Builder, was a monthly publication focused on India's post-independence building industry, highlighting its challenges and achievements. He then launched The Pharmaceutist, a magazine dedicated to the growing pharmaceutical industry, despite his lack of background in the field.

Singh's next major publication was Design, a magazine that critically examined architecture, urban planning, industrial design, graphics, and visual arts. The magazine, which he edited for 31 years, served as a forum for various professionals in these fields, featuring contributions from architects and artists such as Peter Blake and Eero Saarinen.

Relocating to Delhi in 1962, Singh's interests expanded to include political commentary, particularly focusing on the governance of post-colonial India and its reliance on Western economic and technological models. His first book, India and the Future of Asia, published in 1966, reflected these themes.

Singh was instrumental in the establishment of a statutory body in 1974 for monitoring new building projects and conserving historic structures in Delhi.

During the 1984 Golden Temple crisis, Singh attempted to mediate between the Sikh hard-liners and the Indian army, reflecting his commitment to the Sikh faith. His book 'The Golden Temple', published in 1989, aimed to clarify misconceptions about Sikhism.

In his later years, Singh wrote extensively on political and social issues in India. His works, such as Of Dreams and Demons (1994) and The Second Partition: Fault-Lines in India's Democracy (2007), critiqued contemporary Indian politics and societal challenges. He also authored The Sikhs (1999) and co-authored Empire of the Sikhs (2008) with Jyoti M Rai, providing insights into Sikh history. The World According to Washington (2004) was his critique of global military policies.

Singh also chaired a family trust responsible for establishing the Kabliji Hospital and Rural Health Centre near Delhi, a facility aimed at serving medically underserved villages. His second wife, Meher, managed the administration of the hospital.
