= Arthur Shoosmith =

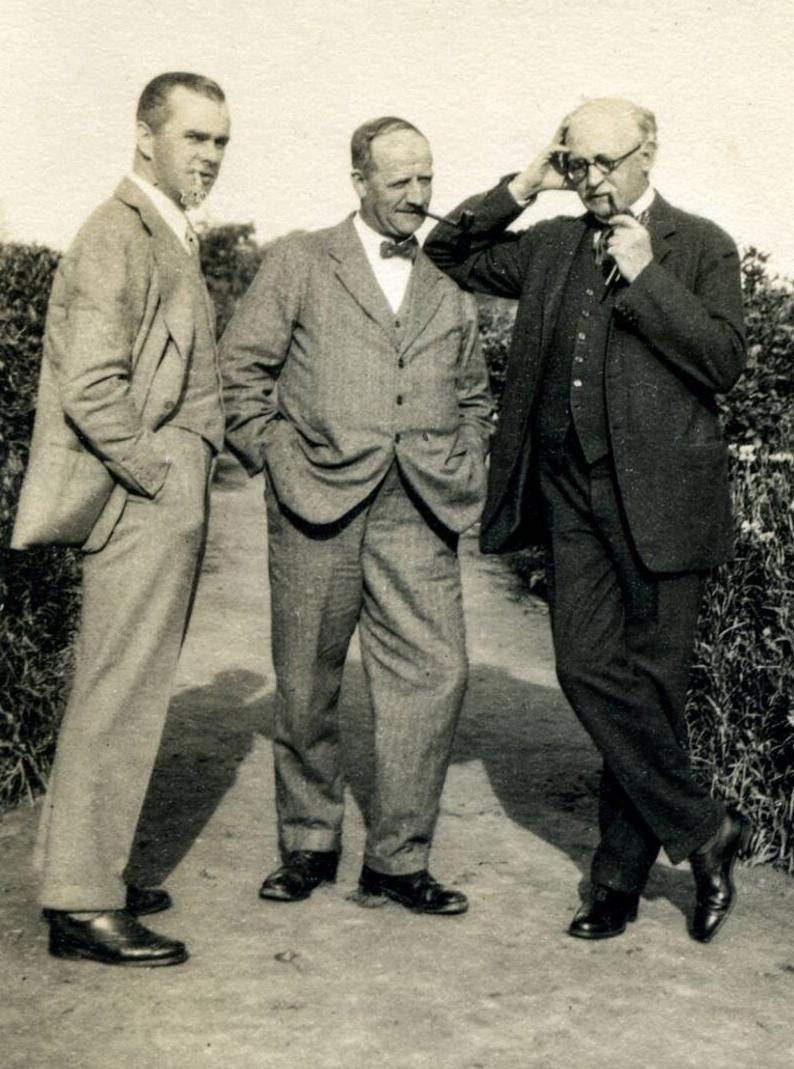
Left to right: Shoosmith with W. R. Mustoe and Edwin Lutyens in Delhi, 1930

Arthur Shoosmith OBE (1888 - 1974) was an English architect who emigrated to India and worked for a time on behalf of the well-known English architect Sir Edwin Lutyens.

== Early years ==
Shoosmith was born in 1888 in St Petersburg, Russia and grew up in Russia and Finland. He was educated in England before attending the Royal Academy Schools in 1911.

== Career ==
Shoosmith won the RIBA's Soane Medallion in 1920. He took up work as the representative in India of Sir Edwin Lutyens where, until 1931, he supervised the construction of the Viceroy's House in New Delhi.

Operating from Lutyens' New Delhi office, Shoosmith then designed St Martin's Garrison Church in Delhi, now described as a "real highlight" and "one of the finest buildings of the twentieth century". The church was built using three-and-a-half million red bricks but very modern for its time, square and almost windowless. The soldiers claimed it was like a fortress, excellent to defend in an emergency. It was completed in 1930.

He was awarded an OBE in the 1930 New Years Honours.

Shoosmith's other building which he designed himself was the Lady Hardinge Serai, a guesthouse in Delhi, completed in 1931.

He returned to England in 1931, where he spent the remainder of his career in teaching, before retiring in 1957.
