= Arthur Harold Dickinson =

British senior colonial police officer (1892–1978)

Arthur Harold Dickinson CMG OBE KPM
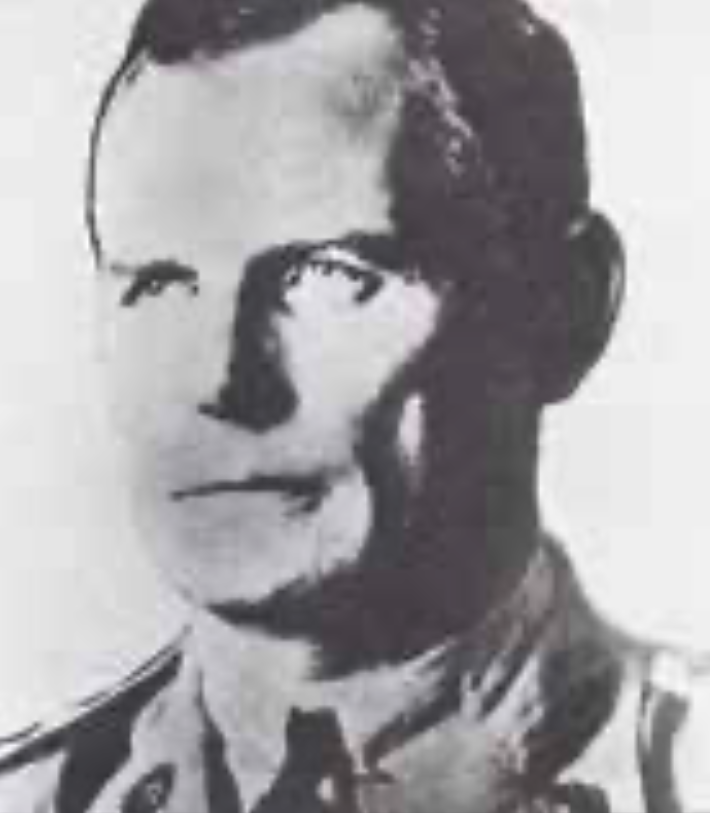

10th Inspector-General of the Straits Settlements Police
- In office 1939–1942
- Preceded by: René Onraet
- Succeeded by: Robert Edward Foulger

Personal details
- Born: Arthur Harold Dickinson; 5 October 1892 Nhill, Victoria, Australia
- Died: 23 November 1978 (aged 86) Britain, U.K
- Spouse: Ethel Constance Kitchen (m. 1920)
- Children: 2
- Occupation: Senior colonial police officer
- Profession: law enforcement

Arthur Harold Dickinson CMG OBE KPM (5 October 1892 – 23 November 1978) was a British senior colonial police officer who served as Inspector-General of the Straits Settlements Police from 1939 to 1942.

== Early life and education ==
Dickinson was born on 5 October 1892 in Nhill, Victoria, Australia, and was educated at Bromsgrove School.

== Career ==
In 1912, he joined the Colonial Police Service as a cadet, was appointed police probationer and served in the Straits Settlements Police Force. In 1928 he was promoted to Superintendent of Police in Singapore. From 1931 to 1932 he was sent on special missions to study police methods, to Paris, Shanghai, Hong Kong, Manila, Batavia, Bangkok and Saigon. On his return to the Straits Settlements he was appointed Chief Police Officer, Penang. He was then Chief Police Officer, Selangor, in the Federated Malay States Police (FMSP). In 1937, he was awarded the first officership of the OBE ever conferred upon a member of the police force for his "tactful handling" of serious strikes in the Federated Malay States.

In 1939, after serving as Chief Police Officer of Singapore, he was promoted to Inspector-General of Police of the Straits Settlements Police Force. The same year, he established and headed the Malayan Security Service which was responsible for political and security intelligence, replacing the Malayan Police Special Branch. On 15 February 1942, he was at the meeting of senior officers, as the only member of the civilian government, which decided to surrender Singapore to the Japanese army. From 1942 to 1944, he was a prisoner of war (POW) in Singapore. He retired in 1946.

== Personal life and death ==
Dickinson married Ethel Constance Kitchen in 1920 and they had a son and a daughter. He died in Britain on 23 November 1978.

== Honours ==
Dickinson was awarded the King's Police Medal in 1928. He was appointed Member of the Order of the British Empire (OBE) in the 1938 New Year Honours. He was appointed Companion of the Order of St Michael and St George (CMG) in the 1946 New Year Honours.

== See also ==
- Commissioner of Police (Singapore)
