= George Percy Cuscaden =

Singaporean-born colonial official in Malaya (1883 – 1956)

George Percy Cuscaden ISO
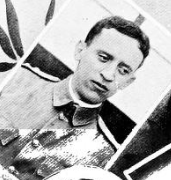
- From a 1908 publication

Chief Police Officer of Selangor
- In office 1919–1932
- Commissioners: William Lance Conlay; Charles Hannigan; Charles Henry Sansom

Commissioner of Johore Police Force
- In office 1912–1919

Chief Police Officer of Negeri Sembilan
- In office 1908–1912
- Commissioners: Henry Lynch Talbot; William Willes Douglas

Personal details
- Born: 25 March 1883 Singapore, Straits Settlements
- Died: 21 December 1956 (aged 72)
- Spouse: Kathleen Mary Rutherford Oliphant Morrison
- Parent: William Andrew Cuscaden ISO (father)

Military service
- Branch/service: Johore Volunteer Rifles
- Battles/wars: World War I

George Percy Cuscaden ISO (25 March 1883 – 21 December 1956) was the Chief Police Officer of Selangor, Federated Malay States, from 1919 to 1932.

== Early life ==
George Percy Cuscaden was born on 25 March 1883 in Singapore, son of William Andrew Cuscaden who was Inspector General of Police, Straits Settlements Police Force. In 1902, he joined the Royal Irish Constabulary but left at the end of the year to join the government of the Straits Settlements.

== Career ==
In 1903, he was sworn in as Assistant Superintendent of Police, Federated Malay States Police, and in May 1904, became Assistant Commissioner of Police in Taiping, before being transferred to Negeri Sembilan as Chief Police Officer and Adjutant whilst also serving as Assistant Commissioner and Acting Superintendent of Prisons.

In 1912, he was sent to Johore with instructions to modernise the police force which was inefficient and poorly led, and there he served for seven years as Commissioner of Police and Public Prosecutor. During World War One, he acted as commanding officer of the Johore Volunteer Rifles.

In 1919, he left Johore and went to Kuala Lumpur where he was appointed Chief Police Officer of Selangor, Federated Malay States, remaining in the post until his retirement on health grounds in 1932.

== Awards ==
In 1932, he was awarded the Imperial Service Order.

== Personal life and death ==
In 1923, Cuscaden married Kathleen Mary Oliphant Morrison. He was a keen sportsman, playing rugby for Singapore and for Selangor which he captained.

He died on 21 December 1956 at Bexhill, England.
