= René Onraet =

René Onraet CMG
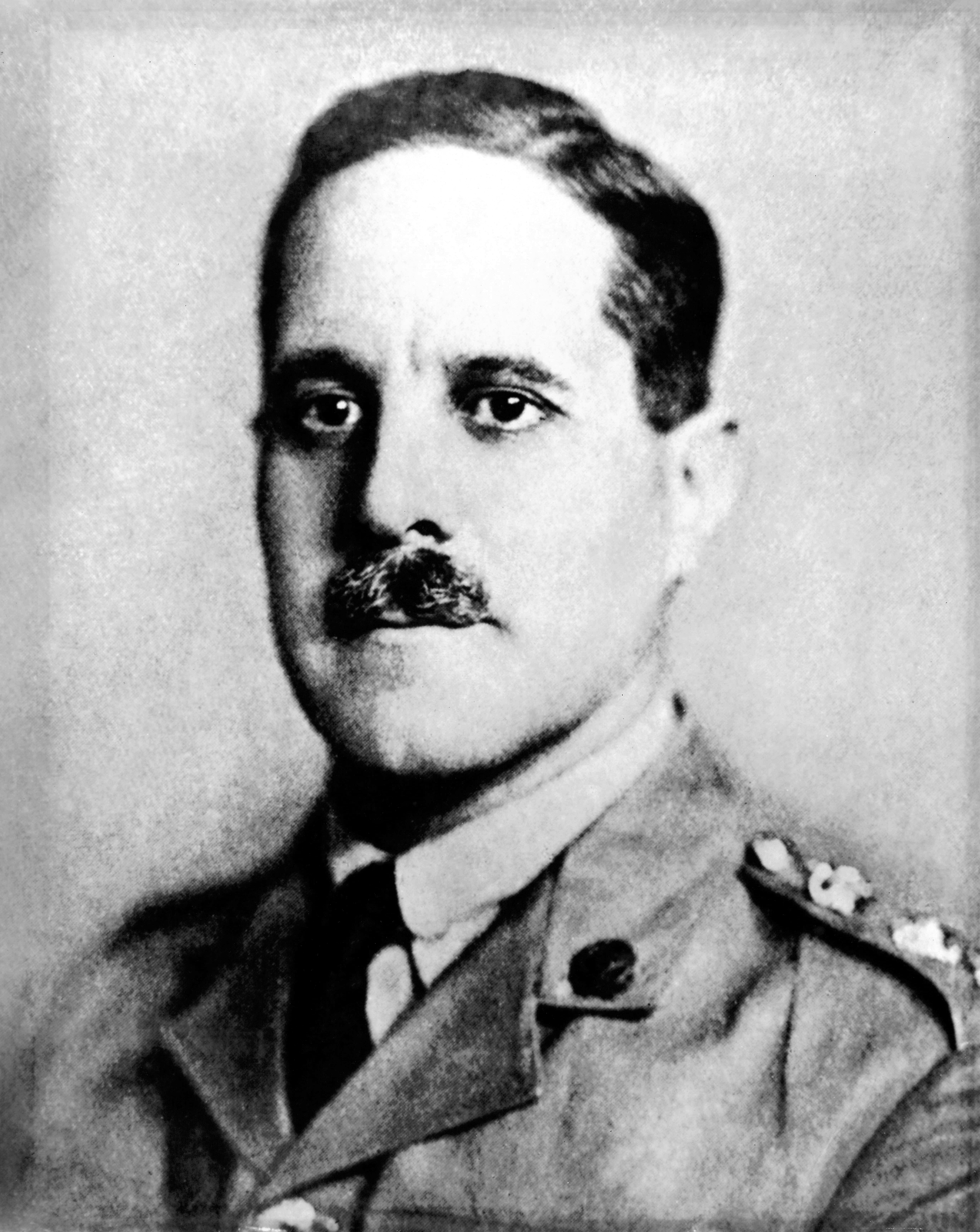
- Onraet in 1939

9th Inspector-General of the Straits Settlements Police
- In office 1935–1939
- Preceded by: Harold Fairburn
- Succeeded by: Arthur Harold Dickinson

Personal details
- Born: René Henry de Solminihac Onraet; 6 April 1887 Darjeeling, India
- Died: 8 May 1952 (aged 65) Lancashire, England
- Profession: Police officer Intelligence officer

René Henry de Solminihac Onraet (6 April 1887 – 8 May 1952) was the Inspector-General of the Straits Settlements Police.

== Early life and education ==
Onraet was born in Darjeeling, India on 6 April 1887. He studied at Stonyhurst College in Lancashire, England.

== Career ==
In August 1907, he joined the Straits Settlements Police Force as a cadet. A few months later, he left for Xiamen, China, where he stayed for twenty months and learned Hokkien. From 1911 to 1917, he served as the Chief Police Officer of Province Wellesley. In 1914, he attended a training course at the Royal Irish Constabulary Depot in Dublin. Throughout the 1910s, he helped to capture the organised gambling syndicate in Penang. In Singapore, he raided gambling dens and closed them down. He was appointed the head of the police force's Detective Branch. In 1922, Onraet was appointed the superintendent and director of the police force's Criminal Intelligence Department, which later came to be known as the Special Branch and served as its second director until 1933. He would frequently disguise himself as a coolie in order to locate communist agents. In 1928, he led an assault on a bomb-making factory on Balestier Road.

In 1935, Onraet was appointed the Inspector-General of the Straits Settlements Police. By then, he had also served as the Chief Police Officer of Penang, Singapore, Malacca and Perak. In 1937, he travelled to Penang in order to quell a riot over goods imported from Manchuria, which was occupied by Japan at the time, that had begun two days prior. He also created a division within the police force to monitor Japanese espionage in British Malaya. He unsuccessfully called for a limit on Japanese migration to the colony. He retired to Britain in February 1939, after which he was made a Companion of The Most Distinguished Order of St Michael and St George. Following his retirement, The Sunday Times began publishing a series of articles which detailed several prominent cases which he had handled over the course of his career.

Following the beginning of World War II, Onraet joined the MI5 and served as an advisor to the West Indian police. His memoir, titled Singapore: A Police Background, was published in 1946. Following the re-establishment of the Special Branch of the police force in Malaya, Onraet was appointed the branch's police affairs adviser. He delivered a report which would lead to the establishment of the Malayan Security Service, after which he retired to Hampshire, England.

== Personal life and death ==
He married Muriel Buryhope on 14 March 1914.

Onraet died in Hampshire on 8 May 1952.

== Bibliography ==
- Onraet, René (1938). Something about Horses in Malaya. Kelly & Walsh. pp. 133 pages.
- Onraet, René (1947). Singapore – A Police Background. Dorothy Crisp & Co. pp. 152 pages.

== See also ==
- Commissioner of Police (Singapore)
