= John Pennefather-Evans =

British colonial police officer (1894–1977)

John Pennefather-Evans CBE
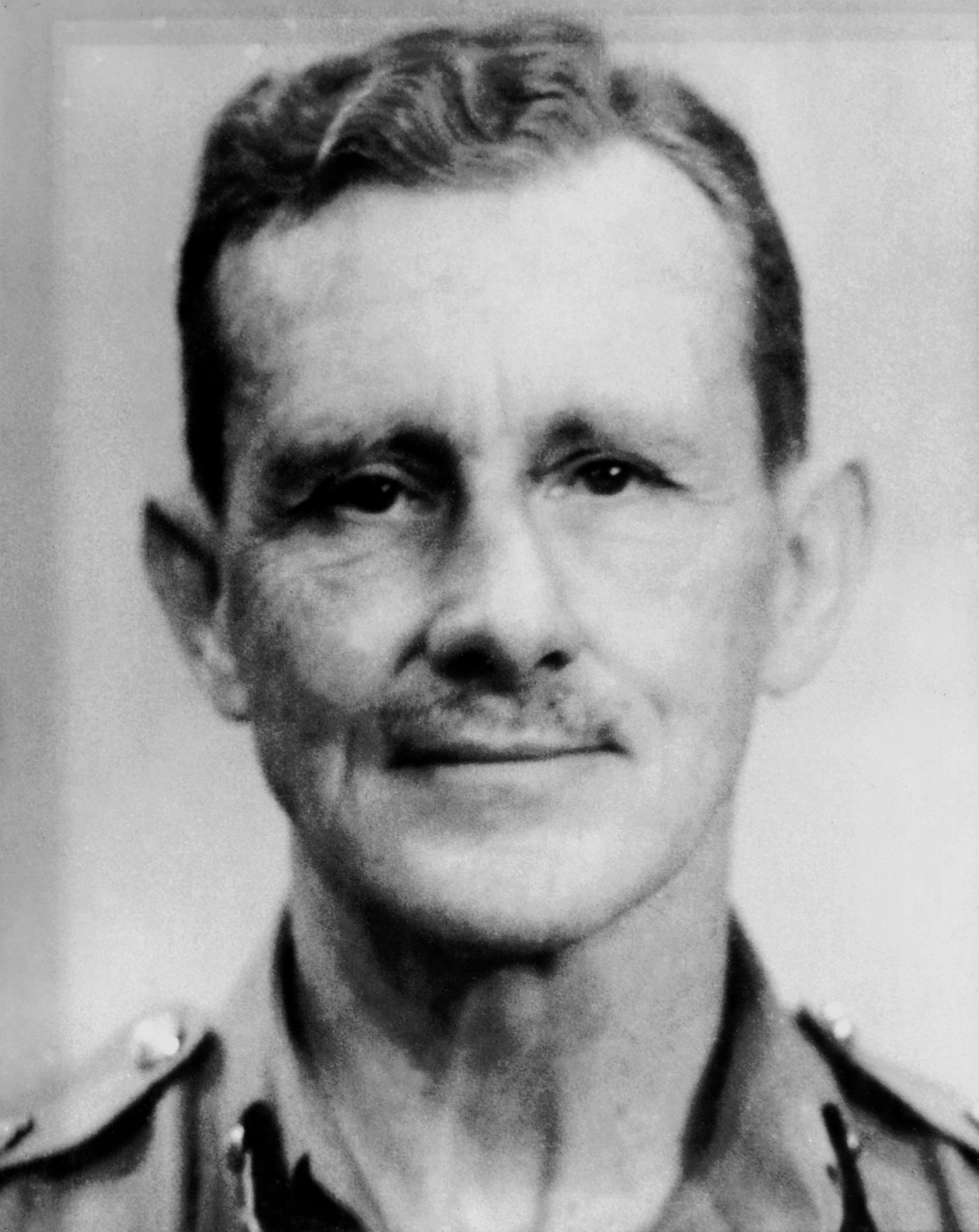

Commissioner of Police, Singapore
- In office 1951–1952
- Preceded by: Thomas Henry King
- Succeeded by: Kennosuke Noma (Kempeitai)

Commissioner of Police, Hong Kong
- In office 16 April 1941 – 26 December 1942

Chief Police Officer, Selangor
- In office 25 March 1939 – April 1941

Chief of Singapore Detective Branch
- In office 2 July 1938 – 24 March 1939
- Preceded by: 1
- Succeeded by: John Dally

Chief Police Officer, Singapore
- In office 16 June 1938 – 2 July 1938
- Preceded by: Mervyn Llewelyn Wynne
- Succeeded by: Ewald Egerton Herbert Beck

Personal details
- Born: 1 January 1894 Nepal
- Died: December 2, 1977 (aged 83) South Africa
- Spouse: Jane Constance Alice Miller

John Pennefather Pennefather-Evans, or Tup, was a British colonial police officer who served for over 27 years in various police forces across British Malaya before the outbreak of the World War II. During his career, he served with the Federated Malay States Police, the Straits Settlements Police Force, and various services of the Unfederated Malay States.

Before the war, he served as the Chief Police Officer of Singapore. During the Battle of Hong Kong, he was appointed Commissioner of Police for Hong Kong. Following the Japanese occupation, he was interned at Stanley Internment Camp. After the war, he returned to Singapore and served as the Colony of Singapore's Commissioner of Police.

== Early life ==
John Pennefather-Evans was born in Nepal in 1894 to Granville Pennefather-Evans and Grace Woodburn Hennessy, who had married in Dacca, Bengal, in 1893. His father, Granville, was an officer in the Indian Army and received his commission in 1890. John was one of three brothers. His younger brother Humphrey was born in Benares, India, in 1896, while his brother Brian was born in London in 1897. In 1901, the three brothers were living in Wimbledon under the care of a governess.

In 1911, John attended a boarding school in Fleetwood, Lancashire, together with his brother Humphrey.

== Career ==
=== Federated Malay States Police ===
In 1914, he entered into the Federated Malay States Police as a police probationer. In 1918, he was promoted to Acting Chief of Police.

In 1921, he was appointed Adjutant at the Federal Headquarters of the FMS Police in Kuala Lumpur.

In 1924, he took command of the FMS Police Training Depot for two years.

Later, he was promoted to Superintendent of Police in Taiping, Perak.

In 1931, he became Acting Commissioner of Police for Kedah.

=== Straits Settlements Police Force ===
In 1932, he became a Superintendent of Police in Singapore for the Straits Settlements Police Force.

In 1933, he was promoted to Commandant of the Singapore Police Training Depot.

In 1935, he was made the Director of Special Branch.

In 1938, he became the Acting Chief Police Officer, Singapore.

In 1939, he was made Director of the Detective Branch at Singapore.

Later in 1939, he became Chief Police Officer, Selangor.

=== Hong Kong Police ===
In January 1941, while Pennefather-Evans was on leave in England, his announcement as the Commissioner of Police for Hong Kong was made. He did not officially take up the position until his return to Asia in the Spring of that year.

He was serving in this capacity during the Battle of Hong Kong.

After the Kempeitai took over the police, Pennefather-Evans was interned at Stanley Internment Camp.

=== Singapore Police Force ===
In 1951, Pennefather-Evans was made Commissioner of Police for the Colony of Singapore. He retired in 1952.
