= How Kwang Hwee =

Singaporean police commissioner

- 侯光辉

Commissioner of Police
- Incumbent
- Assumed office 2026
- Preceded by: Hoong Wee Teck

Personal details
- Born: 1979 (age 46–47) Singapore
- Education: University of Oxford (BE); Stanford University (MS)
- Profession: Police officer

How Kwang Hwee (Chinese: 侯光辉) is the current Commissioner of Police of the Singapore Police Force (SPF).

== Early life and education ==
How was born in Singapore in 1979 and studied at Victoria School where he was a member of the National Police Cadet Corps and Victoria Junior College. In 1998, he was awarded the prestigious Singapore Police Force Scholarship. He joined SPF after graduating from the University of Oxford with a degree in Electrical and Civil Engineering in 2002. In 2014, he obtained a postgraduate Master of Science in Management from the Stanford University.

== Career ==
How has held various leadership appointments at SPF, including as deputy commissioner (policy), deputy commissioner (investigation and intelligence), director of the Criminal Investigation Department, and director of the Operations Department. He also served at the Ministry of Home Affairs Headquarters as senior director of the policy development division.

How had led major operations, such as the security planning for the 2018 North Korea–United States Singapore Summit, a meeting between North Korean Chairman Kim Jong Un and U.S. president Donald Trump, and anti-money laundering cases resulting in the arrest of multiple foreign nationals.

In 2024, How, on behalf of SPF, thanked outgoing Singapore Prime Minister Lee Hsien Loong for his unstinting support to the SPF throughout his premiership.

After serving 27 years in SPF, he was appointed as the Commissioner of Police on 5 January 2026.
