= Harold Fairburn =

English police officer

Harold Fairburn CMG KPM
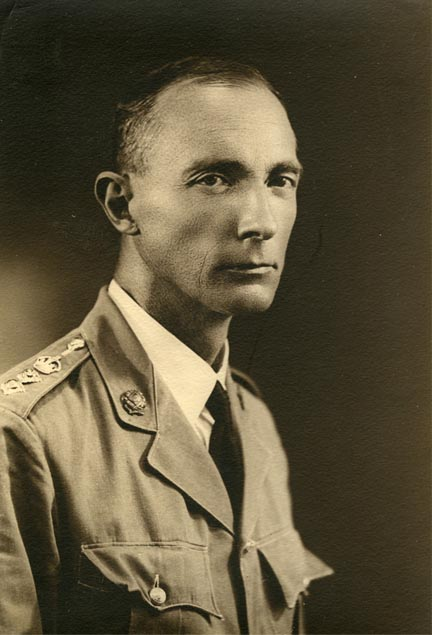

8th Inspector-General of the Straits Settlements Police Force
- In office 1925–1935
- Preceded by: G C Denham
- Succeeded by: René Onraet

Personal details
- Born: Harold Fairburn; 27 May 1884 Carlton, England
- Died: 7 July 1973 (aged 89) Weston-super-Mare, England
- Profession: Police officer

Harold Fairburn CMG, KPM (1884–1973) was the Inspector-General of the Straits Settlements Police Force from 1925 to 1935.

== Career ==
He joined the Straits Settlements Police Force as a cadet in 1904 and went on to become Inspector-General when he succeeded G.C. Denham in 1925. With the support of Sir Hugh Clifford, the Governor of the Straits Settlements, he initiated an extensive reorganization of the police force. This included the construction of new police stations and officer's barracks.

== Recognition ==
He is recognized for many improvements that were made in the working conditions of serving officers. In the years following World War I the rising level of inflation had significantly reduced the value of wages, which led to an increase in the amount of debt amongst junior officers. In 1926, he became the president and adviser to the Singapore Police Cooperative Thrift and Loan Society, which gave officers their own collective credit scheme and helped them to manage savings. He retired in 1935, and René Onraet was named as Inspector-General.

== Personal life and death ==
He married Maeve Buckley in 1925, and together they had one son, Dr A.C. Fairburn.

He died in Somerset on 7 July 1973.

== See also ==
- Commissioner of Police (Singapore)
