= William Andrew Cuscaden =

Irish-born police officer (1853–1936)

William Andrew Cuscaden ISO KPM
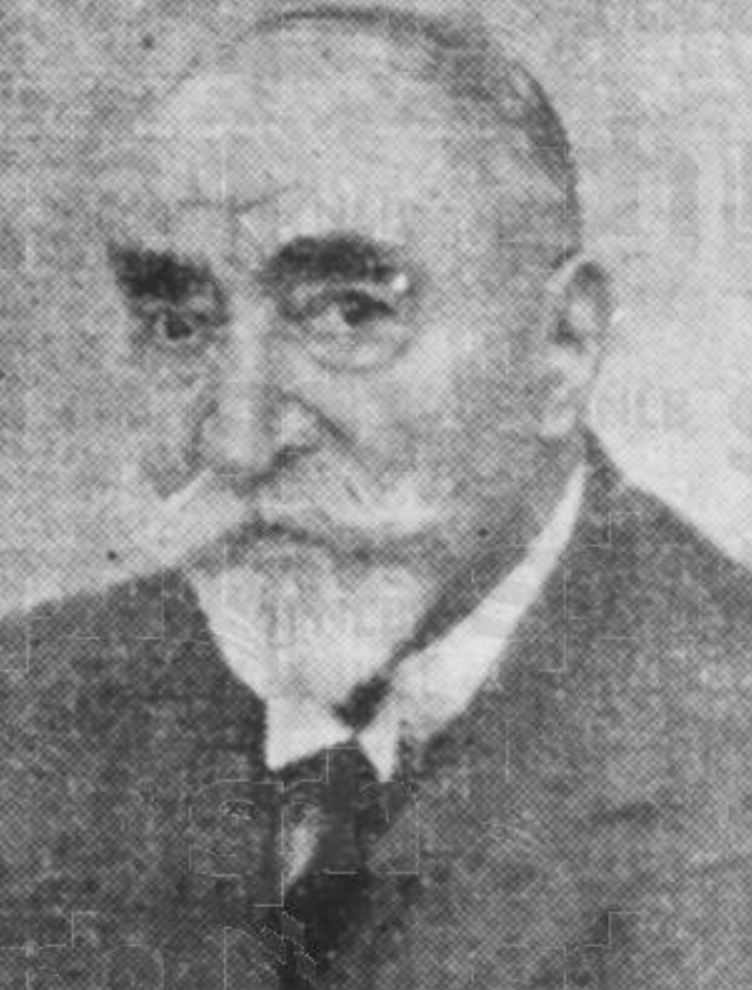
- William Andrew Cuscaden

5th Inspector-General of the Straits Settlements Police
- In office 1906–1914
- Preceded by: Edward Graham Pennefather
- Succeeded by: Alexander Richard Chancellor

Chief Police Officer, Singapore
- In office 1902–1906

Chief Police Officer, Malacca
- In office 1897

Personal details
- Born: 1 November 1853 Cahore, County Wexford, British Ireland
- Died: 5 August 1936 (aged 82) Egham, Surrey, England
- Education: Diocesan School, Wexford; Trinity College, Dublin
- Profession: Police officer

Military service
- Branch/service: Royal Dublin Fusiliers
- Unit: 4th Battalion

William Andrew Cuscaden ISO, KPM (1 November 1853 — 5 August 1936) was the Inspector-General of Police in the Straits Settlements Police Force. He was also capped once for the Ireland national rugby union team.

== Early life and education ==
Cuscaden attended Trinity College Dublin. After leaving the college, he joined the 4th Royal Dublin Fusiliers, where he became the Instructor of Musketry.

== Career ==
He joined the Gold Coast Constabulary in 1879. In 1880, he became the Assistant District Commissioner of Lagos.

In 1883, Cuscaden was appointed Chief Inspector in the Straits Settlements Police Force. In the following year, he was appointed Assistant Superintendent. In 1905, he became the Inspector-General of the Straits Settlements. He retired from the position in 1913 and left the colony on 2 September 1913. After his retirement, he was replaced by A. R. Chancellor.

During World War I, he resumed his position as an Instructor of Musketry. Cuscaden Road was named after him on 7 June 1921.

== Personal life and death ==
He was married to Maria Christina Cuscaden, and together they had four sons, G. P. Cuscaden, the Chief Police Officer of Selangor, R. L. Cuscaden, W. L. Cuscaden and Norman Henry Dawson Cuscaden. After his retirement, he moved to Westbourne Grove in Paddington, London.

He died on 5 August 1936.

== Ranks ==
Image	Date	Rank	Service	Ref.
	?	Captain and Instructor of Musketry	Royal Dublin Fusiliers	
	1879	Assistant Inspector	Gold Coast Constabulary	
	1880	Assistant District Commissioner, Lagos	Gold Coast Constabulary	
	1883	Chief Inspector of Police, Singapore	Straits Settlements Police Force	
	1883	Acting Assistant Superintendent, Penang	Straits Settlements Police Force	
	1884	Assistant Superintendent, Penang	Straits Settlements Police Force	
	1889	Acting Superintendent, Malacca, Singapore, and Penang	Straits Settlements Police Force	
	1893	Assistant Superintendent, Province Wellesley	Straits Settlements Police Force	
	1897	Superintendent of Police, Malacca	Straits Settlements Police Force	
	1898	Acting Chief Police Officer, Singapore	Straits Settlements Police Force	
	?	Acting Inspector General of Police	Straits Settlements Police Force	
	1902	Superintendent of Police, Singapore	Straits Settlements Police Force	
	1906	Inspector General of the Straits Settlements Police	Straits Settlements Police Force	
