= Dunman Secondary School =

School in Tampines, Singapore

Coordinates: 1.36105°N 103.95593°E

- Sekolah Menengah Dunman 德明中学 டன்மன் உயர்நிலைப் பள்ளி

Location
- 21 Tampines Street 45, Singapore 529093; Singapore

Information
- Type: Autonomous Secondary, co-educational
- Motto: Pengetahuan Suloh Hidup (Malay); Knowledge – The Torch of Life
- Established: 1963; 63 years ago
- Session: single session
- School code: 3207
- Principal: Toh Thiam Chye
- Colour: Beige Brown White
- Nickname: Dunmanites
- Website: dunmansec.moe.edu.sg

Dunman Secondary School (DMN) is a co-educational government autonomous secondary school in Tampines, Singapore. It was founded in 1963.

== School history ==
=== Dunman Integrated Secondary School (1960s) ===
Dunman Secondary School was founded in 1963 as Dunman Integrated Secondary School, with Wong Yong Le as the first principal. The school was named after Thomas Dunman, the first police commissioner of Singapore who served from 1856 to 1871. It was the first integrated school in Singapore — an experiment to develop a common educational experience for children of different races and languages. Dunman Secondary Integrated School was situated at Haig Road and shared a large field with Dunman High School and Dunman Primary School.

Pupils were enrolled into the school even as the building was under construction. Nine English-stream secondary one classes were conducted at Matter West Vocational Institute while three Malay-stream secondary one classes were at Tun Seri Lanang school. Felix Chew and Abdul Kadir headed the respective schools. The completed school consisted of three buildings. The main building had four floors of airy classrooms and staff rooms. The science laboratories were in a shorter building opposite the main building. Next to the laboratories was a strip of garden where the science teachers grew plants used in the botany class. The school hall was one floor above the canteen.

=== Attainment of Autonomous Status ===
In 2000, in recognition of consistently strong academic results and co-curricular achievements, Dunman Secondary School was announced by the Ministry of Education to be accorded the status of an autonomous school in 2001. In the same year, the school received the Thinking Culture Award, Best School East Zone as well as the value-added award. Dunman Secondary School emerged as one of the five schools to receive the Singapore Quality Class in 2001, as one of the first schools in Singapore to receive the Award.

In 2002, the Dunman Life Sciences Training and Research Centre was launched by National Development Minister Mah Bow Tan. Dunman Secondary School received the prestigious Public Service Award for Organisation Excellence from SPRING, Singapore in 2006. It also received the Singapore Innovation Class and the Partner's Award.

In 2007, Dunman Secondary School received the School Distinction Award, Sustained Achievement Award for Academic Excellence, Character Development Award and National Education Award. It also received the East Zone and National Thinking Culture Award valid for two years from 2007. In the same year, Dunman Secondary School was selected for upgrading works under the Ministry of Education's Programme for Rebuilding and Improving Existing Schools (PRIME) from 2007 to 2009. Upgraded works include the school hall, which was expanded to double its capacity with air-conditioning systems installed, as well as a new indoor sports hall.

Dunman Secondary School celebrated its 50th anniversary in 2013.

== List of principals ==
Name of principal	Years served
Au Keng Chu	1963 - 1968
Tiong Dak Yu	1968–1971
Chiu Hock Seng	1971–1975
Poon Meng Seng	1975–1982
Janette Ho	1982–1985
Johnny Lau Hwa Park	1985–1989
Tay Sor Har	1989–1993
Tng Kim Guan	1993–1996
Chua Siew Eng	1996–1997
Gan Chin Huat	1997–2001
Edelweise Neo	2001–2009
Beatrice Chong	2010–2013
Suresh Balakrishnan	2014–2019
Toh Thiam Chye	2020–Present

== Identity and culture ==
The former school crest of Dunman Secondary School

=== School motto ===
The school motto "Pengetahuan Suloh Hidup" is in Malay and it means "Knowledge: The torch of life".

The motto was changed, for a short period, to Dare to achieve your dreams. The change was quickly reverted after an alumni protest in November 2008.

=== School crest ===
The original Dunman Secondary School crest was designed in 1963, consisting of a white lion with an open book bearing the school motto. Despite uproar from former students, the school crest was simplified after a review and rebranding exercise in 2007 to its current form.

=== School song ===
The school song, composed by John de Souza, was first sung in 1968. It expresses the purpose and mission of the school.

=== Alumni organisation ===
Dunman Secondary School's early day alumni began the organisation of the Dunman Sec Alumni (DSA) and was originally registered as a society. This organisation was later deregistered from Singapore Registry of Societies to begin of a more inclusive restructure, that merges the newer Dunman Youth Alumni (DYA) under one banner, in order to provide stronger support to current and former Dunmanites.

The new Dunman Youth Alumni also started an independent website to facilitate the organisation of alumni events such as the Alumni Reunion Dinner, in place of the former Dunman Sec Alumni defunct website.

== Campus ==
The Tan Yong Le Hall, the main hall of Dunman Secondary School, is a multi-purpose hall used for sports activities, assemblies as well as major examinations.

All secondary four and graduating classes study in air-conditioned classrooms while the rest of the students have fan-equipped classrooms. All students are provided with locker style tables to house their textbooks and school materials. Students are allowed to study anywhere in the school, which has more than 20 benches in the campus. The library is open for students to print, photocopy and use the computers/ iPads.

There are a total of fifteen computer, science and animation labs in the school.

== Academic information ==
As a government secondary school, Dunman Secondary School offers three academic streams, namely the four-year Express course(G3), as well as the Normal Course(G2), comprising the five-year Normal (Academic) course(G1), and the four-year Normal (Technical) course.

=== O Level Express Course ===
The Express Course is a nationwide four-year programme that leads up to the Singapore-Cambridge GCE Ordinary Level examination.

==== Academic subjects ====
The examinable academic subjects for Singapore-Cambridge GCE Ordinary Level offered by Dunman Secondary School for upper secondary level (via. streaming in secondary 2 level), as of 2017, are listed below.

Notes:

1. Subjects indicated with ' * ' are mandatory subjects.
2. All students in Singapore are required to undertake a Mother Tongue Language as an examinable subject, as indicated by ' ^ '.
3. "SPA" in Pure Science subjects refers to the incorporation of School-based Science Practical Assessment, which 20% of the subject result in the national examination are determined by school-based practical examinations, supervised by the Singapore Examinations and Assessment Board. The SPA Assessment has been replaced by one Practical Assessment in the 2018 O Levels.

Sciences	Language & Humanities	Arts & Aesthetics
Additional Mathematics*; Mathematics*; Physics (SPA); Chemistry (SPA)*; Biology (SPA); Science (Combined)	English Language*; English Literature; Mother Tongue Language* ^; Higher Mother Tongue Language; Chinese Literature; Geography; History; Combined Humanities (Social Studies & another Humanities subject at elective level)*	Art; Design & Technology; Food & Nutrition; Music

=== Normal Course ===
The Normal Course is a nationwide 4-year programme leading to the Singapore-Cambridge GCE Normal Level examination, which runs either the Normal (Academic) curriculum or Normal (Technical) curriculum, abbreviated as N(A) and N(T) respectively.

==== Normal (Academic) Course ====
In the Normal (Academic) course, students offer 5–8 subjects in the Singapore-Cambridge GCE Normal Level examination. Compulsory subjects include:

- English Language
- Mother Tongue Language
- Mathematics
- Combined Humanities

A 5th year leading to the Singapore-Cambridge GCE Ordinary Level examination is available to N(A) students who perform well in their Singapore-Cambridge GCE Normal Level examination. Students can move from one course to another based on their performance and the assessment of the school principal and teachers.

==== Normal (Technical) Course ====
The Normal (Technical) course prepares students for a technical-vocational education at the Institute of Technical Education. Students will offer 5–7 subjects in the Singapore-Cambridge GCE Normal Level examination. The curriculum is tailored towards strengthening students’ proficiency in English and Mathematics. Students take English Language, Mathematics, Basic Mother Tongue and Computer Applications as compulsory subjects.

== Notable alumni ==
- Amrin Amin: former Member of Parliament
- Theresa Goh: Paralympian
