= Commissioner of Police (Singapore) =

Top-ranking police officer of the Singapore Police Force

Commissioner of the Singapore Police Force
- Incumbent; How Kwang Hwee since 6 January 2026
- Singapore Police Force
- Type: Commissioner of Police
- Abbreviation: CP
- Reports to: Minister for Home Affairs
- Appointer: President of Singapore
- Term length: No term limit
- Constituting instrument: Cap. 235, 2006 Rev. Ed.
- Formation: 1857; 169 years ago
- First holder: Thomas Dunman
- Deputy: Deputy Commissioner of Police

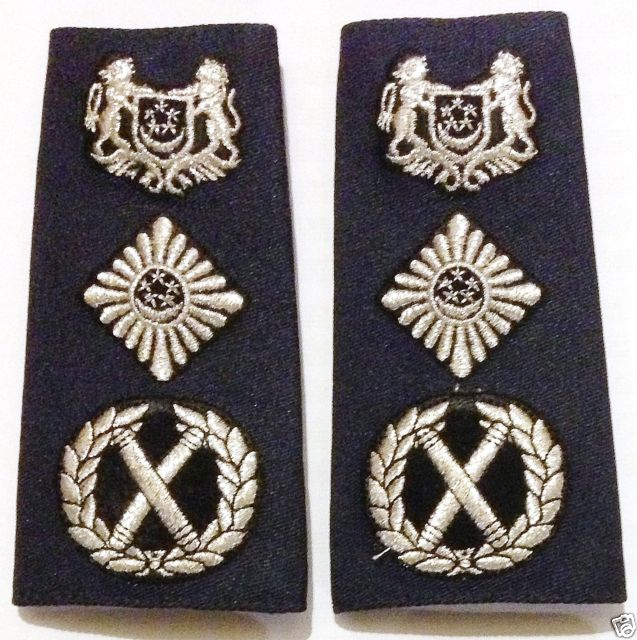
Commissioner of Police rank epaulettes

The Commissioner of Police is the head of the Singapore Police Force (SPF). The Commissioner is assisted by the Deputy Commissioner of Police, and reports to the Minister for Home Affairs. The current Commissioner of Police is How Kwang Hwee.

The position was created with the Police Act of 1856 (and passed in 1857), in response to calls for a full-time dedicated police officer to helm the police force in response to escalating cases of violent crime in Singapore during that period. Thomas Dunman was appointed as a Deputy Magistrate and Superintendent of Police in 1843, before he assumed responsibilities as the first full-time Commissioner of Police in June 1857.

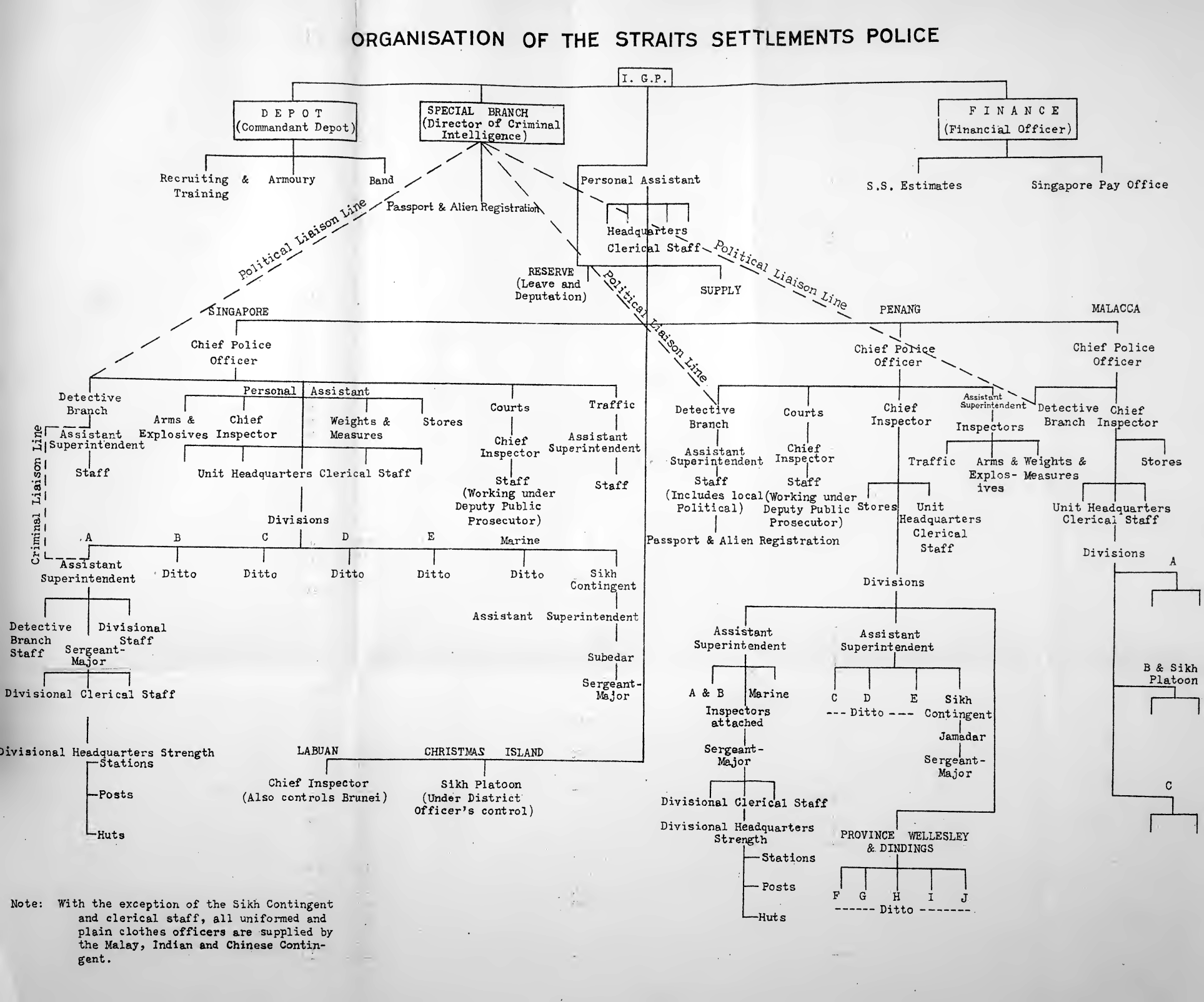
Organisational Chart of the Straits Settlements Police for the year 1931. The CPO for Singapore is found on the left.

When Singapore, Malacca and Penang became Crown colonies of the British Empire in 1867, joining the Straits Settlements, the Singapore Police Force was made one of the three primary components of the Straits Settlements Police Force (SSPF). While the capital city of the Straits Settlements was located in Singapore, and the SSPF maintained the office of Inspector-General of the Straits Settlements Police, the Singapore Police was led by a different commander known as the Chief Police Officer (CPO), who would usually, but not always, hold the rank of Superintendent of Police. There was a Chief Police Officer for each District of the Straits Settlements, and they reported directly to the Inspector General. They were responsible for the Chief Police Office, which acted as the headquarters of the Singapore Police Force. For a long period, the CPO also acted as the Registrar of Hackney Carriages, before the invention of automobiles.

CPO was a title, while Superintendent was a rank. The Police Force Ordinance of 1871 states clearly that the Chief Police Officer was the officer with the highest rank in the settlement, after the Inspector-General. The Police Force Ordinance of 1872 reiterated this. In the earlier years, there was only one Superintendent in Singapore, and they automatically filled the title of Chief Police Officer. This is iterated in The Prevention of Crime Ordinance 1880, (No. VI of 1880), where Singapore is defined as: "Singapore. The Superintendent of Police being the Chief Police Officer of this District..." and that the CPO's jurisdiction included Singapore Town and four Divisions of the District. In 1887, the High Court debated the definition of CPO, but the language was clarified by Attorney General Bosner.

As the city grew, by the 1930s, there were multiple Superintendents. In 1932, for example, the Blue Book lists two Superintendents, but one of them was in charge of Special Branch (the intelligence agency), while the other was in charge of the Police. By 1936, in the Settlement of over a million people, there were 6 Superintendents listed – the CPO was the most senior of those.

In March, 1940, the position of Chief Police Officer was eliminated, and the former CPO became known as the Deputy Inspector General of Police for Administration of the Straits Settlements, while simultaneously performing as CPO, managing the Singapore Police Force. Because of the wartime functions of the Inspector General, the Deputy Inspector General took administrative charge of all uniformed police forces in the Straits Settlements.

In 1900, quarters for the Chief Police Officer were erected on Fort Canning. In 1931, the Chief Police Office was moved from South Bridge Road to Robinson Road.

This lasted until the Japanese occupation of Singapore in 1942, before the position was restored as the Commissioner of Police in 1946 with the return of the British and the gradual instatement of self-governance.

The President of Singapore has the power to appoint the Commissioner of Police on the advice of the Cabinet.

== List of commissioners of police ==
=== Singapore in the Straits Settlements ===
==== Superintendent of the Singapore Police Force ====
#	Portrait	Commissioner of Police	Took office	Left office	Ref.
1		Thomas Dunman	1846	1856	

=== Commissioners of the Singapore Police Force ===
#	Portrait	Commissioner of Police	Took office	Left office	Ref.
1		Henry Somerset Mackenzie, as Resident Councillor of Singapore	1856	1857	
2		Thomas Dunman	1857	1861	
–		Bruce Robertson	1861	1862	
2		Thomas Dunman	1862	18 August 1871	
3		Charles Bushe Plunket	18 August 1871	Promoted to Inspector-General	

=== Chief Police Officers of the Singapore Police District ===
The Chief Police Officer did not have to be a Superintendent, simply the highest-ranking officer in the Settlement after the IG. Many of the CPOs were Assistant Superintendents or Second Superintendents, but usually were promoted to "Acting Superintendent" to avoid confusion. Rotations between the Settlements were very common; CPOs served at the discretion of the government, and often had to sail to another Settlement to fill-in for someone else who was going on leave or was out sick, or to obtain promotions for themselves. After stressful postings, CPOs were also often given lengthy leave to go back to England, and while there, they could often receive modernized training at Scotland Yard.

#	Portrait	Chief Police Officer	Took office	Left office	Ref.
1		Charles Brown Waller	Promoted from Deputy Commissioner	26 April 1872	
		Robert Walter Maxwell	26 April 1872	13 August 1872	
		Charles Brown Waller	13 August 1872	17 December 1872	
		Samuel Dunlop	17 December 1872	26 December 1872	
–		Henry Patrick Coghill Plunket	26 December 1872	17 July 1873	
–		Walter John Tatham	17 July 1873	1873	
		Robert Walter Maxwell (WIA)	4 December 1873	1 October 1877	
–		Cranston Erasmus Ommaney	26 December 1877	19 April 1878	
–		Arthur Phillip Talbot	25 June 1878	5 July 1879	
–		Herbert Jackson Harmer Riccard	24 July 1879	25 March 1881	
		Cranston Erasmus Ommaney	25 March 1881	9 September 1882 #	
		Herbert Jackson Harmer Riccard	9 September 1882	16 January 1883	
–		Harry Osman Newland	6 September 1883	3 November 1884	
		Edward Horatio Bell	22 October 1884	4 April 1889	
–		William Andrew Cuscaden	4 April 1889	4 May 1889	
–		Harry Osman Newland	4 May 1889	1 August 1890	
–		Edward C. Hogge	1 August 1890	30 December 1890	
–		William Andrew Cuscaden	9 February 1891	7 January 1892	
–		Harry Osman Newland	7 January 1892	4 April 1893	
		Edward Horatio Bell	4 April 1893	19 April 1894	
–		Harry Osman Newland	19 April 1894	1894	
–		Edward Horatio Bell	25 April 1895	1 April 1898	
–		William Andrew Cuscaden	1 April 1898	8 March 1901	
–		Alan Lindsay Stewart	8 March 1901	27 December 1901	
–		Charles Trevelyan Wathen	27 December 1901	30 August 1902	
–		William Edward Ure Grove	30 August 1902	6 September 1903	
–		Edward Archibald Gardiner	19 September 1903	6 December 1903	
		William Andrew Cuscaden	6 December 1903	16 March 1904	
		Edward Archibald Gardiner	16 March 1904	18 March 1904	
		William Andrew Cuscaden	18 March 1904	27 September 1906	
–		Jermyn d’Arcy Travers Symonds	27 September 1906	14 December 1906	
–		Wilfred Robert John Hawtrey	14 December 1906	February 1907	
		William Edward Ure Grove	February 1907	September 1907	
		Alexander Richard Chancellor	12 September 1907	20 November 1908	
–		Edward Archibald Gardiner	20 November 1908	25 February 1910	
		Alexander Richard Chancellor	25 February 1910	23 July 1910	
–		Edward Archibald Gardiner	30 July 1910	6 December 1910	
–		Charles Basil Whitehead	6 December 1910	23 December 1910	
		William Andrew Cuscaden (Temporarily, as Inspector General)	23 December 1910	18 February 1911	
		William Montagu Lance Bower	18 February 1911	21 September 1911	
		Alexander Richard Chancellor	21 September 1911	3 March 1914	
		George Herbert May	3 March 1914	June 1916	
–		Arthur Robert Johnstone Dewar	30 June 1916	21 August 1916	
		Charles Hannigan	21 August 1916	1 May 1920	
–		Nevil Alfred Malcolm Griffin	1 May 1920	28 October 1920	
		Andrew Joseph Sheedy (Not to be confused with Andrew Francis Sheedy)	28 October 1920	16 November 1920	
		Nevil Alfred Malcolm Griffin	16 November 1920	1 April 1921	
		Andrew Joseph Sheedy	1 April 1921	15 April 1921	
		Victor George Savi	15 April 1921	21 March 1922	
		Charles Hannigan	21 March 1922	28 December 1922	
–		Andrew Joseph Sheedy	28 December 1922	6 January 1923	
–		William Montagu Lance Bower	6 January 1923	April 1923	
		Charles Hannigan	April 1923	10 February 1925	
		Francis Edward Harmer	10 February 1925	10 April 1925	
		Harold Fairburn	10 April 1925	1 July 1925	
–		Andrew Joseph Sheedy	1 July 1925	1 November 1925	
		Charles Henry Sansom	7 November 1925	1 December 1925	
–		René H de S Onraet	3 December 1925	11 October 1926	
		Charles Henry Sansom	11 October 1926	16 August 1928	
–		Andrew Joseph Sheedy	23 August 1928	21 December 1929	
		Charles Henry Sansom	21 December 1929	1 May 1930	
–		Victor George Savi	1 May 1930	11 June 1931	
–		René H de S Onraet	11 June 1931	28 January 1932	
		Victor George Savi	28 January 1932	20 June 1934	
–		Hugh Lambert Mitchell	2 September 1934	12 November 1934	
–		René H de S Onraet	12 November 1934	7 March 1935	
		Nevil Alfred Malcolm Griffin	7 March 1935	8 June 1936	
–		Mervyn Llewelyn Wynne	8 June 1936	16 June 1938	
–		John Pennefather Pennefather Evans	16 June 1938	2 July 1938	
		Ewald Egerton Herbert Beck	2 July 1938	January 1939	
		L. A. Thomas	January 1939	1940	

=== Deputy Inspector General for Administration of the Straits Settlements and Chief Police Officer of Singapore ===
#	Portrait	Deputy I.G., Administration	Took office	Left office	Ref.
		L. A. Thomas	1940	?	

=== Commissioner of the Singapore Police Force ===
British Military Administration Civil Affairs Police Force
#	Portrait	Commissioner of Police	Took office	Left office
		Robert Edward Foulger	1945	1946
Colony of Singapore
#	Portrait	Commissioner of Police	Took office	Left office
1		Robert Edward Foulger	1946	1951
2		J. P. Pennefather-Evans	1951	1952
3		Nigel G Morris	1952	1957
4		Alan Edmund Grove Blades	1957	21 March 1963
State of Singapore
#	Portrait	Commissioner of Police	Took office	Left office
5		John Le Cain	21 March 1963	1965
Singapore
#	Portrait	Commissioner of Police	Took office	Left office
5		John Le Cain	1965	1967
6		Cheam Kim Seang	1967	1972
7		Tan Teck Khim	1973	1981
8		Goh Yong Hong	1981	1992
9		Tee Tua Ba	1992	1997
10		Khoo Boon Hui	1997	2010
11		Ng Joo Hee	2010	2015
12		Hoong Wee Teck	2015	2026
13		How Kwang Hwee	2026	Incumbent
