= Robert Edward Foulger =

British colonial police officer (1899–1969)

Robert Edward Foulger CMG KFSM
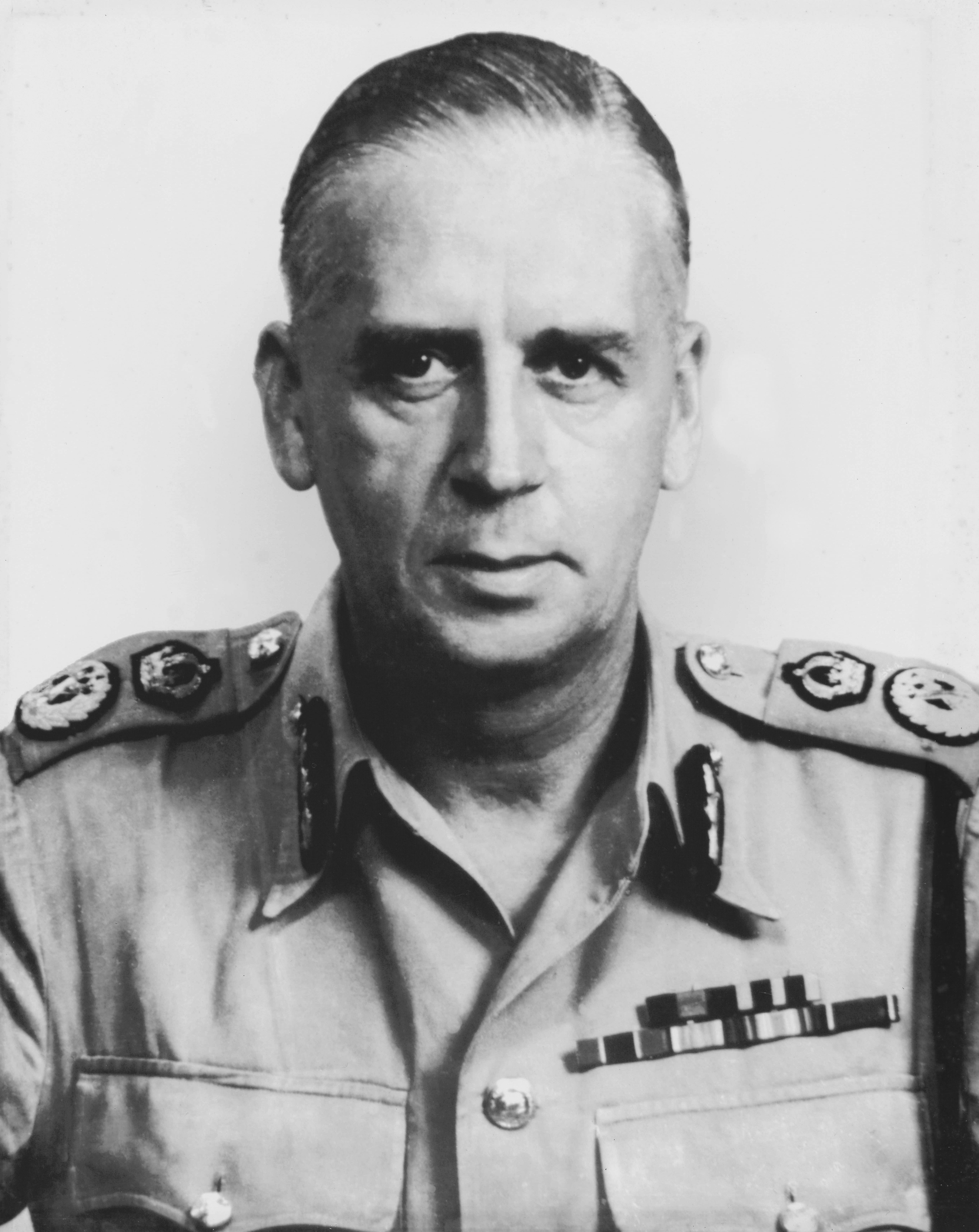
- Born: 21 May 1899; London
- Died: 6 March 1969 (aged 69)
- Education: Pembroke College, Cambridge
- Occupation: Senior colonial police officer

Robert Edward Foulger (21 May 1899 – 6 March 1969) was a senior British colonial police officer. He was Commissioner of the Singapore Police Force and Tanganyika.

== Early life and education ==
Foulger was born in London on 21 May 1899, the youngest son of H. Foulger, solicitor. He was educated at Wellington College and Pembroke College, Cambridge.

== Career ==
Foulger served in the Coldstream Guards in 1919. In the following year, he joined the Straits Settlements Police Force as a police probationer, and served for two years as a police officer. From 1923 to 1939, he served with the Nigerian police force, and from 1939 to 1942 was Deputy Commissioner of the Gold Coast police force. In 1942, he returned to Nigeria as Deputy Commissioner remaining in the post until 1945.

Foulger returned to Malaya on his second tour of duty on 5 September 1945 as Commissioner of Police of Singapore during the British Military Administration, taking over as head of the colony's police force from the Japanese. He was faced with two of biggest tasks confronting the colony in the post-War period: resurrecting the police force and tackling the worst crime era in Singapore's history. He found that the police had "deteriorated almost beyond recognition and had sunk equally low in the estimation of the people", lacking uniforms, underfed and with their morale broken. Throughout the whole period of the British Military Administration, he worked to renew the police force and within a year improved efficiency and restored the esprit de corps before the Civil government took over in 1946. With armed gangs operating all over the colony, he succeeded in restoring law and order with the aid of army officers and new volunteer constables, personally conducting raids on their headquarters.

After five years of service he left Singapore for England in November 1950, having been offered the post of Police Adviser to the Secretary of State for the Colonies in London. During the following month after a commission, established in Singapore to investigate serious disorder known as the Maria Hertogh riots in which 18 people were killed, found that the police command was at fault, Foulger, who testified at the enquiry, had his job offer in London terminated, and accepted the relatively minor posting of Commissioner of Police, Tanganyika.

== Personal life and death ==
Foulger married Beatrice Slater (MBE), daughter of Sir Ransford Slater in 1931. There were no children of the marriage.

Foulger died on 6 March 1969, aged 69.

== Honours ==
Foulger was appointed Companion of the Order of St Michael and St George (CMG) in the 1947 New Year Honours. In the 1942 Birthday Honours he was awarded the Colonial Police Medal (CPM).
