= Straits Settlements Police Force =

Police force of the British colony of the Straits Settlements

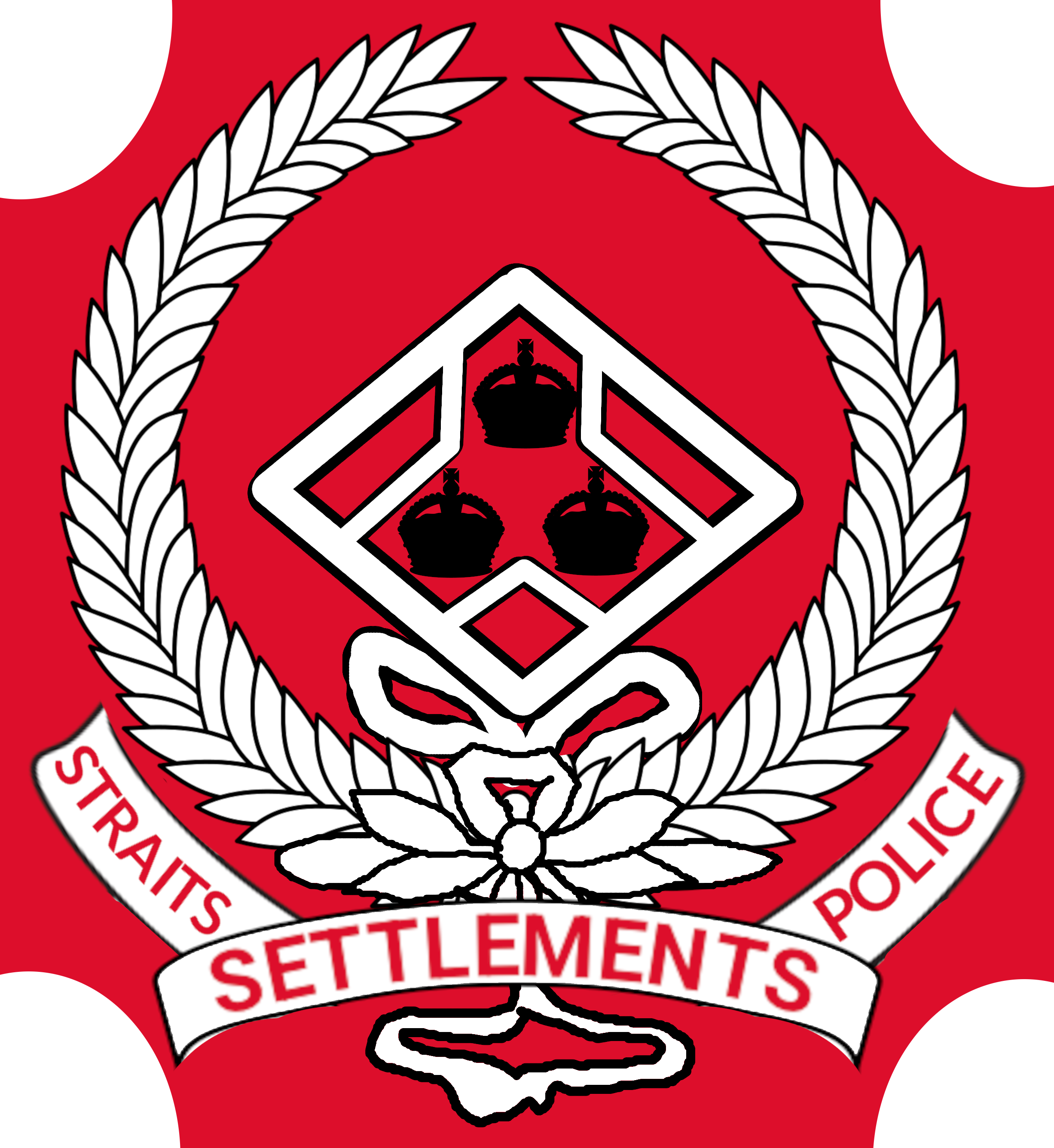
- The three crowns of the Crest of the Straits Settlements represent the 3 first settlements; Malacca, Penang, and Singapore.

Agency overview
- Formed: 1872
- Dissolved: 15 February 1942
- Superseding agency: Kempeitai; Civil Affairs Police Force; Federation of Malaya Police

Jurisdictional structure
- Operations jurisdiction: Straits Settlements; British Singapore; Malacca; Penang; Penang Island; Province Wellesley; Dindings (1874–1935); Pangkor Island; Christmas Island (1898–1942); Brunei (1906–1921); Labuan (1907–1942)
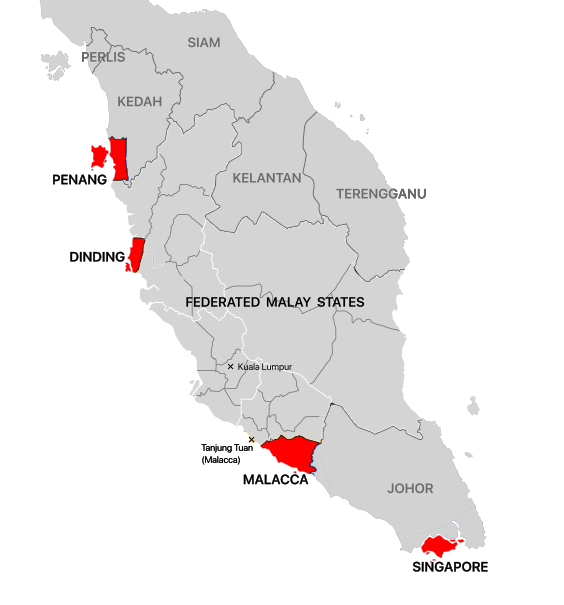
- Not seen in map: Christmas Island

Operational structure
- Headquarters: Singapore
- Agency executives: Inspector General; Chief Police Officer
- Parent agency: Colonial Police Service (1936–1942)
- Child agencies: Singapore Police; Penang Police; Malacca Police; Province Wellesley Police; Labuan Police; Brunei Police

The Straits Settlements Police Force (SSPF), the Straits Settlements Police (SSP), or the Straits Police, was the federal police agency for the Straits Settlements. It oversaw the police of Singapore, Penang Island, Province Wellesley, and Malacca. At certain periods, it also policed the Dindings, Pangkor Island, the Crown Colony of Labuan, Christmas Island, and Brunei. The Straits Police did not, however, have any police in the Cocos (Keeling) Islands. The SSPF collapsed in 1942 with the Japanese invasion of Malaya. After the war, the former SSPF resources were absorbed by the Civil Affairs Police Force. SSPF is a predecessor of the Singapore Police Force, the Royal Brunei Police Force, and the Royal Malaysia Police.

== Origins ==
=== Policing in the Straits prior to 1872 ===
Police forces existed in the Straits and the Malay Peninsula long before the establishment of the Straits Settlements. The Malacca Sultanate had possessed a centralized police system administered by a collection of Temenggong. Under the Temenggong, Penghulu enforced security in their villages and towns. On 10 August 1511, Afonso de Albuquerque landed in Malacca, and during the reign of Portuguese Malacca, a different system was established under the military. In the 16th Century, the Portuguese established the Kapitan Administration. On 16 January 1641, Dutch Malacca replaced Portuguese rule, and they eventually introduced the Malacca Burgher Guard. In 1795, as Holland was threatened with invasion during the Napoleonic Wars, William V, Prince of Orange fled to England and issued the Kew Letters, after which, the British Empire secured a presence in Malacca. However, British Malacca was not established until 1826, when the Dutch officially surrendered the territory.

After the establishment of Prince of Wales Island (also known as Penang), that British possession had no centralized system of law and order there outside of the military. The First Charter of Justice was signed on 25 March 1807 by King George III. With the Charter of Justice, the first "modern" police force in the region was established. That charter, however, only applied to Prince of Wales Island, and did not extend beyond it.

The Singapore Police Force had been established in 1820, only a year after the establishment of British Singapore by Sir Stamford Raffles.

=== Early Straits Settlements (1826–1872) ===
In 1826, Penang, Malacca, and Singapore were united as the Presidency of the Straits Settlements. With the new Presidency established, on 27 November 1826, King George IV issued the Second Charter of Justice to allow for law and order administration outside of Penang Island, with the official document arriving by sailboat in the Straits in 1827. Under the new system, the Settlements each had their own police forces overseen by their Resident Councillors. They were small forces and often considered inadequate to meet the needs of their communities.

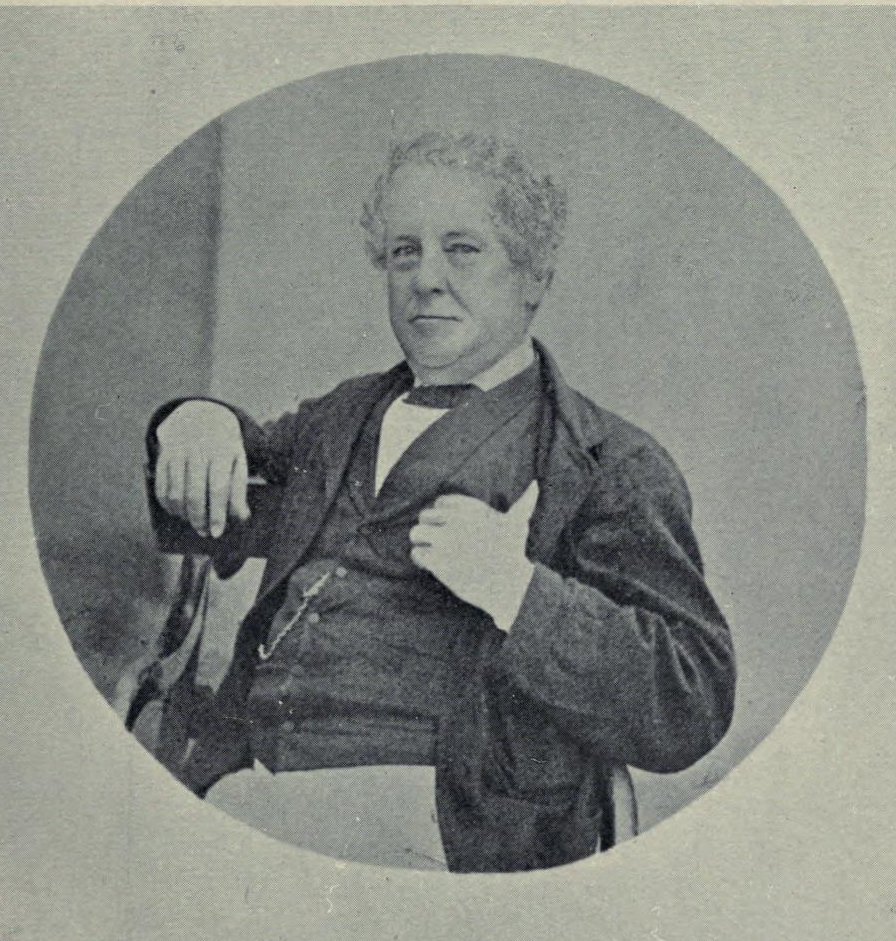
Thomas Dunman was made Superintendent of the Singapore Police in 1846. Ten years later, his counterparts were established in the Penang and Malacca police.

In 1830, the Presidency was downgraded to Residency status and became the Residency of the Straits Settlements, and the justice system broke down; every court in the Straits was closed, ushering in a wave of unsolved crime. Singapore was considered the worst of the Settlements in crime, compounded by the fact that the Dutch East Indies exiled many of their criminals to Singapore. In 1846, while Governor Butterworth was visiting Penang Island, the Justices of the Peace superseded his authority and appointed Thomas Dunman as the Superintendent of Police for Singapore.

Governor Butterworth issued the Bill To Provide for the Appointment of Constables and Peace Officers at the Settlements in the Straits, which was read by the Council of Calcutta in September 1846. In 1847, the bill was ratified as Act III of 1847.

In April 1846, at George Town, Penang, the capitol of that province and former capitol of the Straits Settlements, corruption in the police had forced the public to hold a meeting and demand the creation of a Deputy Superintendent of Police for Penang. Governor Butterworth refused.

=== Police Act of 1856 and the first Commissioners of Police ===
In 1856, the Legislative Council of India debated the Police Bill of 1856. Chief Justice James William Colvile and Barnes Peacock greatly discussed whether Resident Councilors should or should not hold the powers of the judiciary, police, and executive, and that police commissioners should be created for each of the Straits. Governor Blundell objected to their opinion, but they overruled him, and for the first time, the office of "police commissioner" was established for the control over independent and unique police forces at each of the Settlements.

The Resident Councilors, however, were simply given the lateral title of Commissioner of Police in their Settlements; Henry Somerset Mackenzie for Singapore, Henry Stuart Man for Malacca, and William Thomas Lewis for Penang. Bruce Robertson was appointed as the first Deputy Commissioner of Police for Penang, and he was also made responsible for the system of justice overseen by the Penghulus of Province Wellesley. The first Deputy Commissioner of Police for Malacca was George Cox. George Wahab was appointed Deputy Commissioner for Singapore.

In 1857, Thomas Dunman replaced Mackenzie, and became the first independent Commissioner of Police for Singapore.

In this early era, police officers and peons were overworked and underpaid, as were their superior officers. Thomas Dunnman was the only superior in the Settlements to have secured a decent salary; his counterparts in Malacca and Penang, the Deputy Commissioners, were both so underpaid that they were even separately accused of accepting bribes. Bruce Robertson, who had served in Penang until 1860, when he was made Acting Commissioner of police in Singapore in 1861, suffered a major breakdown in health in 1862.

The historian C. M. Turnbull writes that, in this era; "It was easy to dump corpses in the jungle or the sea, and even in the middle of town murderers could bury victims in public cemeteries in broad daylight because no funeral records were kept." In 1864, the arrival of gas lighting did alleviate some crime, but it was still unmatched by the police. Merchants took to the practice of hiring private security, instead of relying on the police.

Governor Cavenagh did much to build-out the police forces of the Straits; he established the first police stations on the Singapore side of the Straits of Johor, established frontier outposts in Malacca, created the Marine Police, and embedded tribal headmen into secret societies to spy on them.

In 1867, British Bengal rule in the Straits was ended, and the Straits Settlements were made a Crown Colony.

=== Establishment of the Straits Settlements Police Force (1872) ===
The Police Force Ordinance of 1872 merged the formerly independent police forces of Penang, Malacca, and Singapore, conglomerating them under the new federalized and centralized police force for the new Crown Colony of the Straits Settlements. Through the merger, those former police forces were downgraded from fully-fledged police forces to territorial police units within the structure of the Straits Settlements Police Force.

SSPF itself was created in response to the need for a centralized command structure to combat Chinese secret societies in the region, so that each state of the Straits Settlements could have the same access to criminal intelligence reports and profiles on those criminals. In almost every Colonial Annual Report published by the Straits Settlements, a section or chapter was dedicated to the police efforts on suppressing these secret societies.

For the first time in the whole of Malaya, the duties of a police officer were officially defined in the Police Force Ordinance.

== Composition ==
=== Sikh Contingent ===
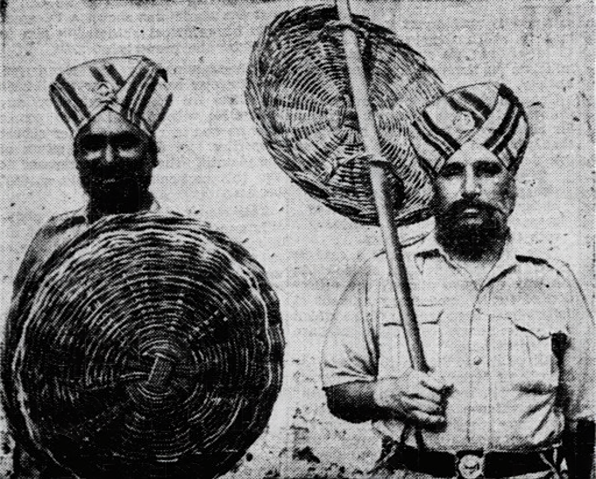
In the early days, Shock Trooper members of the Sikh Contingent of the Straits Settlements Police Force were issued a "riot shield" made of rattan.

In 1879, the Straits Police established a Commission of Inquiry to determine whether the force should be bolstered by a Sikh Contingent, and several British officers who had formerly served with Sikhs in Punjab stated their opinion that the colony could benefit from this. After it was agreed to form the Contingent, volunteers were accepted from Punjab.

One of the first volunteers was Assistant Superintendent Stevens, formerly a member of the Indian Police Force. On 26 March 1881, Stevens arrived in Singapore as the first Officer in Charge of the Sikh Contingent of the Straits Settlements Police. He brought with him 54 Sikhs that would become his first officers and constabulary. For the remainder of the year, they built-out the structure of the Contingent.

The Sikh Contingent was officially constituted in November 1881, with a strength of 165 Sikhs. Back home, in Punjab, the Contingent gained a quick reputation as an honorable and viable career path for Sikh recruits. Only nine years after the Sikh Contingent had been established, Samuel Dunlop stated that they were: "the best and most satisfactory contingent in the force."

Official records of the Straits Police state that they were the SSPF's "shock troops," or quick reaction force, ready at a moment's notice to be deployed to anywhere in the colony as heavy reinforcements to beleaguered police. They slept in separate barracks from the other members of the force, and reported directly to the Officer in Charge (OIC) of the Sikh Contingent, whose headquarters were in Singapore. The Sikh Contingent OIC reported directly to the Inspector General of Police.

The Sikh OIC determined their training, organisation, and duties, as per the needs of the Chief Police Officer of each Settlement. If they were not needed for "barracks work," they were often assigned as personal bodyguards and escorts for high-ranking government officials and in various government departments.

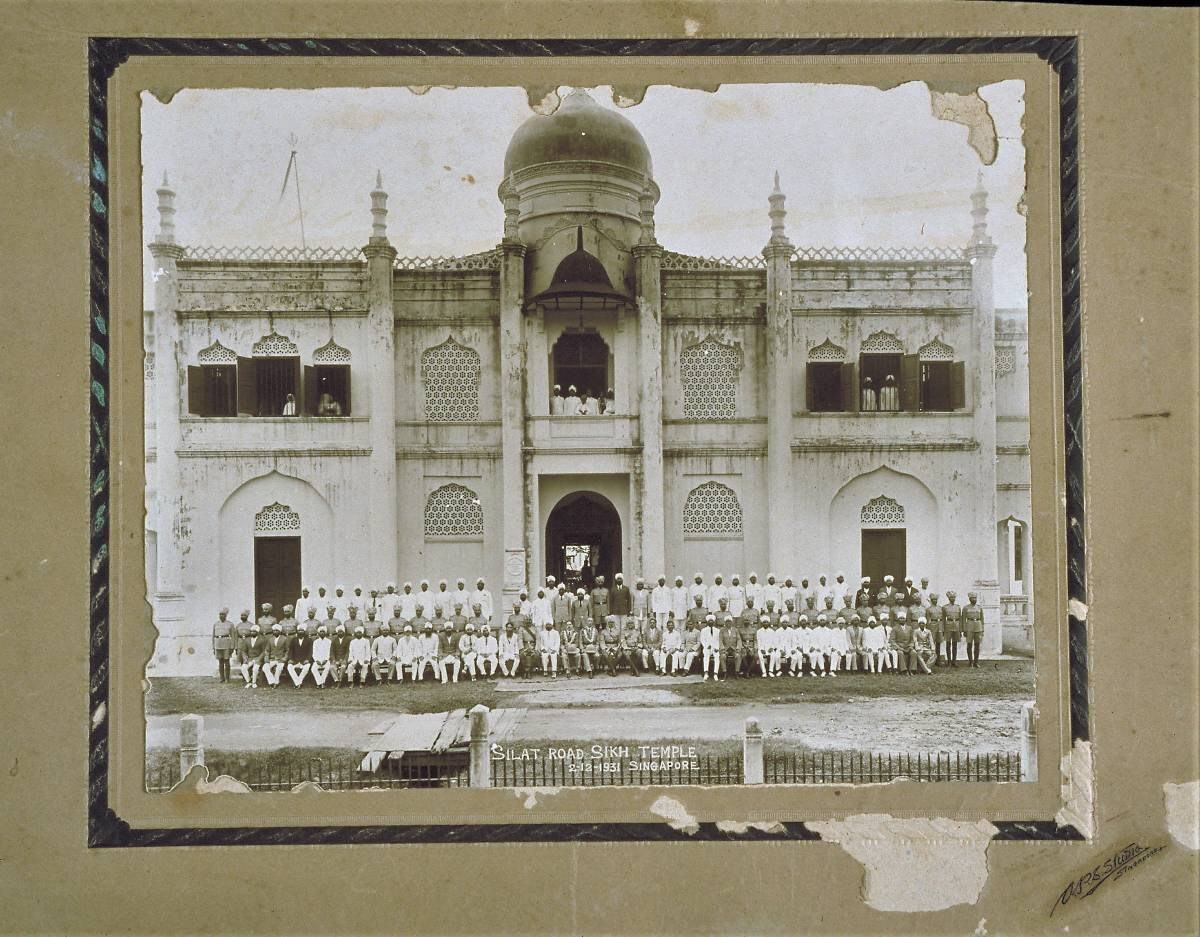
Members of the Sikh Contingent in front of Gurdwara Sahib Silat Road in 1931.

Initial recruits at Singapore were expected to be at least 175cm tall (5 foot 7 inches). After swearing their oaths at the Magistrate's office, they were baptized at the Sikh Contingent Gurdwara. Sikh Contingent members were not allowed to shave, and were expected to wear their turbans as part of their official uniform – British officers during inspection would grade them according to these standards.

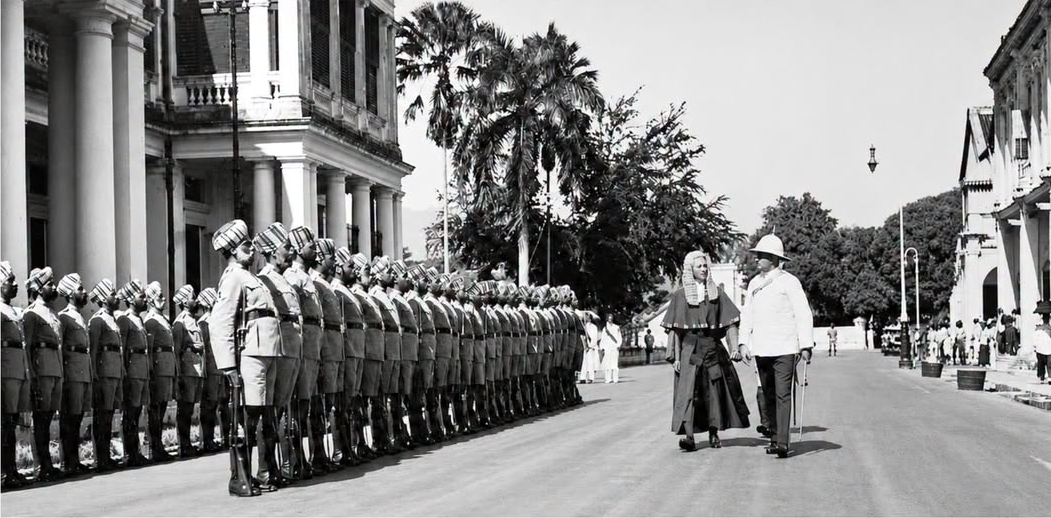
Members of the Sikh Police Contingent stand as an Honour Guard for the Penang Court.

The first Gurdwara in Singapore, simply known as the Police Gurdwara, was at the Pearl's Hill Barracks. It was the first Gurdwara ever built in Singapore. The government appointed a Granthi to serve with the Contingent. In time, civilians were allowed into the Temple, and the Granthi oversaw the religious education of their youth. After the First World War, the Sikh Contingent built a new, larger Gurdwara on Silat Road. Inspector General Alexander Richard Chancellor laid its foundation stone on 18 December 1922.

At Penang, the first Gurdwara was erected in 1899, with the Chief Police Officer at the time, E. A. Gardner, serving as the first President of the Gurdwara.

Like in many other places in the British Empire, the Sikhs of the Straits Police were often the first Sikhs to settle in the communities policed by them, being the founders of successive generations of Sikhs.

In 1936, there were 359 members of the Sikh Contingent stationed in Singapore (15% of Singapore's total police), 110 in Penang (12%), 36 in Malacca (10%), and 31 on Christmas Island (100%).

The Sikh Contingent was disbanded with the fall of Singapore, and was not re-instated in the reconstructed Singapore Police Force after the war.

== Organisation ==
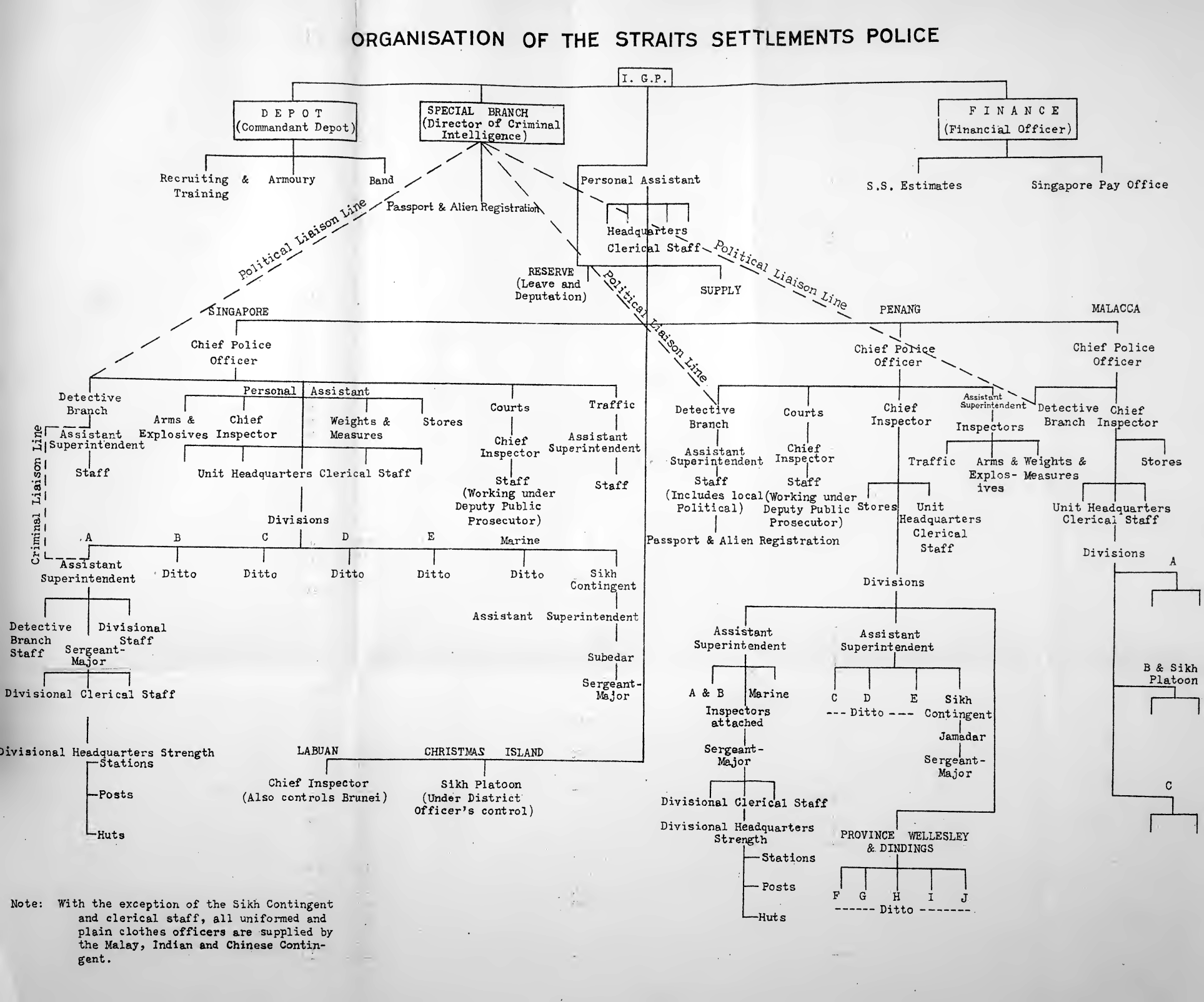
Organisational Chart of the Straits Settlements Police for the year 1931

The Straits Settlements Police Force was commanded by the Inspector General of the Straits Settlements Police Force. The first Inspector General of the SSPF was Charles Bushe Plunket, who in 1875 went to fight in the Perak War. SSPF Headquarters were in Singapore, the capital city, largest in population, and most economically important state of the Straits Settlements.

In 1904, the "probationer system" was introduced. Prior to this, all gazetted officers were appointed by the Colonial Office. After this, potential commissioned officers needed to take exams and work a probationary period prior to their official assignments. In Singapore, especially, probationers were sent to China to study Chinese languages and Chinese secret societies. The first Chinese translators were hired into the Criminal Investigation Department and the Detective Branch in 1928.

When police members joined the SSPF, they were enrolled to serve any Settlement of the colony. However, at the request of the Governor, they could be placed into the service of "any Malay State," including the Federated and Unfederated Malay States.

=== Sports ===
SSPF had an Inter-Settlement Police Sports League. The Settlements also competed with the other Malay States. Penang Police held rivalries with Kedah State Police in the Clayton Cup, and with the Perak Police in the Mitchell Cup.

=== Branches ===
==== Detective Branches ====
Each Settlement had its own Detective Branch or Detective Department, reporting to the Chief Police Officer of that Settlement. Before 1893, the Detective Branches were under a Chief Detective Inspector. After 1893, they reported to an Assistant Superintendent. The first Assistant Superintendent in charge of the Singapore Detective Branch was A. L. Stewart. The first for Penang was Captain Falkner.

==== Criminal Registration Department ====
In 1901, the Criminal Registration Department was created to track and identify criminals. The Registrar of Criminals at Kuala Lumpur, in the Federated Malay States Police, was in charge of the Finger-Print Bureau for the entire Malay Peninsula, including the SSPF and the police forces of the Unfederated Malay States. The Finger-print Bureau deployed the Conlay System for fingerprint identification, initiated by William Lance Conlay, considering the Henry System to be inadequate and exhaustive.

==== Criminal Intelligence Department / Special Branch ====
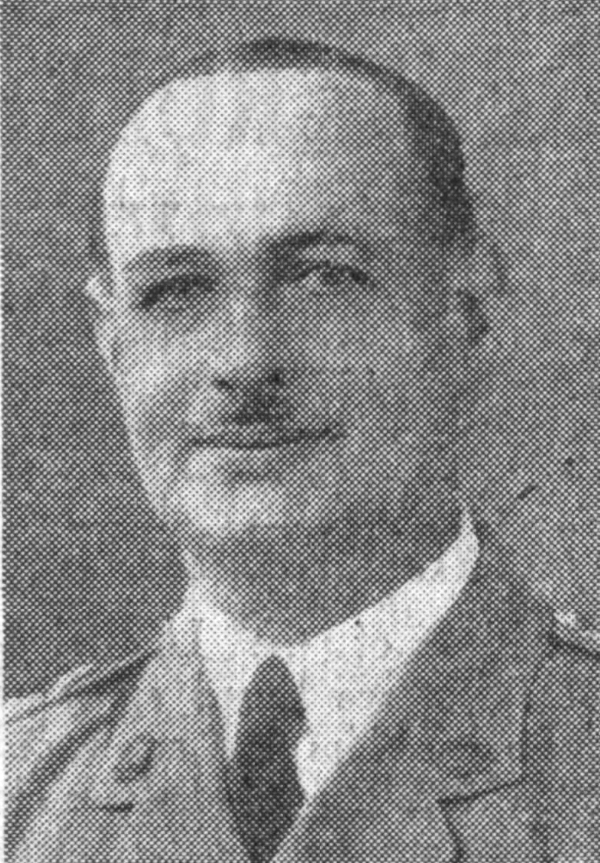
Victor George Savi was the first Director of CID. Later, he served as Chief Police Officer, Singapore, and in 1935, became the Police Chief for Fife.

In 1915, the Sepoy Mutiny was followed soon after by a labor dispute within the Malay States Guides who refused to serve overseas, and later the Kelantan Rebellion. Anti-colonial nationalist revolutions and rebellions were fomenting throughout the British Empire and sphere of influence in Asia. In 1918, in response to these regional emergencies, the SSPF created the Criminal Intelligence Department (CID).

CID was headquartered in Singapore, and its director reported directly to the Inspector General, independent of Singapore's CPO. The first Director of CID was Victor George Savi. The second was René H de S Onraet. CID investigators were brought to Malaya from all over the British Empire. Under the authority of the Inspector General, Special Branch could issue orders to any of the Chief Police Officers of the Straits. It held constant communication with diplomats and counterpart bureaus and branches in the region.

In 1925, CID was renamed Criminal Intelligence, Special Branch.

In 1932, the Malayan Bureau of Political Intelligence was abolished by Hugh Clifford, and its functions were absorbed by CID, still under the command of René Oranet. As a result of CID, Special Branch's new additional political intelligence functions, it changed its name simply to Special Branch that year.

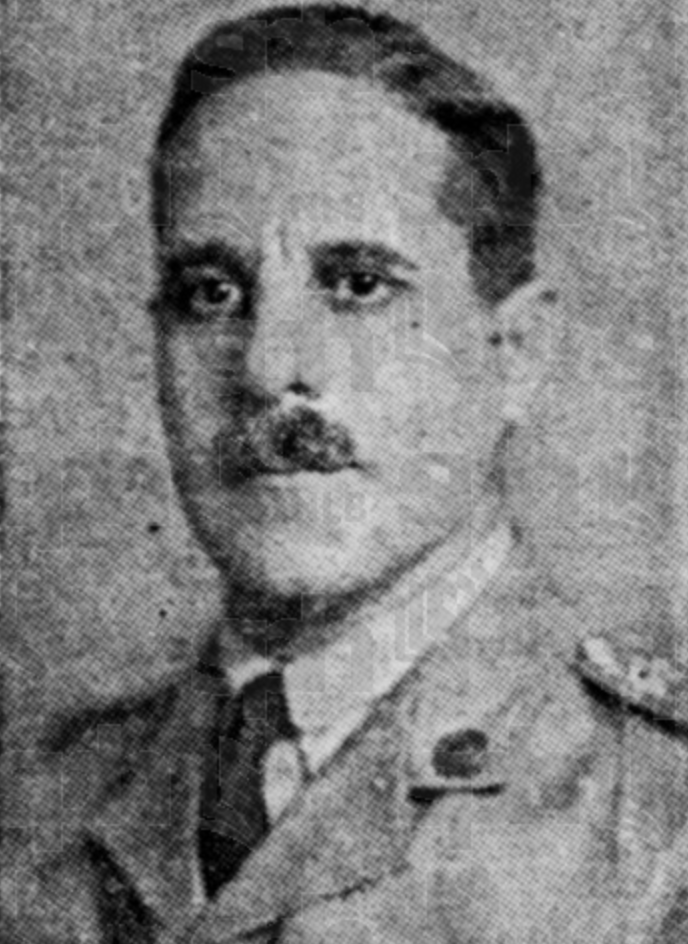
René Onraet was the second Director of CID, and was serving in this capacity when it changed its name to Special Branch.

In this era, there was a noticeable shift toward suppressing Communism in the Straits Settlements, especially as the Malayan Communist Party had been created around this time. In Colonial Annual Reports, the Chinese communists were often labeled by the government as "Chinese Communist secret societies." Special Branch was primarily an espionage and intelligence unit, and in his 1936 Annual Report, then-Inspector General Oranet wrote that Special Branch was: "...the central investigating and recording machine of the type with which it is designed to deal," and did not elaborate any further.

Outside of its liaisons with the Criminal Intelligence Branch (CIB) of the Federated Malay States Police, and the Detective Branches of the Unfederated Malay States, Special Branch also maintained intelligence sharing networks with their counterparts in the Dutch Empire and the Politieke Inlichtingendienst in the Dutch East Indies, the Criminal Intelligence Branches of the Hong Kong Police Force and the Burma Police Force, India's Intelligence Bureau, the Sûreté générale indochinoise of French Indochina, and the Philippine Constabulary of the American Philippines.

In the 1930s, Special Branch was organised into five sections; Anti-Communist Section, Japanese Section, Security Section, Political Section, and the Aliens Section. The largest section with the biggest budget was the Anti-Communist Section.

At the outset of the Second World War in 1939, Inspector General Arthur Harold Dickinson established the Malayan Security Service (MSS) as a branch of government outside of the police and appointed John Dally as its first director. This was a pan-Malayan unit, overseeing the intelligence apparatus of all of the Malayan States.

==== Police Training Depot ====
The Police Training Depot was in Singapore. The Chief Police Officers of Penang and Malacca were allowed to select their own recruits and plain clothes detectives.

==== Financial Branch ====
The Financial Branch was headquartered in Singapore.

==== Traffic Branch ====
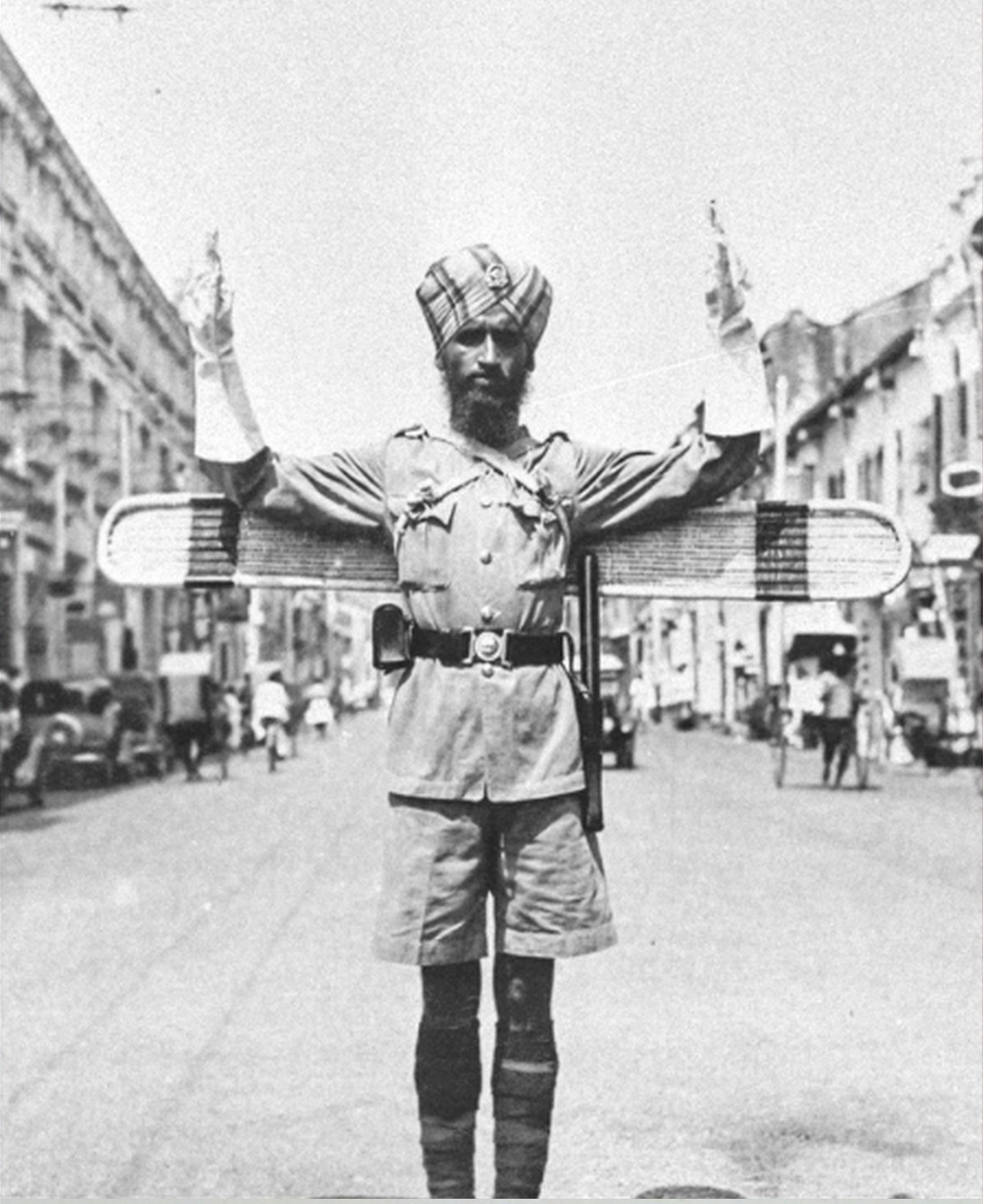
A member of the Sikh Contingent wears his "wings" on traffic duty in Singapore in the 1930s. Traffic wings were worn here from 1926 until just before World War II.

With the invention of motor vehicles, SSPF officers quickly adapted and traffic branches were created.

==== Administration (1940–1942) ====
In March, 1940, the position of Chief Police Officer for Singapore was eliminated, and the former Singapore CPO became known as the Deputy Inspector General of Police, Administration, while simultaneously performing the duties of CPO. Because of the wartime functions of the Inspector General, the Deputy Inspector General took administrative charge of all uniformed police forces in the Straits Settlements.

==== Crime and Political Branch (政 治 部) (1940–1942) ====
In 1940, the Crime and Political Branch was created, and Lloyd Wynne was appointed Deputy Inspector General, CPB.

== Settlements and territories ==
The commanding officer in charge of a Settlement's police was known as the Chief Police Officer (CPO) of that Settlement. Under each CPO were territorial divisions and departmental branches overseen by gazetted officers. The CPO oversaw the Chief Police Office within a Settlement's Central Police Station, the headquarters of the Settlement's police unit.

There was no police presence in the Cocos (Keeling) Islands, despite the fact that it had joined the Straits Settlements in 1886. An article which appeared in the Levin Daily Chronicle in 1928 states that: "The islanders are happy and healthy; there are no tax collectors and no police." The administration of law and order in those islands was the Clunies-Ross family, and only periodically would a government officer be sent out from Christmas Island to inspect the territory.

In the 1880s the Penghulu system was still operative in several places, but it was most intricately employed in Malacca.

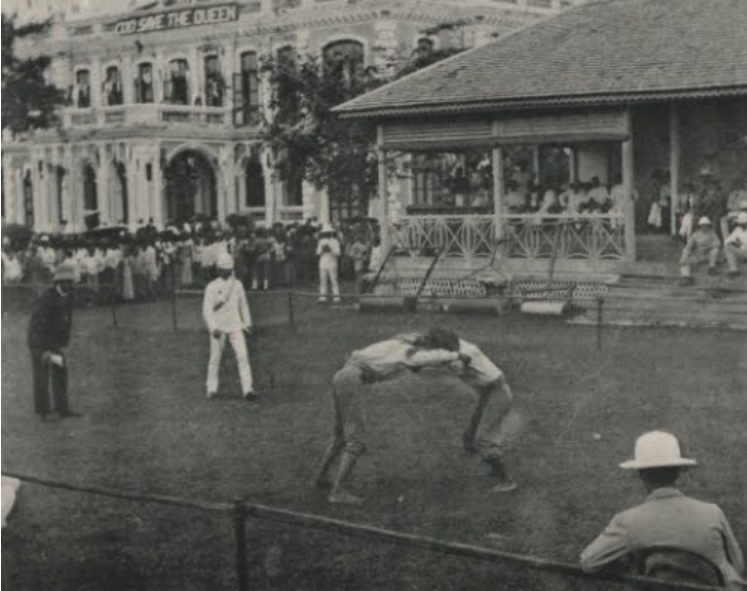
During the observance of the Diamond Jubilee of Queen Victoria at George Town, Penang, members of the Sikh Contingent in Penang staged a wrestling match for spectators.

In 1897, the Straits Police sent a contingent to the Diamond Jubilee of Queen Victoria under the command of Chief Inspector Jennings. There were ten men from Singapore, nine from Penang, and five from Malacca. There were also men joining them from the Dindings and Province Wellesley. They left on 6 May from Singapore, and reached Gravesend on 9 June, where they sailed up the River Thames and finally landed at the Albert Docks at 7am. In addition to marching in the parade that week, they toured the area around London, and also saw matinee performances by Henry Irving. They were also joined by the Malay States Guides.

=== Brunei ===
While Brunei was not a member of the Straits Settlements, the Straits Settlements Police Force created the modern Brunei Police Force in 1906, staffing its leadership with its own officers, and deploying members to Borneo for that purpose.

=== Christmas Island ===
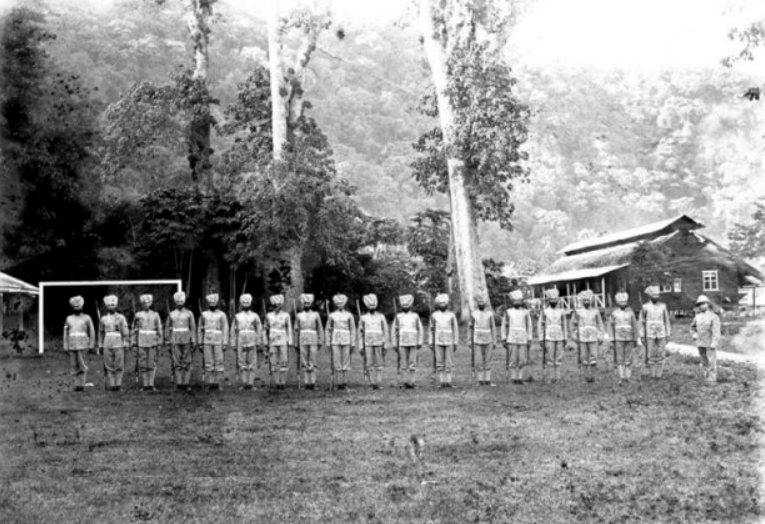
Members of the Sikh Contingent stationed at Christmas Island, circa 1910.

In 1888, the British Crown annexed Christmas Island and placed it under the control of the Straits Settlements. It was the smallest and most remote outstation of the Straits. The next year, in 1898, a small band of five members of the Sikh Contingent were deployed to Christmas Island to staff the police station there, where there had already been some Malay private security watchmen. By 1901, the Sikh Contingent was up to 13 policemen.

The police stationed at Christmas Island thenceforth were entirely composed of the Sikh Contingent, regularly rotated to the island from Sikh Contingent Headquarters in Singapore. In the early 1900s, mass labor strikes as the phosphate mines were quickly quelled by the Sikh Contingent.

After Singapore had fallen to the Japanese during the Second World War, Christmas Island was one of the last holdouts of the Straits Settlements. More importantly to the Japanese, the island held large phosphate mines – a material used in explosives. The local Indian and Punjabi troops stationed on the island mutinied. They believed that if they took the island, the Japanese would see them as liberators. They were assisted in the mutiny by the members of the Sikh Contingent. The mutineers shot and killed five British soldiers, and the next day, the Japanese commenced the beach landings of the Battle of Christmas Island.

=== Dindings ===
With the signing of the Pangkor Treaty of 1874, Pangkor Island and Dinding were created as The Dindings. It held dependency status under Penang, but was administered "as a matter of convenience," by the Resident of Perak. A small police station was established on Pangkor and staffed by constabulary under a European Sergeant to assist the Penghulu there. The first Officer in Charge of the station was Inspector Warne, who worked there for six months, replaced by Inspector Cooper. Cooper was in charge until April 1877, when Captain Christopher Henry Lloyd was appointed the first Superintendent of the Dindings. On 25 October 1878, Captain Lloyd was murdered on Pangkor "by a gang of Chinese robbers" from the Lumut Estate. At the beginning of 1879, Lloyd was replaced by Inspector R. R. Bruce, an inspector from the Perak Contingent of the Federated Malay States Police, who was nearly killed from a stab wound on 15 September 1882, and resigned his appointment. Lloyd was replaced by Urban Bruce, but he also died in an accident on 23 November 1884. Urban Bruce was replaced by the Perak government administrator Arthur Tomkyns Dew until July 1886, when an officer of the Colonial Service was placed in charge. Ordinance XI of 1886 then transferred the Dindings from Penang to Singapore. Ordinance IX of 1890 then returned the Dindings back to Penang.

In February 1935, the Dindings were officially retroceded to Perak, within the jurisdiction of the Federated Malay States Police. There was no ceremony to change the flags from the Union Jack to the State of Perak. The District Officer, Mr. Gregg, met with the Chief Police Officer of Perak, Nevil Alfred Malcolm Griffin, and they read the legal agreement of retrocession. Griffin officially became the first FMS CPO to manage the Dindings for Perak. Only two months later, Nevil Griffin took charge of Singapore as CPO there.

=== Labuan ===
After 1902, the Crown Colony of Labuan joined the Straits Settlements and the SSPF, prior to that it was in the jurisdiction of the British North Borneo Constabulary.

=== Malacca ===
In April 1874, the Treaty of Sungai Ujong was signed.

In July 1874, the Malay Police was considered too small to perform the tasks of which it was expected to accomplish, and they were not even able to properly address petty theft. Constables were paid so little that after they received training, they would often leave Malacca and volunteer for services in the other Malay States, especially down to Klang, where they would receive much higher pay for the same work. Malacca had much trouble growing its force. That year, there were only 212 members of a police force expected to police an entire Settlement twice the size of Penang and Province Wellesley, and five times as large as Singapore. About 6% of the constables on staff were usually out sick at any time of the year, and even more than that were often granted extended leave of absence. One constable was always stationed on guard duty at the Stadthuys, one was stationed at the opium farm, and one was stationed at the Spirit Farm. The others were distributed to the various police stations or on patrol. At the police headquarters in Malacca City, there were rarely more than only 28 constables available to respond to a crime or an emergency.

In December 1874, Mr. Hayward was the Acting Superintendent of the Malacca Police. A "Chinese riot" broke out in 1875, of which many deaths occurred. The police being inadequate to address it, 200 soldiers of the 3rd Regiment were despatched from Penang to quell the riots.

In 1876, there were still only 229 members of the Malacca Police, including the Superintendent. They had 29 police stations, and important note was made of the station at Sempang on the Lingey River. The biggest threat made note of for the police were secret societies, whom they called Kongsees. Murders had decreased since the previous year, but this was accounted for the fact that the Chinese riot had occurred, and murders were higher in 1876 than they had been annually from 1871 to 1874. A "vast increase in crime" was attributed to "quarrels between two Chinese Secret Societies – called the Hobeng and the Gheboo." In the Assizes courts that year, only 39 of the 64 capital cases were heard in Malacca City, the rest being sent down to Singapore because there were not enough jurors.

In 1877, the Malacca Police had grown to 235 members, and they were successfully able to suppress a riot between the Hock Beng and Ghee Hin Kongsi.

By 1881, Hayward was serving as Superintendent (Chief Police Officer), facing retirement.

=== Penang ===
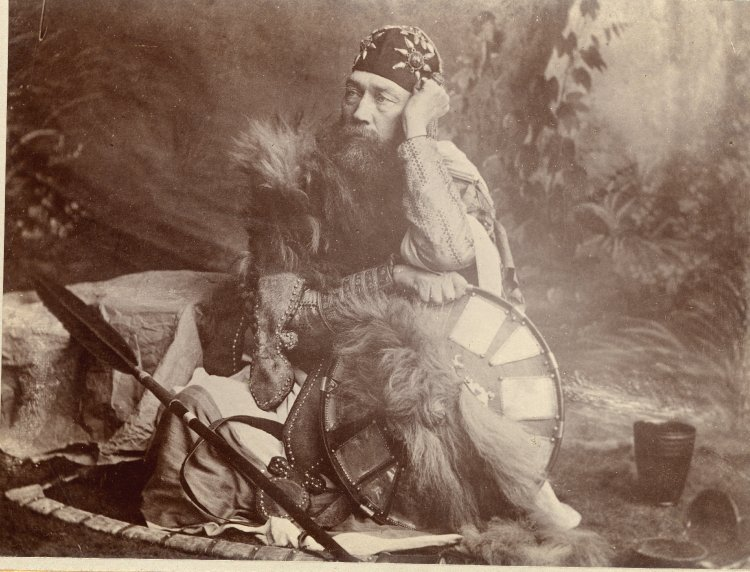
Captain Speedy was the first or second Chief Police Officer of Penang for the Straits Settlements Police.

After the Police Force Ordinance was drafted in 1871, the Penang Police Force was merged into the Straits Settlements Police Force. Tristram Speedy arrived in the Straits around this time, and he was made the first or second Superintendent of Penang under the Straits Settlements Police, possibly replacing Acting Superintendent George Cox, who had died suddenly in January 1872. Speedy resigned from the police in 1873, after having discovered a revolutionary plot brewing in Larut, leading troops to quell it. He was replaced by H. Plunket, the brother of the Inspector General. For the next several years, Superintendents rotated through Penang as the Straits Police required; C. B. Waller, Robert Walter Maxwell, and others.

Initially, the headquarters of the Penang Police were based at Fort Cornwallis, but in 1890, the first Police Headquarters Complex was built on the corner of Beach Street and Light Street. The Central Police Station and the Police Court were both part of the same complex.

In 1927, the new headquarters of the Penang Police were built at Patani Road.

=== Province Wellesley ===
The Central Police Station for Province Wellesley, while it still existed as a unique police entity, was in Butterworth. For the decade from 1896 to 1906, Major Hargrave Barry de Hamel served as the Superintendent of Police for Province Wellesley.

=== Singapore ===
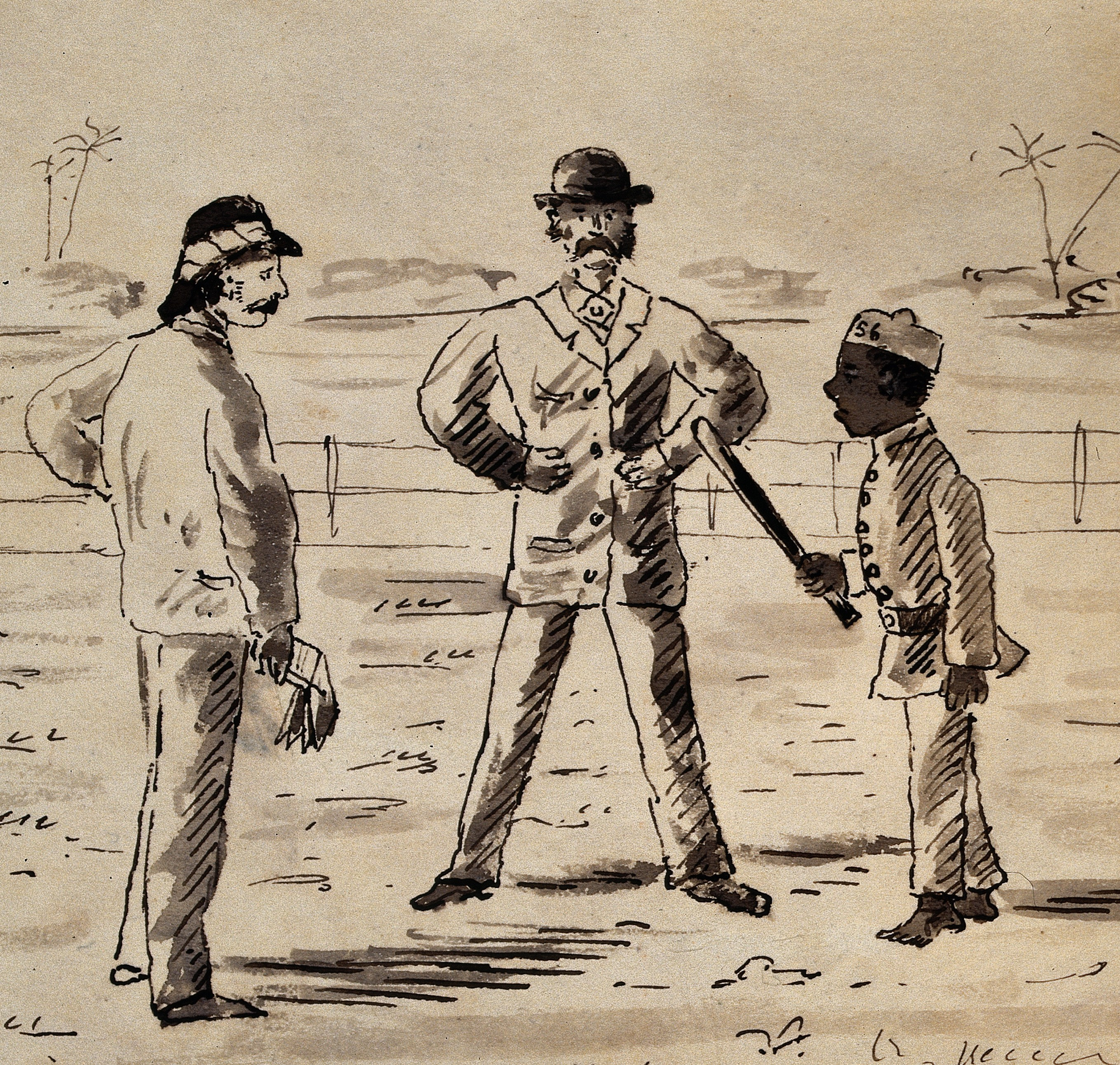
A pen and ink depiction of a Straits Settlements Police Officer clearing two race-goers from the Singapore Racecourse in 1881.

Singapore Town was the capitol of the Straits Settlements by the time that the Straits Police were established. As such, it held the offices of the Inspector General, Headquarters for the whole Force, the Financial Branch, CID, the Sikh Contingent, and the Training Depot. More money was invested into Singapore, and so more officers and constables were in the Singapore Police than in any other of the Settlements, despite the fact that it was the smallest in area of the three original Settlements. The first Chief Police Officer for Singapore under the Straits Settlements Police was Robert Walter Maxwell.

== Weapons, uniforms, and equipment ==
The khaki uniform was worn from 1890 until 1942.

In 1893, the uniforms of each Settlement were made identical for the first time.

== Ranks ==
| Gazetted Officers | | | | | | Ref. |
|---|---|---|---|---|---|---|
| Inspector General | Deputy Inspector General (After 1940) | Chief Police Officer / Superintendent | Assistant Superintendent | Chief Inspector | Inspector | |

| Superior Officers | | | | | | Ref. |
|---|---|---|---|---|---|---|
| Sub-Inspector | Sergeant-Major | Sergeant | Subedar Major | Jemedar | Corporal | |

Sikh Contingent
| Subedar Major | Jemedar |

| Constabulary | | Ref. |
|---|---|---|
| Constable, 1st Class | Constable, 2nd Class | |

== Inspectors General of the Straits Settlements Police ==
| # | Portrait | Inspector-General of Police | Term start | Term end | Ref. |
|---|---|---|---|---|---|
| 1 | | Charles Bushe Plunket | 1872 | 1875 | |
| 2 | | Samuel Dunlop | 1875 | 1891 | |
| 3 | | Robert Walter Maxwell | 1891 | 1895 | |
| 4 | | Edward Graham Pennefather | 1895 | 1906 | |
| 5 | | William Andrew Cuscaden | 1906 | 1914 | |
| 6 | | Alexander Richard Chancellor | 1914 | 1923 | |
| 7 | | Godfrey Charles Denham | 1923 | 1925 | |
| 8 | | Harold Fairburn | 1925 | 1935 | |
| 9 | | René H de S Onraet | 1935 | 1939 | |
| 10 | | Arthur Harold Dickinson | 1939 | 1942 (POW) | |
