= Thomas Dunman =

First Commissioner of Police of Singapore

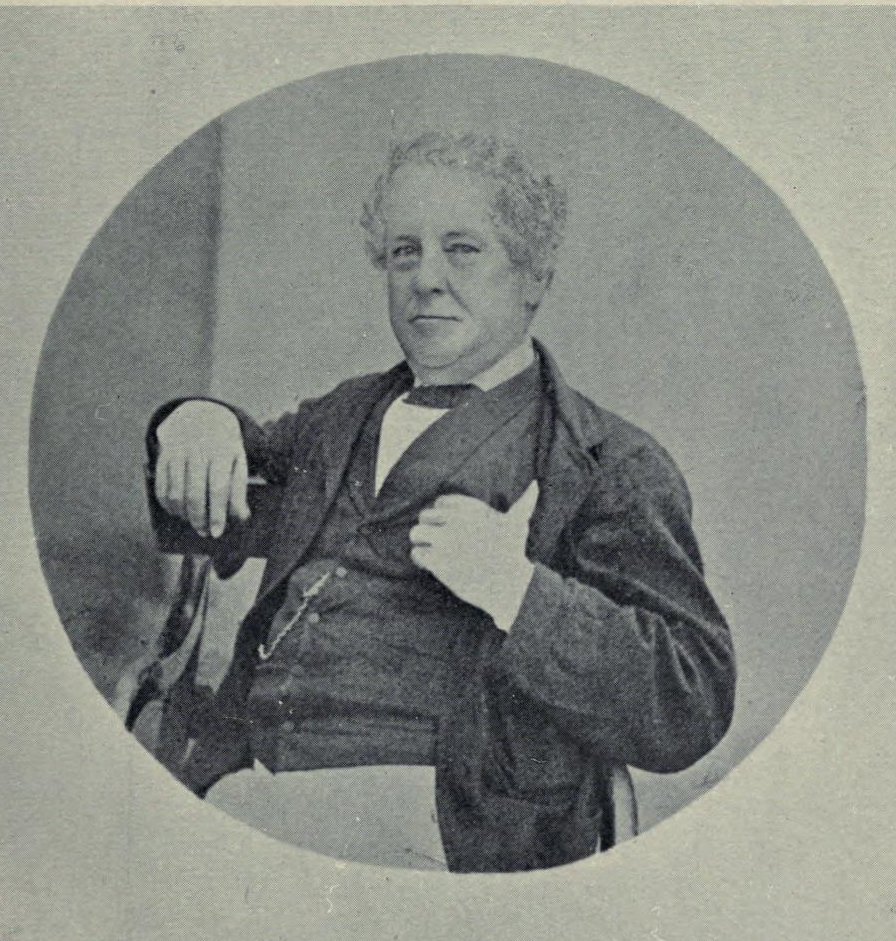
- Born: 1814; United Kingdom
- Died: 1887 (aged 72–73); Bournemouth, United Kingdom
- Police career
- Country: Singapore, Straits Settlements
- Department: Straits Settlements Police
- Service years: 1843–1871
- Rank: Commissioner of Police

Thomas Dunman (1814–1887) was an Englishman who served as the first Commissioner of Police in Singapore, Straits Settlements from 1856 to 1871.

== History ==
Born in the United Kingdom in 1814, Dunman had Anglo-Saxon origins from the town of Dunham (Note: One or other of the neighbouring villages of Great Dunham and Little Dunham.) in Norfolk, England.

Dunman came to Singapore in 1840 as an assistant in the merchant firm Martin Dyce & Co. He entered the police force in 1843 as both a Deputy Magistrate and the Deputy Superintendent of Police. He was made Superintendent of Police in 1851, and Commissioner of Police on 1 January 1857.

During his time heading the police force, Dunman was known for being on good terms with the people of various classes and communities within Singapore, and thus able to gain assistance and information regarding what was happening in the city. He was described as being “intimate acquaintance with the manners and habits of the Natives”. He was respected by leaders of the European community, and supported by influential Muslim Malays leaders, Straits Chinese leaders and the local Indian community.

During this time, Singapore was flooded with immigrants who often entered though illegal means from non-British controlled part of Malaysia such as Kuala Lumpur, and as stowaways on ships from India and Southeast Asia. Some of these immigrants smuggled items such as opium for sale in Singapore's illegal opium dens. It is because of this that opium merchants and organized criminal societies like the "Triads", or the Chinese "black societies", (Note: 黑社会; Hēi shè huì) saw Singapore as a seaport of vices where they could become wealthy or hide their illegal gains. Murders, Sex trafficking, and human trafficking of Chinese coolies, which the Chinese referred to under the euphemism of "selling piglets", (Note: 卖猪仔; Mài zhū zǎi) also plagued the colony. These issues were further exasperated by the small size of the colonial police force; the entire force having only 18 men in 1831.

Dunman improved the efficiency and training of the police force. The police force previously had a lack of proper supervision and officers were in poor morale. Among the measures he introduced were improved pay and working hours for policemen, setting up training programmes under new standardised rules and regulations, night classes for members of the force, and the creation of a pension scheme for retired policemen. Morale in the force improved and the crime rate in Singapore decreased under his leadership.

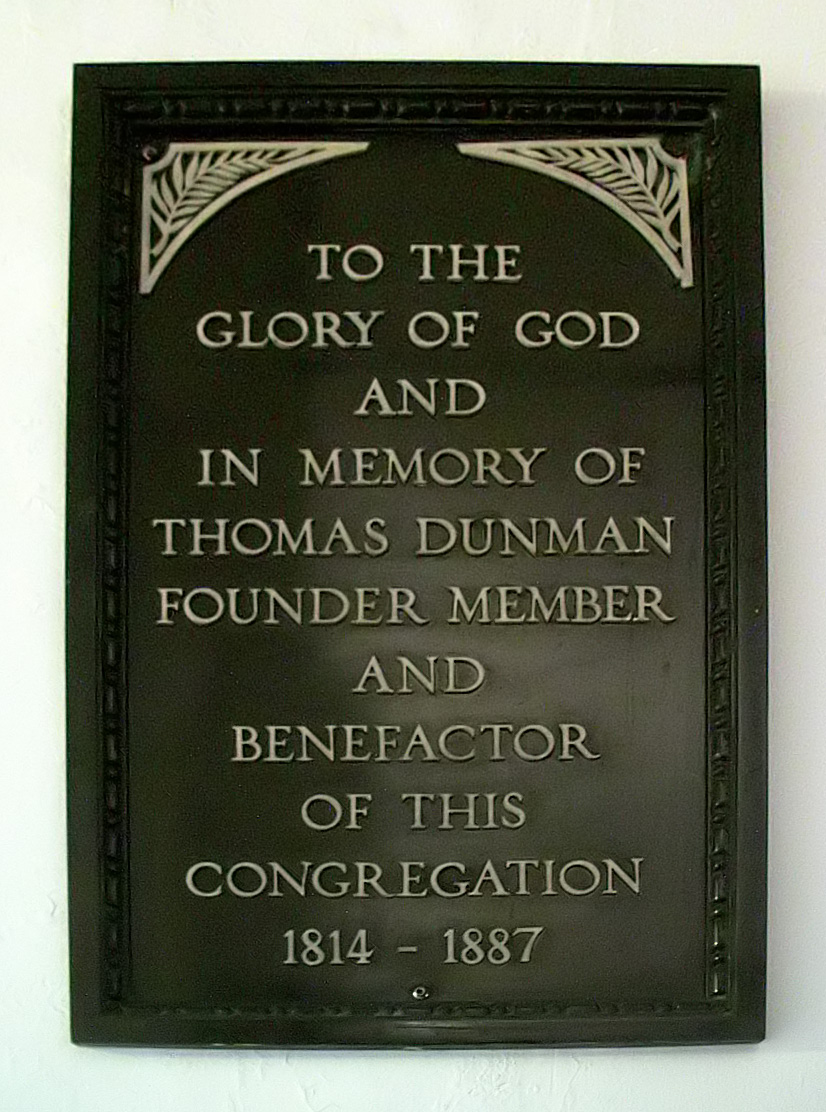
A wooden plaque commemorating Thomas Dunman at Orchard Road Presbyterian Church

Dunman was the founding president of The Tanglin Club in 1865. Dunman was also one of the founding members of Orchard Road Presbyterian Church in Singapore.

== Later life and death ==
Dunman retired from the police force in 1871, and spent the next few years on his coconut plantation, Grove Estate, in what is now the Mountbatten area of Katong. He returned to England in 1875, and died in Bournemouth, England in 1887.

== Legacy ==
Dunman Road and Dunman Lane in the Katong area of Singapore are named after Thomas Dunman, as are Dunman High School and Dunman Secondary School.

Dunman's Green park in Singapore was also named after him, although it was renamed Hong Lim Green in 1876 and then Hong Lim Park in 1960.

== See also ==
- Commissioner of Police (Singapore)
