= Civil Affairs Police Force =

- Abbreviation: CAPF

Agency overview
- Formed: September 1945
- Preceding agencies: Federated Malay States Police; Straits Settlements Police
- Dissolved: April 1946 (renamed to Malayan Union Police Force)
- Superseding agency: Malayan Union Police Force

Jurisdictional structure
- Legal jurisdiction: National
- General nature: Civilian police

Operational structure
- Headquarters: Kuala Lumpur, Malaya
- Agency executive: H. B. Longworthy, Commissioner of Police

The Civil Affairs Police Force (CAPF) was established to maintain peace and security in British Malaya. The force was set up by the British Military Administration which took over the administration of Malaya from the Japanese Imperial Army when the latter surrendered in August 1945.

The establishment of CAPF in September 1945 was an important development in the history of the police force. It was the first time a single, centrally administered police force was set up for the entire British Malaya. Prior to the Japanese Occupation from 1942 to 1945, several police forces existed in the region.

The force was led by Commissioner of Police H. B. Longworthy.

As an initial step to restore the police force, all existing police officers were sent for intensive training courses at the newly built police training centre in Kuala Lumpur. By 1946, a total of 1,512 police officers from all over Malaya had completed the Refresher Courses at the training centre.

In January 1946, CAPF began accepting new recruits. The first recruitment drive had to reject about 85 per cent of the applicants due to overwhelming response. In the first recruitment of 700 new officers, 500 were trained in Kuala Lumpur while the remaining 200 were trained in Johor Bahru.

On 1 April 1946, in line with the establishment of the Malayan Union, the Civil Affairs Police Force was renamed to Malayan Union Police Force.
