= Malayan Security Service =

The Malayan Security Service (MSS) (Malay: Cawangan Khas) was the domestic security service of colonial Malaya and Singapore from 1939 to 1948. It was established to replace and centralize the operations of the individual intelligence and security agencies of the Federated Malay States and Straits Settlements under one, Pan-Malayan organization for the entire Peninsular. It was modeled closely after the MI5, the United Kingdom’s domestic counterintelligence agency, in that it was primarily tasked with information gathering and had no executive powers to detain or arrest. It was distinct and separate from the Criminal Investigational Division Branches (CID) of the Malayan or Singapore Police.

The MSS faced much difficulty throughout its short existence. In the immediate years following its creation, its development was severely hampered by the Japanese occupation of Malaya which lasted until 1945. Following the end of the war, the MSS was unable to recruit qualified officers and translators and remained chronically underpowered. The organization was dissolved shortly after on August 23, 1948, just two months after the beginning of the Malayan Emergency. It was replaced by the two Special Branches of Malaya and Singapore which both fell under the control of the respective Deputy Commissioner of Police in each territory.

The MSS was headquartered on Robinson Road, Singapore and contained a Malayan branch in Kuala Lumpur.

== Charter and purpose ==
=== Charter ===
A Pan-Malayan Headquarters at present stationed in Singapore will obtain and collate all Security Intelligence emanating from MSS branches throughout the Peninsula and collect and collate information on subversive organisations and personalities in Malaya and Singapore.

=== Purpose ===
1. To collect and collate information on subversive organisations and personalities in Malaya and Singapore.
2. To advise, so far as they [sic] are able, the two Governments [Malaya and Singapore] as to the extent to which Internal Security is threatened by the activities of such an organisation [sic].
3. To keep the two Governments informed of the trends of public opinion which affect, or are likely to affect the Security of Malaya.
4. To maintain a Central Registry of Aliens.
5. To maintain a close liaison with other Security Intelligence Organisations, and the Defence Security Officer [MI5].
6. To exercise supervision of the Mecca Pilgrimage.

== History and development ==
=== Establishment ===
Throughout the first half of the 20th century, the British colonial government lacked a coordinated intelligence effort in the Malay Peninsula. In the Federated Malay States (FMS), an Intelligence Bureau was established and run by the Federated Malay States Police and was primarily tasked with collecting political and criminal intelligence. In contrast, the Straits Settlements had a Special Branch, while there was no organized coverage in the Unfederated Malay States. Thus, upon the suggestion of the MI5 and the colonial governments in Malaya and Singapore, the MSS was established in September 1939 by Arthur Dickinson, the Inspector General of the Straits Settlements Police. Dickinson was also worried about a potential war with Japan which further motivated his desire for the restructuring of the Peninsula’s intelligence services. Despite this, by the time of the Japanese invasion, the MSS was not yet fully operational.

=== Pre-war ===
The service frequently liaised and cooperated with British Special Branch agencies in Hong Kong and Burma as well as Dutch intelligence agencies in the Dutch East Indies and French agencies in French Indochina. It maintained a “Central Registry of Aliens” to surveil and monitor the activities of the increasing number of Japanese businessmen and tourists in Malaya and Singapore, many of whom were working for Japanese intelligence services. Finally, with reference to “supervision of the Mecca Pilgrimage”, the MSS would assign a Malay officer to escort pilgrims to the Mecca who would, upon return to Singapore, prepare a report for the MSS regarding whether pilgrims were exposed to any anti-British propaganda by Saudi Arabian authorities during the Hajj.

=== World War II and the Japanese occupation of Malaya ===
During the occupation which officially began on December 8, 1941, the service’s operations were paused. However, by as early as 1943, the British government had decided that the MSS was to be re-established and have its operations resumed following the end of the war.

=== Post-war ===
Following the end of the war, leadership of the MSS changed hands multiple times. When the British Military Administration of Malaya and Singapore (BMA) began on September 12, 1945, the MSS Singapore Division was headed by Major J.C. Berry while the Malaya Division was headed by J.M. McLean. Both men, however, were declared medically unfit and retired to the UK, and Major Berry was replaced by Alan E.G. Blades.

The service officially resumed on April 1, 1946 with the establishment of the Malayan Union and the ending of the British Military Administration. While Lieutenant Colonel John Dalley was appointed as MSS Director on the same day, he was still located in the UK and L.F. Knight was appointed as Acting Director. Dalley finally returned to Singapore on February 5, 1947 and resumed his role as Director then.

To gather political and security intelligence, the MSS posted a Local Security Officer (LSO) to each state except in Kelantan, Terengganu, Melaka, and Pahang due to a shortage of officers. In these states, intelligence gathering was done by the Criminal Investigation Departments (CID) of the local police. Each LSO would then produce intelligence reports to be sent to the Chief Police Officers of the concerned states in addition to MSS headquarters in Kuala Lumpur and Singapore.

To share the information had been gathered by LSOs, the MSS began releasing a fortnightly report named the Political Intelligence Journal (PIJ). This lasted from the MSS’s re-establishment in April 1946 to the month leading up to its dissolution in 1948. These reports largely focused on potential Indonesian expansion and political activities in Malaya, Malay nationalism, Communism, and labor unrest.

=== Dissolution ===
The service was dissolved on August 23, 1948 and its functions were taken over by the newly-resuscitated Special Branches of Malaya and Singapore. Following this, former MSS Director Dalley returned to Britain, thus ending his 28-year long career in Malaya that had begun in 1920.

=== Problems faced by the MSS ===
The service faced a shortage of qualified staff throughout the Emergency. For example, the authorized establishment for LSOs was 11 in Malaya and 7 in Singapore, but at the peak of its strength, there were only 6 and 3 LSOs respectively. In addition, of the 9 LSOs, only one, Ian S. Wylie of Selangor, could speak Chinese (more specifically the Cantonese dialect). This impeded the MSS from gathering information about the Malayan Communist Party which was predominantly Chinese in membership. The MSS also severely lacked assistant LSOs, enquiry staff, and translators.

All this was much to the concern of Lieutenant Colonel Dalley who wrote to the Governor Sir Edward Gent in March 1947 and stated the MSS was short of thirteen European officers. In his letter, he also stated

“I wish to state now, that M.S.S. is unable to perform its [sic] duties under these conditions. No matter how willing their service, no matter how hard they work, the officers now in the M.S.S. are unable to cover all the ground that needs to be covered.”

In addition to this, Dalley also approached the two Commissioners of Police in Malaya “to supply suitable staff for Malaya Security Service from their strength to bring M.S.S up to establishment”, but was rejected. In reality, both the MSS and the police forces of Malaya and Singapore were short-staffed following the end of the war. This phenomenon was to remain up until the service’s dissolution in August 1948.

=== Criticism of the MSS ===
The service received heavy criticism from High Commission Sir Edward Gent and Commissioner-General Malcolm MacDonald for not predicting or forewarning the MCP’s violent uprising in June 1948. Historian Leon Comber contends that Dalley did indeed provide sufficient information about the MCP but "did not actually spell out the actual scale and timing of the CPM’s decision to resort to an armed struggle". In addition, he states that “the information he provided in the MSS’s Political Intelligence Journal was diffuse and spread over a wide range of topics, without necessarily singling out the CPM as the main target.”

== Gazetted Officers of the MSS ==
Gazetted Officers, Malayan Security Service 1948
| Name | Rank | Location |
|---|---|---|
| J.D. Dalley | Director, Pan-Malaya | Singapore |
| N.G. Morris | Acting Deputy Director | Singapore |
| A.E.G. Blakes | Assistant Director | Singapore |
| C.M.J. Kirke | Acting Deputy Director | Kuala Lumpur |
| I.S. Wylie | Local Security Officer | Selangor |
| W. Elphinstone | Local Security Officer | Johor |
| D.N. Livingstone | Local Security Officer | Kedah/Perlis |
| H.T.B. Ryves | Local Security Officer | Perak |
| K.B. Larby | Local Security Officer | Penang |
| R.W. Quixley | Local Security Officer | Negeri Sembilan |
| J.E. Fairbairn | Local Security Officer | Singapore |
| R.B. Corridon | Local Security Officer | Singapore |
| H.J. Woolnough | Local Security Officer | Singapore |
