= 1930 New Year Honours =

British royal recognitions

The 1930 New Year Honours were appointments by King George V to various orders and honours to reward and highlight good works by citizens of the United Kingdom and British Empire. They were announced on 31 December 1929.

The recipients of honours are displayed here as they were styled before their new honour, and arranged by honour, with classes (Knight, Knight Grand Cross, etc.) and then divisions (Military, Civil, etc.) as appropriate.

== United Kingdom and Colonies ==
=== Baron ===
- Major Dudley Leigh Aman DSC JP For public and political services.
- The Right Honourable Sir Willoughby Hyett Dickinson KBE JP DL Honorary Secretary of the World Alliance for promoting International Friendship through the Churches. For public services and for services in the cause of peace.
- Sir William Joseph Noble Bt JP Ex-President of the Chamber of Shipping of the United Kingdom.
- Arthur Augustus William Harry Ponsonby MP Parliamentary Secretary, Ministry of Transport. For public and political services.
- Marshal of the Royal Air Force Sir Hugh Montague Trenchard Bt GCB DSO Chief of the Air Staff since 1919.
- Colonel, Royal Scots Fusiliers Sir Charles Cheers Wakefield Bt CBE For public and philanthropic services.

=== Privy Councillor ===
The King appointed the following to His Majesty's Most Honourable Privy Council:

- Colonel George Joachim, Viscount Goschen GCSI GCIE CBE VD Lately Governor of Madras.

=== Baronetcies ===
- Louis Bernhard Baron. For public and philanthropic services.
- Sir (Thomas) Gregory Foster Provost of University College, London, and recently Vice-Chancellor of the University.
- Sir William Middlebrook JP For distinguished public services over a long period of years. Formerly Chairman of the Local Legislation Committee of the House of Commons.
- Sir Eustace Henry William Tennyson-d'Eyncourt KCB FRS At one time Director of Naval Construction, Admiralty.

=== Knight Bachelor ===
- John Ballinger CBE Librarian of the National Library of Wales, Aberystwyth.
- Professor Granville Bantock FRCM Professor of Music, Birmingham University.
- Alderman Herbert Carden. For public services in Sussex.
- Lawrence Wensley Chubb, Secretary of the Commons and Footpaths Preservation Society for 35 years. Secretary of the National Playing Fields Association since 1928.
- Lieutenant-Colonel Henry Walter George Cole CSI CVO OBE Director, Exhibitions Division, Department of Overseas Trade.
- Reginald Kennedy-Cox JP Honorary Warden of the Dockland Settlements and Malvern Clubs Council.
- Nigel George Davidson. CBE Legal Secretary to the Sudan Government.
- Edward Francis Knapp Fisher. Receiver General of Westminster Abbey.
- Archibald Dennis Flower, Chairman of the Governors of the Shakespeare National Memorial Theatre, Stratford-on-Avon.
- James Henry Ford, Clerk to the Leeds Board of Guardians. Member of the Executive Council of the Association of Poor Law Unions.
- Colonel St. John Corbet Gore CB CVO CBE Lieutenant of His Majesty's Body Guard of the Honourable Corps of Gentlemen at Arms.
- Charles Henry Gott, Chief Valuer (England and Wales); Board of Inland Revenue.
- Edward William Hansell KC Official Referee, Supreme Court of Judicature.
- Lieutenant-Colonel James Stuart Knox OBE Prison Commissioner and Director of Convict Prisons.
- Professor Thomas Percy Nunn Principal, London Day Training College and Professor of Education University of London.
- Archibald Page, Chief Engineer and Manager, Central. Electricity Board. A Past President of the Institute of Electrical Engineers.
- George William Paton, Chairman and Managing Director of Bryant and May Limited. For public services.
- Tom Percival, Clerk to the Tynemouth Board of Guardians. Formerly President of the National Poor Law Officers Association.
- John Ritchie, Chief Inspector, Board of Customs and Excise.
- Alfred William Tyler JP Manager, Co-operative Printing Society.
- Emery Walker, Process engraver and Printer. Past Master of the Art Workers Guild. Late President of the Arts and Crafts Exhibition Society, A Trustee of the Wallace Collection and a Fellow of the Society of Antiquaries.
- Frederick Joseph Wall, Secretary of the Football Association.
- Percy Emerson Watkins, Permanent Secretary, Welsh Department, Board of Education.
- William Edward Whyte OBE Clerk to the Middle Ward District Committee of Lanarkshire.
- William Courthope Townshend Wilson KC Vice-Chancellor of the County Palatine of Lancaster.
- Raymond Wybrow Woods CBE Solicitor to the General Post Office.

Dominions

- The Honourable James William Blair, Chief Justice of the Supreme Court, State of Queensland.
- The Honourable Thomas Kay Sidey, Attorney General, Dominion of New Zealand.
- Lieutenant-Colonel Robert Eccles Snowden VD Agent General in London for the State of Tasmania.

British India

- Diwan Bahadur Mannath Krishnan Nayar Avargal, Member of the Executive. Council of the Governor of Madras.
- Khan Bahadur Chaudhary Shahab-ud-din, President of the Legislative Council, Punjab.
- Justice Charles Edwin Odgers, Puisne Judge of the High Court, Madras.
- Justice Barjor Jamshedji Dalai, Indian Civil Service, Puisne Judge of the High Court, Allahabad.
- Alexander Rodger OBE Indian Forest Service, Inspector-General of Forests, Government of India.
- Lieutenant-Colonel Richard Henry Chenevix-Trench CIE OBE Political Department of the Government of India, Member of Council, His Exalted Highness the Nizam's Government, Hyderabad.
- Alexander Macdonald Rouse CIE Indian Service of Engineers, Chief Engineer, Delhi.
- Patrick Aloysius Kelly CIE Indian Police Service, Commissioner of Police, Bombay.
- Lieutenant-Colonel Walter Dorling Smiles CIE DSO Assam.
- Maharaja Bahadur Keshav Prashad Singh CBE Zamindar of Dumraon, Bihar and Orissa.
- Mohamed Ismail CIE OBE Diwan of Mysore State.
- Dinshah Fardunji Mulla CIE Advocate, Bombay High Court.
- Khan Bahadur Shah Nawaz Khan Bhutto CIE OBE President, District Local Board, Larkana, Bombay.
- Harisankar Paul, Bengal.

Colonies, Protectorates, etc.

- John Maxwell CMG Chief Commissioner, Ashanti.
- Herbert Cecil Stronge, Chief Justice, Leeward Islands.
- Henry Barclay Walcott CMG CBE Treasurer, Colony of Trinidad and Tobago.
- Wilfrid Wentworth Woods CMG Colonial Treasurer, Island of Ceylon.
- Professor Themistocles Zammit CMG Curator of the Museum, Malta. For scientific services.

=== The Most Honourable Order of the Bath ===
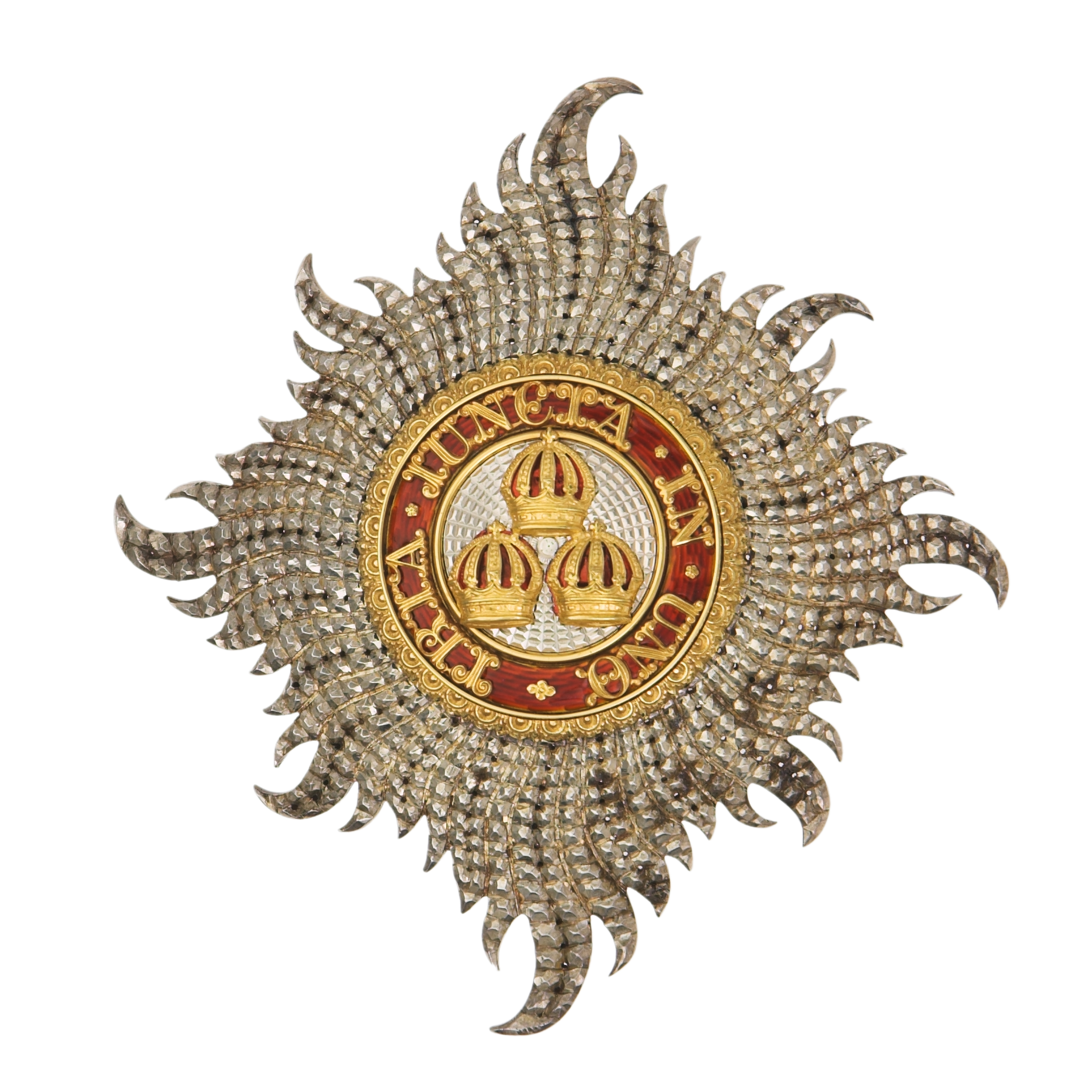
Civil star of the Knight Grand Cross of the Order of the Bath

==== Knight Grand Cross of the Order of the Bath (GCB) ====
Military Division
Royal Navy

- Admiral Sir William Edmund Goodenough KCB MVO

==== Knight Commander of the Order of the Bath (KCB) ====
Military Division
Royal Navy

- General Lewis Stratford Tollemache Halliday VC CB RM

Army

- Lieutenant-General Sir Percy Pollexfen de Blaquiere Radcliffe KCMG CB DSO Half pay list, formerly General Officer Commanding 4th Division.
- Lieutenant-General Kenneth Wigram CB CSI CBE DSO Indian Army, Commander, Waziristan District, India.
- Lieutenant-General Cyril Norman Macmullen CB CMG CIE DSO Indian Army, late Commander, Rawalpindi District, India.

==== Companion of the Order of the Bath (CB) ====
Military Division
Royal Navy

- Rear-Admiral Harold Owen Reinold CVO
- Rear-Admiral Gilbert Owen Stephenson CMG (Retired).
- Surgeon Rear-Admiral Robert William Basil Hall OBE MRCS LRCP
- Colonel Richard Foster Carter Foster CMG DSO RM
- Paymaster Captain Robert Alfred Jinkin OBE RN

Army

- Major-General David Harvey CMG CBE KHS (late Royal Army Medical Corps), Director of Pathology, The War Office.
- Major-General William Samuel Anthony CMG (late Royal Army Veterinary Corps), Director-General, Army Veterinary Services, The War Office.
- Colonel (temporary Brigadier) Charles John Cecil Grant DSO (late Coldstream Guards), Commander, 8th Infantry Brigade.
- Colonel Francis William Gosset CMG DSO (late Royal Artillery), Special Appointment, His Britannic Majesty's Embassy, Berlin.
- Colonel (temporary Brigadier) Hugh Roger Headlam CMG DSO (late The King's Own Royal Regiment (Lancaster)), Commander, 12th (Secunderabad) Infantry Brigade, India.
- Colonel (temporary Brigadier) William George Shedden Dobbie CMG DSO (late Royal Engineers), Commander, Cairo Brigade, Egypt.
- Major-General William Louis Oberkirch Twiss CBE MC Indian Army, Commander, Jullundur Brigade Area, India.
- Colonel (temporary Brigadier) Ivan Urmston Battye DSO Indian Army, Commander, Ferozepur Brigade Area, India.
- Colonel Frederick George Edward Lumb DSO MC Indian Army, late Assistant Adjutant & Quarter-Master-General, Rawalpindi District, India.
- Colonel Gerald Bassett Scott DSO Indian Army, Inspecting Officer, Frontier Corps, and Secretary to Chief Commissioner, North West Frontier, India.
- Colonel Arthur Brownfield Fry CIE DSO Indian Medical Service, Assistant Director of Medical Services, Presidency and Assam District, India.

Royal Air Force

- Air Commodore Reginald Percy Mills MC AFC Royal Air Force.

Civil Division

- Colonel Joseph Francis Noel Baxendale TD DL Retired, Territorial Army.
- Lieutenant-Colonel Hugh Bowes TD DL late Territorial Army Reserve of Officers.
- Herbert Ernest Fass OBE Principal Assistant Secretary, Treasury.
- William Wallace McKechnie Secretary, Scottish Education Department.
- John Charles Walton MC Secretary, Political Department, India Office.

=== The Most Exalted Order of the Star of India ===
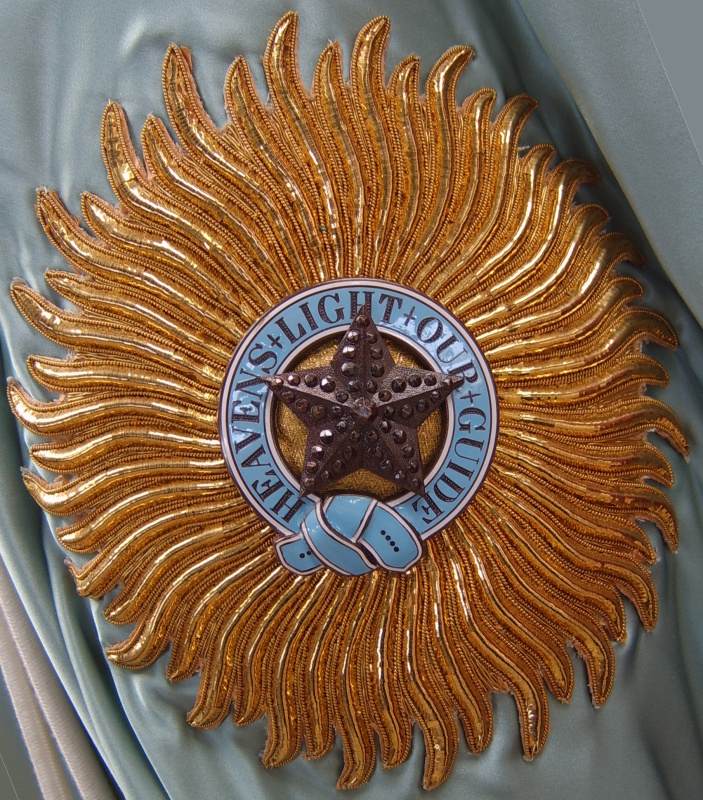
Star of a Knight Grand Commander of the Most Exalted Order of the Star of India.

==== Knight Grand Commander (GCSI) ====
- Field Marshal Sir William Riddell Birdwood Bt GCB GCMG KCSI CIE DSO Indian Army, Commander-in-Chief in India.

==== Knight Commander (KCSI) ====
- His Highness Maharaja Shri Lakhdirji Waghji, Maharaja of Morvi.

==== Companion (CSI) ====
- Harry Graham Haig CIE Indian Civil Service, Secretary to the Government of India, Home Department.
- Walter Hugh John Wilkinson CIE Indian Civil Service, lately British Envoy at the Court of Nepal.
- Hugh Aylmer Thornton CIE Indian Civil Service, Commissioner, Burma.
- Cyril James Irwin CIE VD Indian Civil Service, Commissioner, Central Provinces.

=== The Most Distinguished Order of Saint Michael and Saint George ===
Star of the Order of Saint Michael and Saint George.

==== Knight Grand Cross of the Order of St Michael and St George (GCMG) ====
- Sir Horace Archer Byatt KCMG lately Governor and Commander-in-Chief of the Colony of Trinidad and Tobago.
- The Right Honourable Sir Malcolm Arnold Robertson KCMG KBE lately His Majesty's Ambassador Extraordinary and Plenipotentiary at Buenos Aires.
- The Right Honourable Sir Joseph George Ward Bt KCMG Prime Minister of the Dominion of New Zealand.

==== Knight Commander of the Order of St Michael and St George (KCMG) ====
- Lieutenant-Colonel Andrew Balfour CB CMG Member of the Colonial Advisory Medical and Sanitary Committee, Director of the London School of Hygiene and Tropical Medicine.
- William Cecil Bottomley CB CMG OBE Assistant Under-Secretary of State, Colonial Office.
- Sir Edward Thomas Frederick Crowe Kt CMG Comptroller-General of the Department of Overseas Trade.
- Frederick William Leith-Ross CB Deputy Controller of Finance, Treasury. For services in connection with reparations.
- Horatio George Arthur Mackie CBE His Majesty's Consul-General at Paris.
- Sir James Crawford Maxwell KBE CMG Governor and Commander-in-Chief of Northern Rhodesia.
- The Honourable Michael Myers, Chief Justice of New Zealand.
- Professor the Honourable John Beverley Peden KC President of the Legislative Council, State of New South Wales.
- Frederick William Leith-Ross CB Deputy Controller of Finance, Treasury. For services in connection with reparations.
- Alexander Telford Waugh CMG lately His Majesty's Consul-General at Constantinople.

==== Companion of the Order of St Michael and St George (CMG) ====
- Harold d'Auvergne Aplin, Senior Provincial Commissioner, Nyasaland Protectorate.
- Shirley Clifford Atchley OBE Translator at His Majesty's Legation at Athens.
- Major The Honourable Cecil James Campbell, Legal Secretary to the Financial Adviser to the Egyptian Government.
- Roland John Farrer, President of the Municipal Commissioners, Singapore.
- Major William Birrell Gray, Administrator of the Colony, Nigeria.
- Arthur Francis Grimble, Resident Commissioner, Gilbert and Ellice Islands Colony.
- Herbert Hall Hall, one of the Inspectors-General of His Majesty's consular establishments.
- Edward William Kane, Clerk of the House of Representatives, Dominion of New Zealand.
- Walter David Loveridge, President of the Sydney Harbour Trust, State of New South Wales.
- Eric Charles Miéville, Secretary to the Governor-General of the Dominion of Canada.
- John Godfrey Matthew OBE Secretary for Education, Sudan Government.
- Francis d'Arcy Godolphin Osborne, Counsellor in His Majesty's Diplomatic Service.
- Robert Parker, a leading member of the musical profession in the Dominion of New Zealand.
- James Scott Pitkeathly CIE CVO CBE DSO for services as Director of Electrical Undertakings, Island of Ceylon.
- Lieutenant-Colonel Heaton Forbes Robinson, Director of Works, Imperial War Graves Commission.

=== Order of the Indian Empire ===
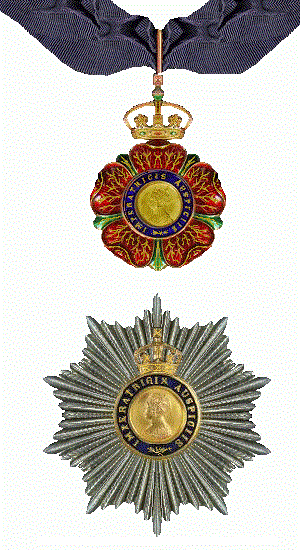
Riband, badge and star of the Knight Grand Commander of the Order of the Indian Empire

==== Knight Grand Commander (GCIE) ====
- Major His Highness Raj Rajeshwar Maharajadhiraja Sir Umaid Singh Bahadur KCSI KCVO Maharaja of Jodhpur.

==== Knight Commander (KCIE) ====
- Lancelot Graham CIE Indian Civil Service, Secretary to the Government of India, Legislative Department.
- Sir Edwin Landseer Lutyens RA FSA FRIBA
- Lieutenant-Colonel Henry Beauchamp St John CIE CBE Agent to the Governor-General and Chief Commissioner in Baluchistan.
- Alexander Montague Stow OBE Indian Civil Service, Member of the Executive Council of the Governor of the Punjab.
- Thakore Sahib Shri Bahadursinhji Mansinhji, Thakore Sahib of Palitana.

==== Companion (CIE) ====
- Lieutenant-Colonel Robert John Wingfield Heale OBE officiating Agent to the Governor-General in Central India.
- Mathew Brown Cameron Vice-Chancellor, Lucknow University.
- Alexander Norman Ley Cater, Indian Civil Service, Agent to the Governor-General in the Madras States.
- Frederic Alexander Sachse, Indian Civil Service, Commissioner, Bengal.
- Maurice Gamier Hallett, Indian Civil Service, Bihar and Orissa.
- Abraham James Laine, Indian Civil Service, Assam.
- Donald James Boyd, Indian Civil Service, Punjab.
- John Clague, Indian Civil Service, Chief Secretary to the Government of Burma.
- Colonel George Whitehall Ross DSO Indian Army, Military Accountant-General.
- Diwan Bahadur Jannyavula Venkatanarayana Nayudu Garu, Provincial Civil Service, Secretary to the Government of Madras.
- Tennant Sloan, Indian Civil Service, Secretary to Government, United Provinces.
- Robert George Grieve, Indian Educational Service, Director of Public Instruction, Madras.
- Samuel Walker AMICE Indian Service of Engineers, Chief Engineer and Secretary for Irrigation, North-West Frontier Province.
- Maurice Webb, Indian Civil Service, Bombay.
- Harold Lancelot Newman, Indian Forest Service, Chief Conservator of Forests, Bombay.
- Lieutenant-Colonel Walter Valentine Coppinger DSO FRCSI Indian Medical Service, Inspector-General of Civil Hospitals, Central Provinces.
- Bryce Chudleigh Burt MBE Indian Agricultural Service, Imperial Council of Agricultural Research, India.
- Lieutenant-Colonel Arthur Francis Hamilton FRCS Indian Medical Service, Professor of Midwifery, Grant Medical College, Bombay.
- John Lewis Sale, Indian Service of Engineers, Superintending Engineer, Delhi.
- William Poulter Roberts Indian Service of Engineers, Superintending Engineer, Cauvery-Mettur Project, Madras.
- Lieutenant-Colonel James Carmichael More DSO Indian Army, lately Political Agent, Kuwait, Persian Gulf.
- Sardar Bahadur Teja Singh Malik, Indian Service of Engineers, Executive Engineer, Delhi.
- Mian Mohammad Shah Nawaz, Member of the Legislative Assembly, Barrister at Law, Lahore.
- Rao Bahadur Kesho Waman Brahma MBE Pleader, Befar, Central Provinces.
- Khan Bahadur Sardar Hassan Khan, Gorchani, Officiating Tumandar of the Gurchani Tuman, Dera Ghazi Khan.

=== Order of the Crown of India ===
- Margaret Evelyn, Viscountess Goschen.

=== The Royal Victorian Order ===
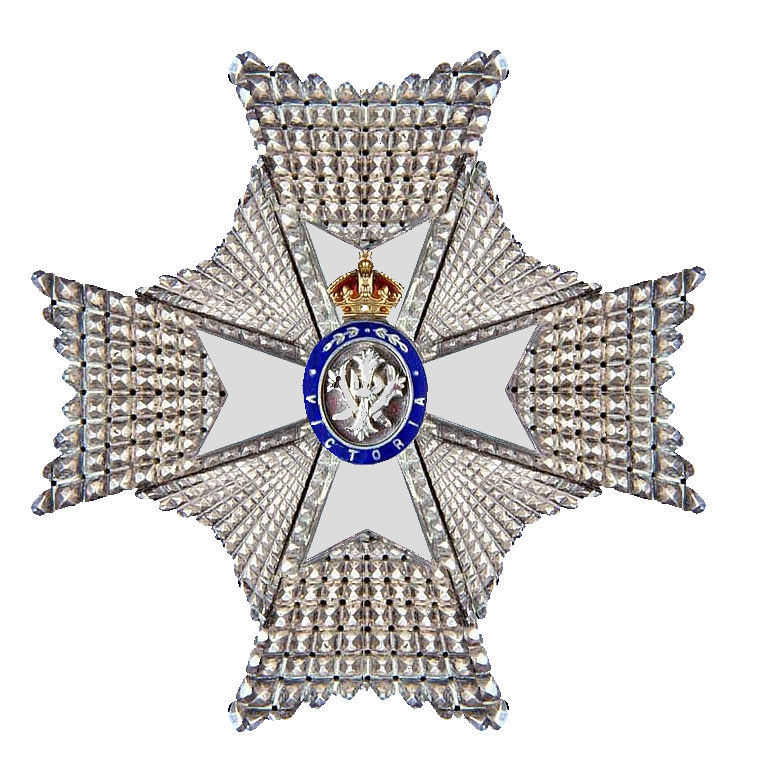
Insignia of a Knight Commander of the Royal Victorian Order

==== Knight Grand Cross of the Royal Victorian Order (GCVO) ====
- Henry Hugh Arthur Fitzroy, Duke of Beaufort.
- The Right Honourable Sir Frederick George Milner Bt
- Admiral Sir Colin Richard Keppel KCIE KCVO CB DSO

==== Knight Commander of the Royal Victorian Order (KCVO) ====
- Admiral Henry Hervey Campbell CB CVO
- Colin John Davidson CIE CVO
- Russell Facey Wilkinson MVO
- Leonard Lionel Cohen.

==== Commander of the Royal Victorian Order (CVO) ====
- Sir George Washington Badgerow CMG FRCS
- Brigadier-General George Camborne Beauclerk Paynter CMG DSO
- Herbert Stanley French CBE
- John Henry Girling MVO

==== Member of the Royal Victorian Order, 4th class (MVO) ====
- The Reverend Albert Lee MVO (Fifth Class).
- Hugh Hutchison Cassells.
- The Reverend Prebendary Arthur Chilton
- Squadron Leader David Sigismund Don RAF
- Geoffrey Cecil Hollings (Dated 19 December 1929.)
- John Harold Edmund Woods.

==== Member of the Royal Victorian Order, 5th class (MVO) ====
- Superintendent James McBrien OBE Metropolitan Police. (Dated 11 December 1929.)

=== The Most Excellent Order of the British Empire ===
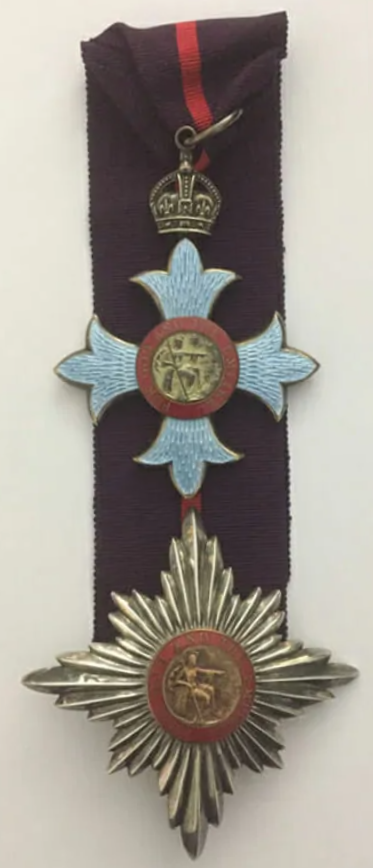
Knight Commander of the Order of the British Empire, insignia 1917–35

==== Knight Grand Cross of the Order of the British Empire (GBE) ====
Military Division
Royal Navy

- Admiral Sir Edward Eden Bradford KCB CVO (Retired).

==== Dame Commander of the Order of the British Empire (DBE) ====
- The Honourable Mary, Lady Bailey. For services to aviation.

==== Knight Commander of the Order of the British Empire (KBE) ====
Civil Division

- Harry Halton Fox CMG Commercial Counsellor attached to His Majesty's Legation at Peking.
- The Honourable Stanley Seymour Argyle lately Chief Secretary and Minister of Public Health, State of Victoria.

British India

- Mian Gul, Wadud of Swat, North-West Frontier Province.

Colonies, Protectorates, etc.

- Sir Frank Morrish Baddeley Kt CMG Chief Secretary to Government, Nigeria.

Honorary Knights Commander

- Raja Chulan CMG bin Sultan Abdullah, the Raja di Hilir of Perak, Federated Malay States.
- His Beatitude Yeghishe Turian, the Armenian Patriarch at Jerusalem.

==== Commander of the Order of the British Empire (CBE) ====
Military Division
Royal Navy

- Captain (Commodore 2nd Class) Richard Augustus Sandys Hill RN

Army

- Colonel George Bridges Stevens VD lately Officer Commanding Ceylon Planters Rifle Corps.

Civil Division

- The Honourable Walter John Harry Boyle, Senior Official Receiver, Bankruptcy (High Court) Department, Board of Trade.
- Professor John Samuel Strafford Brame FIC Professor of Chemistry and Metallurgy, Royal Naval College, Greenwich.
- Lieutenant-Colonel Alexander Francis Somerville Caldwell DSO Principal Education Officer, Air Ministry.
- Edmund Ralph Cook, Secretary to the Law Society. For services in connection with the establishment of the High Court Poor Persons Procedure.
- Charlotte Leonora, Lady Cooper OBE For public and charitable services.
- Captain Alban Tabor Austin Dobson, Assistant Secretary, Ministry of Agriculture and Fisheries.
- Alfred Dryland MICE County Surveyor of Middlesex. A Past President of the County Surveyors Society.
- Bernard Richard Theodore Grindle, Assistant Secretary, War Office.
- Morris Heyes , Treasurer and Accountant, Metropolitan Asylums Board.
- Percival Edward Meadon, Director of Education, Lancashire.
- Herbert George Muskett, Member of the firm of Wontner and Sons, Solicitors to the Commissioner of Metropolitan Police.
- Coventry Dick Peddie, lately Secretary, Northern Lighthouse Commissioners.
- Anne Glenday Philip, Chief Woman Inspector of Schools (England and Wales).
- Arthur Pugh JP For public services.
- Rose Rosenberg. Personal Private Secretary to the Prime Minister.
- Alderman Frank Sheppard OBE JP Chairman of the Bristol Juvenile Advisory Committee; and lately Vice-Chairman of the Bristol Local Employment Committee.
- Sidney Stallard DSO OBE Divisional Road Engineer, Ministry of Transport.
- William James Thome MP Member of Parliament for the Plaistow Division of West Ham. General Secretary of the National Union of General and Municipal Workers. For public and political services.
- Frank Newton Tribe OBE Principal, Ministry of Labour. Lately Principal Private Secretary to the Minister.

Diplomatic Service And Overseas List

- Clifford Edward Heathcote-Smith OBE His Majesty's Consul-General at Alexandria.
- Charles Armine Willis OBE Governor of Upper Nile Province, Sudan.

British India

- Lieutenant-Colonel William Arthur MacDonell Garstin OBE Political Agent, Khyber, North-West Frontier Province.
- Ramchandra Madhavram Bhatt, Bombay.

Colonies, Protectorates, etc.

- Arthur Albert Luckham, Resident Commissioner, Niue Island, Dominion of New Zealand.
- Rosa Sibella Macarthur Onslow. For philanthropic services in the State of New South Wales.
- James Andrews-Speed, formerly Unofficial Member of the Executive Council, Gibraltar. For public services.
- George Eaton Stannard Cubitt, Conservator of Forests, Straits Settlements and Federated Malay States.
- Charles William Doorly, Administrator of Saint Lucia.
- George Cornibert du Boulay, Deputy Colonial Secretary, Gold Coast.
- Harold Edwin Goodship, Chief Accountant, Kenya and Uganda Railways and Harbours.

Honorary Commanders

- Choo Kia Peng, formerly Unofficial Member of the Federal Council, Federated Malay States. For public services.
- Muhammed Diko, Emir of Katsina, Nigeria.
- Sheikh Suleiman bin Nasur el Lemki MBE senior Arab Member of the Legislative Council, Zanzibar.

==== Officer of the Order of the British Empire (OBE) ====
Military Division
Royal Navy

- Commander Graham Cunningham Glen DSO RN (Retired).
- Commander Geoffrey Coleridge Boles RN (Retired).
- Surgeon Commander William Innes Gerrard MRCP RN (Retired).

Army

- Major Walter Scott Blackett VD Quartermaster, Ceylon Mounted Rifles.
- Major (temporary Lieutenant-Colonel) Arthur Butler Clough MC Royal Engineers, lately employed with the Rhodesian-Congo Boundary Commission.
- Captain and Brevet Major Stanley James Cole, The Prince of Wales's Volunteers (South Lancashire), Staff Officer to the Inspector-General, Royal West African Frontier Force.
- Major Henry Edward Green DSO formerly The King's African Rifles, Staff Officer, Nyasaland Volunteer Reserve.

Civil Division

- Walter Louis Addyman, Deputy Controller, Pension Issue Office, Ministry of Pensions.
- Frank Blackburn, Deputy Chief Insurance Officer, Ministry of Labour.
- Alfred Bond, Assistant Controller, Money Order Department, General Post Office.
- Herbert Buckland, Assistant Accountant General, General Post Office.
- William Bertram Chrimes JP Chairman of the Liverpool King's Roll Committee, and member of the King's Roll National Council.
- Philip Clark, Head Clerk, Central Office of the Supreme Court, of Judicature.
- Alfred William Ayers Cuett MBE Manager; Constructive Department, H.M. Dockyard, Chatham.
- William Lewis Cook JP Conciliation Officer and Assistant Labour Adviser, Mines Department.
- Maria Elizabeth Dickin. Founder and Honorary Director of the People's Dispensary for Sick Animals of the Poor.
- Edward George Dixon JP For social and philanthropic services in Woolwich.
- Alexander Donald, Chief Constable of Kirkcudbright and Wigtown.
- Osmonde Hedworth Farrar, Master, S.S. Haiching, Hong Kong. For valuable services and personal bravery in frustrating attempted piracy.
- John George Fitzsimons, Deputy Inspector-General of Waterguard, Board of Customs and Excise.
- Tom Shirley Hawkins MBE MInstCE Civil Engineer, Secretarial Department, Ministry of Transport.
- Captain Giovanni Jenkin, Principal District Officer, Mercantile Marine Survey Service, Board of Trade.
- Captain Roger Norman Liptrot Principal Technical Officer, Air Ministry.
- Robert McGregor, Superintending Clerk, Department of the Accountant General of the Navy.
- Isabella Mcintosh McNair. For public services in the East of Scotland.
- Major Hugh Cochrane MacTier, Governor, Wandsworth Prison.
- Herbert William Mitchell, Senior Inspector of Taxes, Board of Inland Revenue.
- The Reverend Canon William Morgan Chairman of the Bangor and Beaumaris Board of Guardians, Alderman and ex-Chairman of Caernarvonshire County Council.
- Frederick Percy Nathan JP Leader, Salford Special Constabulary.
- Lieutenant-Colonel Herbert Pearson Creagh-Osborne, Retired Officer, Directorate of Movements and Quartering, War Office.
- Helen Grace Palin MBE RRC Principal Matron, Ministry of Pensions Nursing Service.
- Charles Allen Palmer, Secretary, Office of the Receiver for the Metropolitan Police.
- Robert Perry, Chief Officer, S.S. Haiching, Hong Kong. For valuable services and personal bravery in frustrating attempted piracy.
- Thomas Arthur Prest, Chief Examiner, Estate Duty Office, Board of Inland Revenue.
- Lily Richards, Matron, Royal Westminster Ophthalmic Hospital.
- William Alexander Ross, Principal, Ministry of Health.
- Edward Stuart Russell FLS Director of Fishery Investigations, Ministry of Agriculture and Fisheries.
- Michael Ryan, Superintending Inspector, Board of Customs and Excise.
- Henry Martin Spencer, Deputy Director of Education, Staffordshire.
- Lieutenant-Colonel John Steele DCM Commandant and Secretary; Royal Hospital, Kilmainham.
- Arthur Henry Ward, Clerk to the West Bromwich Board of Guardians.
- Dorothy Gladys Ward, Joint Secretary, Children's Country Holidays Fund.
- James Gray West MBE Senior Architect, Office of Works.
- William Williams, Superintending Inspector, Factories Department, Home Office.
- William Wilson, Chief Clerk, Establishments Department, Ministry of Labour.

Diplomatic Service And Overseas List

- Edward Lawrence Cockell, Voluntary worker in His Majesty's Legation at Commercial Counsellor's Office at Peking.
- Harold Armstrong Crouch MC Medical Inspector, Upper Nile Province, Sudan.
- James Dalton MBE late British Vice-Consul at Samarang.
- Charles Joseph Kavanagh, Commercial Secretary, Grade II, attached to His Majesty's Embassy at Berlin, on his retirement.
- Bernard Pelly, His Majesty's Consul at Seattle.

Colonies, Protectorates, etc.

- Pierre Adam, Nominated Member of the Council of Government, Mauritius.
- Christopher Francis Battiscombe, Private Secretary to His Highness the Sultan of Zanzibar.
- The Venerable Archdeacon Samuel Edmund Branch lately Headmaster of the Antigua Grammar School. For services to education.
- Alfred Herbert Crook Headmaster of Queen's College, Hong Kong.
- Banner Carruthers Johnstone, Provincial Commissioner, Zanzibar.
- Joseph Jones, formerly Curator of the Botanic Gardens, Dominica.
- Sydney Hubert La Fontaine DSO MC District Officer, Kenya.
- William Alfred Stedwell Lamborn MRCS LRCP Medical Entomologist, Nyasaland Protectorate.
- Arthur Alexander Legat, Manager of the National Bank of India in Kenya Colony. For public services.
- Captain Cyril Charles Lilley, District Commissioner, Gold Coast. For services on the Anglo-French Togoland Boundary Commission.
- Frederick Claud Marriott, Director of Education, Colony of Trinidad and Tobago.
- Leon Emile Pitot, Chairman of the Board of Commissioners, Curepipe, Mauritius.
- Charles Johnston Smith Senior Surgeon, Singapore.
- William Tait-Bowie. For public services in the Nyasaland Protectorate.

British India

- Subrahmanya Ranganathan, Indian Civil Service, formerly Agent of the Government of India in Ceylon.
- Piyara Mirza, Provincial Civil Service, Bihar and Orissa (retired).
- William Robert Mustoe, Superintendent, Horticultural Operations, Delhi.
- Ernest Samuel George Chivers, Military Engineer Services, Karachi.
- Arthur Gordon Shoosmith, Architect, Delhi.
- Harry William Hogg, Provincial Secretary, Boy Scouts Association, Punjab.

==== Member of the Order of the British Empire (MBE) ====
Civil Division

- John Aikman, Assistant, Royal Botanic Gardens, Kew.
- Henry Allen Armitage, Clerk to the Gloucester Board of Guardians; Member of the Council of the Poor Law Unions Association.
- Emily Bambridge, First Glass. Clerk, Ministry of Health.
- Ralph Patterson Barrass, Relieving Officer, Houghton-le-Spring Board of Guardians
- Ernest Arthur Bearder FIC Technical Adviser, Dyestuffs Advisory Licensing Committee.
- Thomas Henry Beckett, Principal Clerk, Works and Casual Wards Department, Metropolitan Asylums Board.
- Ernest Hick Bennett, Staff Officer, Treasury.
- William George Tabor Blois, General Secretary, The National Federation of Meat Traders Associations.
- Albert Harry Boyd, Clerical Officer, Higher Grade, Colonial Office.
- Helen Florence-Butler, Assistant Accountant, Ministry of Health.
- John Carr, Esq., Chief Superintendent and Deputy Chief Constable, Newcastle upon Tyne City Police.
- Thomas Guthrie Carr, Chairman of the Newcastle, Hexham and District War Pensions Committee.
- Samuel Charles Castleton, Second Class Officer, South Eastern Divisional Office, Ministry of Labour.
- John Albert Concannon, Superintendent, Metropolitan Police.
- Mary Inglis Davidson Coutts, Member of the Aberdeen, Banff and Kincardine War Pensions Committee.
- Charles Crouch, Staff Officer, Board of Inland Revenue.
- Frederick Charles Dixon, Chief Engineer, S.S. Haiching, Hong Kong. For valuable services and personal bravery in frustrating attempted piracy.
- Thomas Garrard Ellison, Assistant Engineer, Grade II, Office of Works.
- Lucy Emmerson, Secretary Shorthand Typist, Home Office.
- Thomas Ennion, Superintendent, Cheshire County Constabulary.
- Jane Elizabeth Firth (Sister Clare (S.N.D.)), Head Mistress of Notre Dame Roman Catholic Central School, Liverpool.
- Henry Roland Godfrey, Staff Clerk, Secretariat, War Office. Arthur Allan Gomme, Librarian, Patent Office, Board of Trade.
- Frank Albert Hollis, Head Master, Cooper Endowed School, Tewin, Hertfordshire.
- Elsie Hughes, Secretary to the Rt. Hon. Lord Dawson of Penn GCVO KCB KCMG FRCP Physician in Ordinary to His Majesty the King. For services, during His Majesty's recent illness.
- Alan Frederick Johnson, Second Officer, S.S. Haiching, Hong Kong. For valuable services and personal bravery in frustrating attempted piracy.
- James William Johnson, Chairman of the Southampton, Isle-of-Wight, Winchester and District War Pensions Committee.
- George Chessor Leith, Senior Valuation Clerk, Board of Inland Revenue.
- Harriet Mary Lloyd, Co-opted Member of the Atchain Board of Guardians.
- Lieutenant James Malcolm Maguire RN (Retired), District Officer, His Majesty's Coastguard.
- Henry Sutcliffe Marshall, Senior Executive Officer, Secretary's Office, Board of Customs and Excise.
- Dorothy Morgan, Member of Liverpool Board of Guardians.
- William George Morris, Contracts Officer, War Office.
- Charles Albert Pearce MC Permanent Salaried Officer, Ministry of Pensions.
- George James Prentice, Superintending Clerk, Accountant-General's Department, Admiralty.
- Percy Vaughan Frederick Raffaelli, Senior Staff Officer, Ministry of Pensions.
- Tom Robinson, First Class Officer, Blackburn Employment Exchange.
- Ernest Edward Rogers Examiner of Technical Accounts, Electrical Engineering Department, Admiralty.
- Arthur Goulborn Sandison, Assistant to Comptroller of Accounts, Office of Works.
- Constance Eveline Shirley, Superintendent of Typists, Mines Department.
- Joseph Smith, Head Master, Millfields Road Mixed School, Hackney.
- Edith Lewis Sully, Woman Pension Officer, Board of Customs and Excise.
- Henry Lester Butler Tarrant, Chief Clerk, Meteorological Office, Air Ministry.
- James Thomson, Chief Constable, Forfar Burgh Police.
- Councillor James Albert Webb JP Chairman of the Salford Board of Guardians.

Diplomatic Service And Overseas List

- Paul Bonett, late Treasurer of the Maltese Benevolent Fund, Alexandria.
- Daniel Francis Horseman Brickell, His Majesty's Vice-Consul at Cairo.
- Maud Elise Carter, Inspectress, Egyptian Ministry of Education.
- Alfred Cavanagh, Chief Clerk, Sudan Government Railways and Steamers.
- Theodore Harold Fox, British Vice-Consul at Philadelphia.
- Henry Godfrey Wedderburn-Maxwell, Assistant District Commissioner, Upper Nile Province, Sudan.
- John Webb Witty, British Vice-Consul at Barcelona.

British India

- Frank Ernest Brann Pool, Provincial Civil Service, Punjab.
- Major Alfred Baldwin Desouza, Indian Medical Department, Resident Medical Officer, Gokuldas Tejpal Hospital, Bombay.
- William McKenzie Mather, Private Secretary to the High Commissioner for India.
- John Carter, Officer Supervisor, Office of the Assistant Military Secretary to the Commander-in-Chief.
- Dudley Hope Joseph Nicholas, Indian Medical Department, in charge of Government House Dispensary, Madras.
- Khan Bahadur Abdur Rahim, Vice-President, Cantonment Board, Secunderabad, Hyderabad, Deccan.
- John Munro, Works Assistant, Delhi.
- Henry Francis Wilson, Works Assistant, Delhi.
- Rai Bahadur Thakur Jaswant Singh, Rajapur, Banda District, United Provinces.

Colonies, Protectorates, etc.

- Ethel Armistead, Principal of the Wesleyan Girls Boarding School, Kandy Island of Ceylon.
- Frank Cecil Clarkson, Commissioner of the Virgin Islands.
- Eva Cotching For infant welfare work at Haifa, Palestine.
- Janet Dempster Cranston. For infant welfare and Girl Guide work in the Gold Coast.
- Ethel Harrison, Lady Superintendent in charge of the Northrup McMillan Nurses Institute, Kenya Colony.
- Joseph Edward James, Local Inspector of Schools, Presidency of Saint Christopher and Nevis.
- Edgar Jullienne, Clerk of the Executive Council and Council of Government, Mauritius.
- John Young McFadyen Magistrate and Medical Officer, Anguilla Island, Presidency of Saint Christopher and Nevis.
- Francis Garcier Morgan, Cashier, Treasury, Seychelles.
- Elias Peter Prince, formerly Chief Clerk, Forest Department, Cyprus.
- Commander Cecil Graham Tonge RD RNR (Retired), Marine Superintendent, Nyasaland Protectorate.
- Ernest William Gaine Twentyman, Harbour Master, Suva, Fiji.
- Rene Viader, Second Assistant Colonial Secretary, Mauritius.
- Edgar Herbert Warren, Comptroller of Customs, Nyasaland Protectorate.

=== Members of the Order of the Companions of Honour (CH) ===
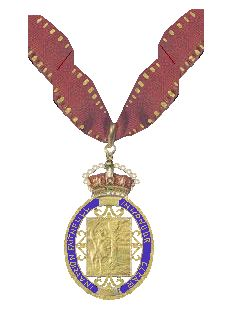
The riband and badge of the "Companions of Honour"

- Agnes Maude Royden, Eminent in the religious life of the nation.
- The Right Honourable Valangiman Sankarayarayana Srinivasa Sastri. For eminent services in Indian affairs and as first incumbent of the post of Agent of the Government of India in South Africa.
- Gertrude Mary Tuckwell JP Member of the Advisory Committee to the Lord Chancellor for Women Justices of the Peace; Member of the Women's Central Committee on Women's Training and Employment; Member of the Executive of the Magistrates Association.

=== Kaisar-i-Hind Medal ===
First Class

- Norman George Armstrong Edgley, Indian Civil Service, Assam.
- Diwan Bahadur Jamiat Rai CIE, Provincial Civil Service, Baluchistan (retired).
- The Reverend Samuel Day Bawden, American Baptist Mission, Manager of the Reformatory Settlement, Kavali Nellore District, Madras.
- The Reverend Robert Halliday, American Baptist Talaing Mission, Moulmein, Burma.
- Julia Florence Hibberd, Honorary Lady Superintendent, Sandes Soldiers Home, Rawalpindi and Upper Topa.
- The Reverend William Henry Jackson, the Blind School, Kemmendine, Burma.
- Sister Josephine, All Saints Sisterhood, Sister-in-Charge, Jamsetji Jeejeebhoy Hospital, Bombay.
- Mary Longmire Lady Doctor in charge of the Church of England Zenana Missionary Society Hospital, Khammamett, Hyderabad, Deccan.
- The Reverend William Sinclair Sutherland, Superintendent, Lady Willingdon Leper Settlement, Chingleput, Madras.

=== British Empire Medal (BEM) ===
Military Division
For Gallantry

- Midshipman Anthony John Cobham RN
- Able Seaman George Paterson Niven RN Citation: "On the 26th July, 1929, H.M.S. Devonshire, was carrying out full calibre firing, when at the first salvo there was a heavy explosion which blew off the roof of one of the turrets. When the explosion occurred, Midshipman A. J. Cobham immediately took stretcher parties aft and ordered one crew to follow him and the other crews to rig hoses. On reaching the turret he assisted men who were coming out of it with their clothes on fire, and took charge of the work of extinguishing the flames, getting them into stretchers etc. He followed the gunnery officer into the turret when the latter first went in and remained in the gun house until all necessary work was completed. He displayed marked initiative, coolness and pluck for an officer of his age. Able Seaman G. P. Niven, entered the turret shortly after Midshipman Cobham and helped to evacuate wounded. He followed the gunnery officer down to the pump room, saying "I'm not going to let him go down alone." After this officer had returned to the gun house, Able Seaman Niven heard someone call from below and went right down to the shell handing room to see what was wanted."

For Meritorious Service

- Corporal Arthur Henry Newman, Royal Army Medical Corps.
- Sergeant (Pilot) Maurice Edward Hearn, Royal Air Force.

Civil Division
For Meritorious Service

- Annie Elizabeth Davies, Lady Superintendent, Manchester Prison.
- Albert Edward Fox, Constable, Lancashire County Constabulary.
- Alfred Charles Hayler, Chief Superintendent of Warehousemen, Board of Inland Revenue.
- Frederick Hale Murfitt, Principal Artificer, National Physical Laboratory.
- Charles Edward Renno, Assistant Foreman Printer, Ordnance Committee, Royal Arsenal, Woolwich.
- Henry Edwin Scrivener, Assistant Commander, Metropolitan Special Constabulary.
- William George Wilkinson, Class II, Chief Officer at Borstal Institution.
- Aliki, Member of the Harbour Master's boat's crew, Suva, Fiji.
- Aminisitai, Member of the Harbour Master's boat's crew, Suva, Fiji.

=== Air Force Cross ===
- Flight Lieutenant Edward Goodwin Hilton DFC AFC (Awarded a Bar to the Air Force Cross)
- Flight Lieutenant John McFarlane MC

=== Air Force Medal ===
- Flight Sergeant Joseph Edgar Brown.

=== King's Police Medal (KPM) ===
England and Wales

- Henry Daniel Morgan OBE Chief Constable, Metropolitan Police.
- Arthur Frederick Nicholson OBE Chief Constable, Exeter City Police.
- Charles Edmund Harriss, Chief Constable, Lancaster City Police.
- Lionel Decimus Longcroft Everett OBE Chief Constable, Liverpool City Police.
- Charles Robert Clark, Superintendent, Metropolitan Police.
- Robert Heath, Chief Superintendent, Staffordshire Constabulary.
- Ernest Boshier, Superintendent, Surrey Constabulary.
- John Henderson MBE Superintendent and Deputy Chief Constable, North Riding Constabulary.
- Thomas Horton MBE Superintendent, West Riding Constabulary.
- Richard Thomas, Superintendent, Manchester City Police.
- Edward Michael Ockey, Detective Inspector, Metropolitan Police.
- Herbert North, Inspector, Hull City Police Fire Brigade.
- Charles Bacon, Sergeant, Metropolitan Police.
- Henry Beacham, Constable, Metropolitan Police.
- James Cole, Constable, Metropolitan Police.
- Harry Hall, Constable, Metropolitan Police.
- Albert Highgate, Constable, Metropolitan Police.
- Reginald Granville Jones, Constable, Metropolitan Police.
- Ronald King Lovejoy, Constable, Metropolitan Police.
- Thomas Braithwaite, Constable, Lancashire Constabulary.
- William James Wooff, Constable, Lancashire Constabulary.
- John Muse Branthwaite, formerly Constable, Metropolitan Police.
- Charles Wright Tozer, Second Officer, Birmingham Fire Brigade.

Scotland

- Alexander Wesley Christie, Chief Constable, Airdrie Burgh Police.
- Alexander Marr MBE Chief Constable, Montrose Burgh Police.
- Ronald Irvine, Constable, Lanarkshire Constabulary.
- Peter McGregor, Constable, Glasgow City Police.
- Robert Rathney, Constable, Glasgow City Police.

Northern Ireland

- James Heather, Second Officer, Newry Fire Brigade.

Australia

- Ernest Budgen, Foot Constable, South Australian Police Force.
- John Clement King, Foot Constable, South Australian Police Force.
- William Richard Taylor, Sergeant, Police Force, Tasmania.

Union of South Africa

- Cornelius Stephanus Rademeyer, Constable, South African Police Force.

British India

- Frederick William O'Gorman, Superintendent, Bombay Police. (Bar to the King's Police Medal)
- Ramnad Perumal Nayudu Krishnaswami Nayudu, Head Constable, Madras Police.
- Trichinopoly S. Kannuswami Nayudu Krishnaswami Nayudu, Probationary Head Constable, Madras Police.
- Saiyid Hussain, Sub-Inspector, Madras Police.
- Sadashiv Rajba Rane, Constable, Bombay City Police.
- Claude Harold Klein, Inspector, Bombay City Police.
- Muhammad Din Khan, Constable, Eastern Bengal and Assam Bengal Railway Police.
- Abdus Subhan, Officiating Assistant Sub-Inspector, Bengal Police.
- Raja Ram Ahir, Constable, Bengal Police.
- Upendra Nath Datta, Officiating Inspector, Bengal Police.
- Muhamad Ishaq Naik, United Provinces Police.
- Denis Arthur MacKaura McCarthy, Assistant Superintendent, United Provinces Police.
- Kazim Raza, Assistant Superintendent, United Provinces Police.
- Safdar Ali, Officiating Inspector, Punjab Police.
- Asa Singh, Constable, Punjab Police.
- Munir Khan, Constable, Punjab Police.
- Francis McElligott, District Superintendent, Burma Police.
- Khan Bahadur Jalal Din, Naib-Commandant, Burma Military Police.
- Henry Forsyth Reynolds, District Superintendent, Burma Police.
- Captain Cyril Leslie Dunn Assistant Commandant, Burma Military Police.
- Ratan Bir Lama, Havildar, Burma Military Police.
- Makerdhoj Limbu, Naik, Burma Military Police.
- Thomas Allen Daff, Superintendent Bihar and Orissa Police.
- Gordon Shelley Lightfoot, Assistant Superintendent of Police, Assam.
- Ernest Ridley Taylor, Superintendent, North-West Frontier Province Police.
- Ghulam Rasal, Constable, North-West Frontier Province Police.
- M. Yarak Khan, Sub-Inspector, Baluchistan Police.
- Rai Bahadur Lala Bhagwan Das MVO Indian Police Service.
- Michael Francis Cleary, Indian Police Service.
- William Cecil Edwards, Superintendent of Police, Western India States Agency.
- Sardar Gurdial Singh Dhillon, Superintendent of Police, Patiala State.

His Majesty Has also graciously consented to the King's Police Medal being handed to the next-of-kin of the undermentioned officer, who was killed on the 28th March, 1929, and would have received the decoration had he survived:

- Jiwan Singh, Naik, United Provinces Police.

Colonies, Protectorates and Mandated Territories

- Mehta Prithri Chand, Chief Inspector of Police, Straits Settlements.
- Cherag Din, Subedar Major, Federated Malay States Police.
- Nicolas Haji Georghiou, Lance Corporal, Cyprus Military Police.
- Salesi Sivaro, Constable, Fiji Constabulary.
- Roy Godfrey Bullen Spacer MC Commissioner of Police, Kenya.
- Tang Chew, Detective, Federated Malay States Police.

=== Royal Red Cross (RRC) ===
First Class

- Superintending Sister Nita Courtice ARRC
- Superintending Sister Marguerite M. Abraham ARRC

Second Class

- Nursing Sister Leonora G. Hooper.
- Nursing Sister Alice M. Shrewsbury.
