= Charles Hannigan =

Senior colonial police officer

Charles Hannigan ISO
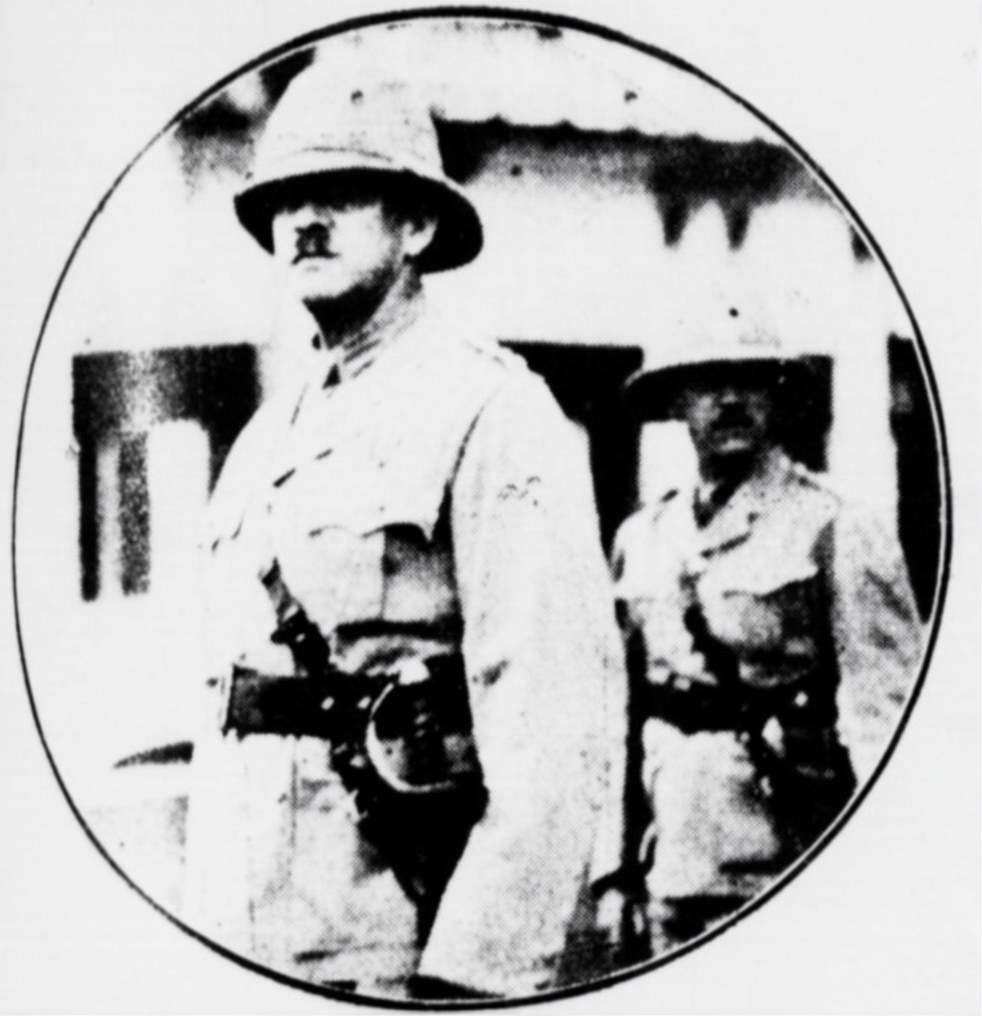

5th Commissioner of the Federated Malay States Police
- In office 1925–1931
- Preceded by: William Lance Conlay; Charles Henry Sansom (Acting)
- Succeeded by: Charles Henry Sansom

Personal details
- Born: 1 December 1877 Rathdowney, Queen's County
- Died: Unknown (after 1945)

Charles Hannigan ISO (born 1 December 1877) was an Irish native who was a senior colonial police officer who served as Commissioner of Police of the Federated Malay States Police in the 1920s.

== Early life and education ==
Charles Hannigan was born on 1 December 1877 at Rathdowney, Queen's County, and was educated at Ranelagh School, Athlone.

== Career ==
Hannigan began his career in 1896 serving in the Royal Irish Constabulary.

In 1902, he went to Malaya and joined the police force of the Federated Malay States beginning as 2nd Class Inspector, and was promoted to 1st Class three years later. In 1906, he was appointed Acting Assistant Commissioner attached to the detective branch and was sent from Kuala Lumpur to Kuala Kubu where he was involved in the arrest of the notorious robber Wee Chan.

In 1907, he worked as Registrar of Criminals and was later appointed Adjutant of the Police Department, before he became Assistant Commissioner of Police in Ipoh where, in 1915, he helped hunt down a gang which had been terrorising Kinta for several years. He then spent a short time as Chief Police Officer in Pahang.

In 1919, he was transferred to Singapore where he was appointed Chief Police Officer, Singapore as Acting Superintendent, and later CPO as Superintendent, and was involved in the anti-Japanese riots when martial law was declared and troops were employed to restore order. On two occasions he acted as Inspector General of the Straits Settlements Police.

In 1924, he returned to the Federated Malay States as Commissioner of Police, the highest police rank, where he remained for six years. During his tenure he was credited with reforming and improving the police force, and introducing modern methods such as the creation of a Criminal Registry. Before retiring in 1931, in his last report he wrote that the economic depression had led to a sharp rise in crime as a consequence of large numbers of workers having been laid off in the tin mines and on the rubber plantations who turned to theft, burglary and gang-robbery to obtain a livelihood.

In 1931, he retired to England, but the following year was offered a position reorganising the police force of Sarawak where he was employed for a year before he returned again to England. When the Second World War broke out he moved to Ireland but returned to live in Buckinghamshire in 1946.

== Honours and legacy ==
In 1927, Hannigan was awarded the King's Police Medal. In 1933, he received the Companion of the Imperial Service Order (ISO).

Hannigan Road in Kuala Lumpur was named after him.
