= Frank Caldwell =

Frank Caldwell may refer to:

- Frank Caldwell (British Army officer)
- Frank W. Caldwell, American propeller engineer and designer
- Frank Merrill Caldwell, United States Army general
- James F. Caldwell Jr., known as Frank, United States Navy admiral

== See also ==
- Francis Caldwell, British police officer
- Francis Xavier Caldwell, businessman and political figure in Upper Canada
