= William Lance Conlay =

British colonial administrator

William Lance Conlay CBE
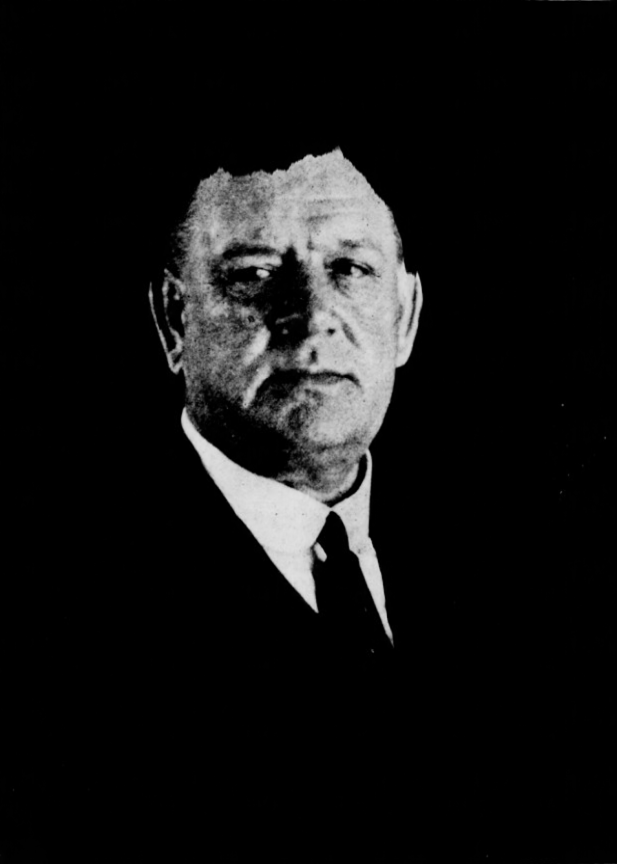

4th Commissioner of the Federated Malay States Police
- In office 1914–1924
- Preceded by: William Willes Douglas
- Succeeded by: Charles Henry Sansom

Personal details
- Born: 21 June 1869
- Died: 3 January 1927 (aged 57) England
- Spouse: Georgiana Maude Archbold (married 15 January 1902)

Military service
- Branch/service: 1st Battalion Perak Sikhs
- Battles/wars: Pahang Expedition

William Lance Conlay CBE (21 June 1869 – 3 January 1927) was a British colonial administrator and Commissioner of Police of the Federated Malay States from 1916 to 1925. Conlay is well-known as the inventor of the "Conlay System," which was a system for fingerprinting and fingerprint identification.

== Early life ==
William Lance Conlay was born on 21 June 1869, and joined the 21st Hussars and was posted to India.

== Career ==
In 1893, he arrived in the Federated Malay States, was appointed Inspector of the 1st Battalion Perak Sikhs, and took part in an expedition to Pahang where he remained until 1902. Whilst in Pahang he held various appointments: acting Junior Officer, Ulu Pahang (1897), acting District Officer, Temerloh and Kuantan (1898), and Assistant District Officer, Rompin and Kuantan(1899).

In 1902, he entered the Federal Service as Assistant Commissioner of Police and Superintendent of Prisons, Negeri Sembilan, in the same year was appointed Assistant Commissioner of Police, Selangor, and in 1904, served in the same position in Kinta.

In 1907, he was the first to be appointed to the newly created post of British Agent, Terengganu. In 1910, he was appointed Acting Police Commissioner, Perak, in 1914 was promoted to Acting Commissioner of Police for the Federated Malay States Police (FMS Police), and in 1916 was appointed to the substantive position of Commissioner of Police, Federated Malay States, remaining in the post until his retirement in 1924.

During his nine year term as Commissioner of Police of the Federated Malay States he is credited with modernising the police force and improving its efficiency. He created a new criminal registry system, introduced modern finger-printing techniques, and gave to the police in the Malay language the Penal Code, Criminal Procedure Code, Evidence Ordinance and the Drill Book.

== The Conlay System ==
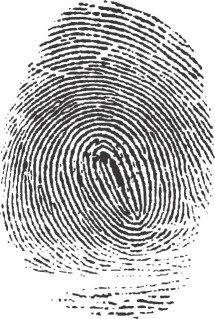
The Conlay System was a fingerprint identification system that was employed for decades.

In 1904, while working in the FMS Police, Conlay was on leave in England, when he was ordered to report to New Scotland Yard to study the Henry System of fingerprint identification, which had been devised by Edward Henry. Conlay thought this system was inadequate, and devised his own system. After sending his methodology up the chain of command, the Home Secretary sent it to Henry for review, who said that the system held no advantage over his own system. After the rejection, Conlay introduced the Henry System to the FMS Police. Six months later, however, the Conlay System was trialed.

It was deemed superior to the Henry System in nearly every way. One fingerprinting expert wrote that while the Henry System took seven years to master, the Conlay System could be taught in a few weeks. The Conlay System broke up fingerprints into three main groups: Whorls, Loops, and Arches.

After the system was adopted by the British Empire, it was imported into the United States by Fleck, where it was adopted as the "Conlay-Fleck System."

== Death and legacy ==
In 1925, the year after his retirement, he was awarded the CBE, and King's Police Medal. He died on 3 January 1927 in England.

A memorial plaque was erected in his honour in the police headquarters in Kuala Lumpur in 1930, and Conlay Road and Conlay MRT Station in Kuala Lumpur was named after him.
