= Lionel Everett =

British police officer

Lionel Everett OBE KPM
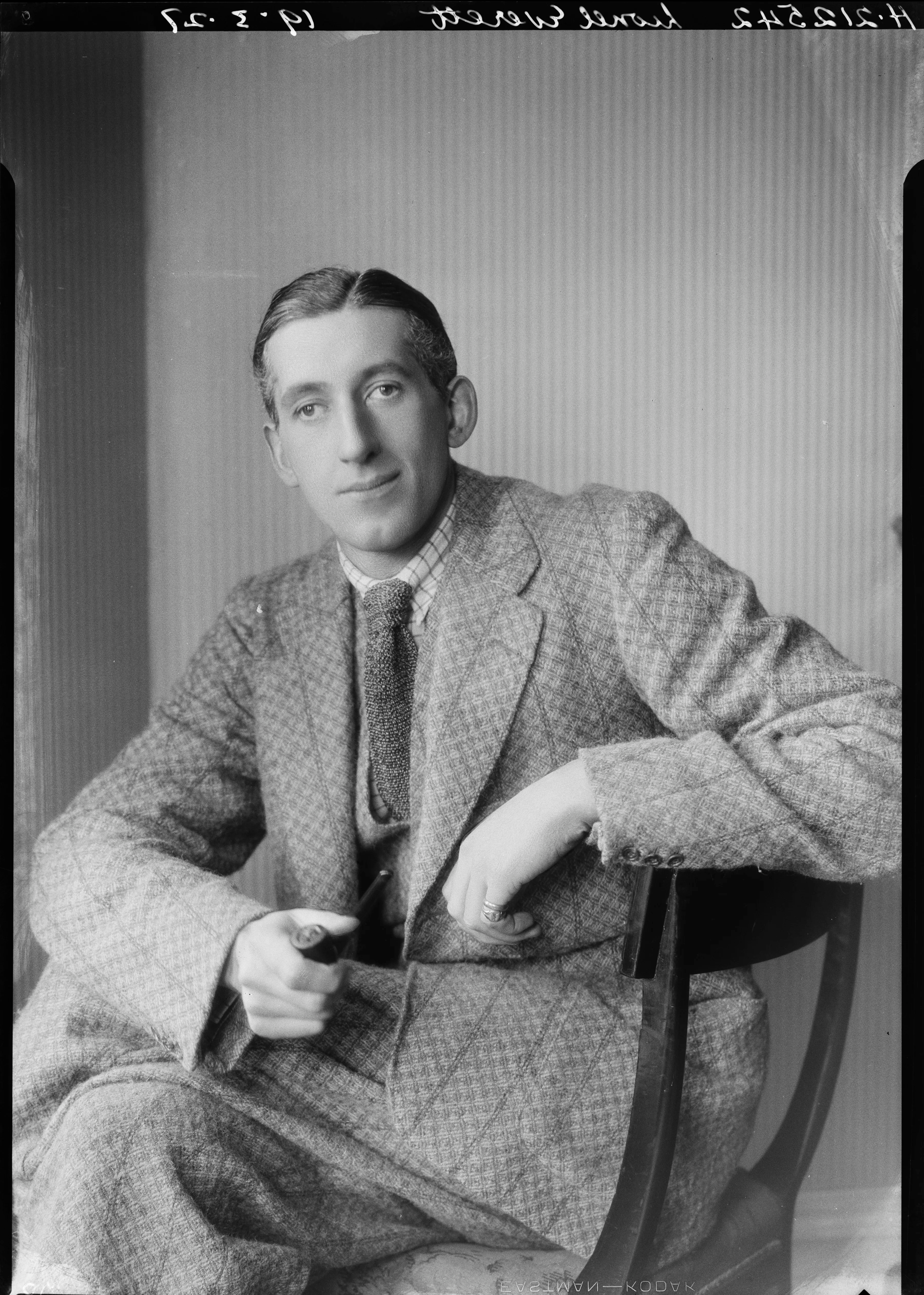
- Everett in 1927

Chief Constable of Liverpool City Police
- In office 1925–1931

Personal details
- Born: Lionel Decimus Longcroft Everett; 17 June 1877 Swindon, Wiltshire, England
- Died: 12 February 1941 (aged 63)

Lionel Decimus Longcroft Everett OBE KPM (17 June 1877 – 12 February 1941) was a British police officer who served as chief constable of Liverpool City Police from 1925 to 1931.

Everett joined the Wiltshire County Constabulary as a constable at the age of 18. He served his first eighteen months in the chief constable's office and was then posted to Swindon, where he was promoted to sergeant eighteen months later. He was promoted to inspector in 1902 and senior inspector at Swindon in 1903. In 1911 he was promoted to superintendent and took over the Devizes division. In 1913 he became chief constable of Preston Borough Police and in 1917 first assistant head constable of Liverpool City Police. He resigned from the police in November 1931 due to ill-health.

Everett was appointed Officer of the Order of the British Empire (OBE) in the 1920 civilian war honours, particularly in connection with the suppression of anti-German riots during the First World War. He was awarded the King's Police Medal (KPM) in the 1930 New Year Honours.

Police appointments
Preceded by Francis Caldwell	Chief Constable of Liverpool; 1925–1931	Succeeded by A. K. Wilson
