= Francis Caldwell =

British police officer

Francis Caldwell CBE MVO KPM
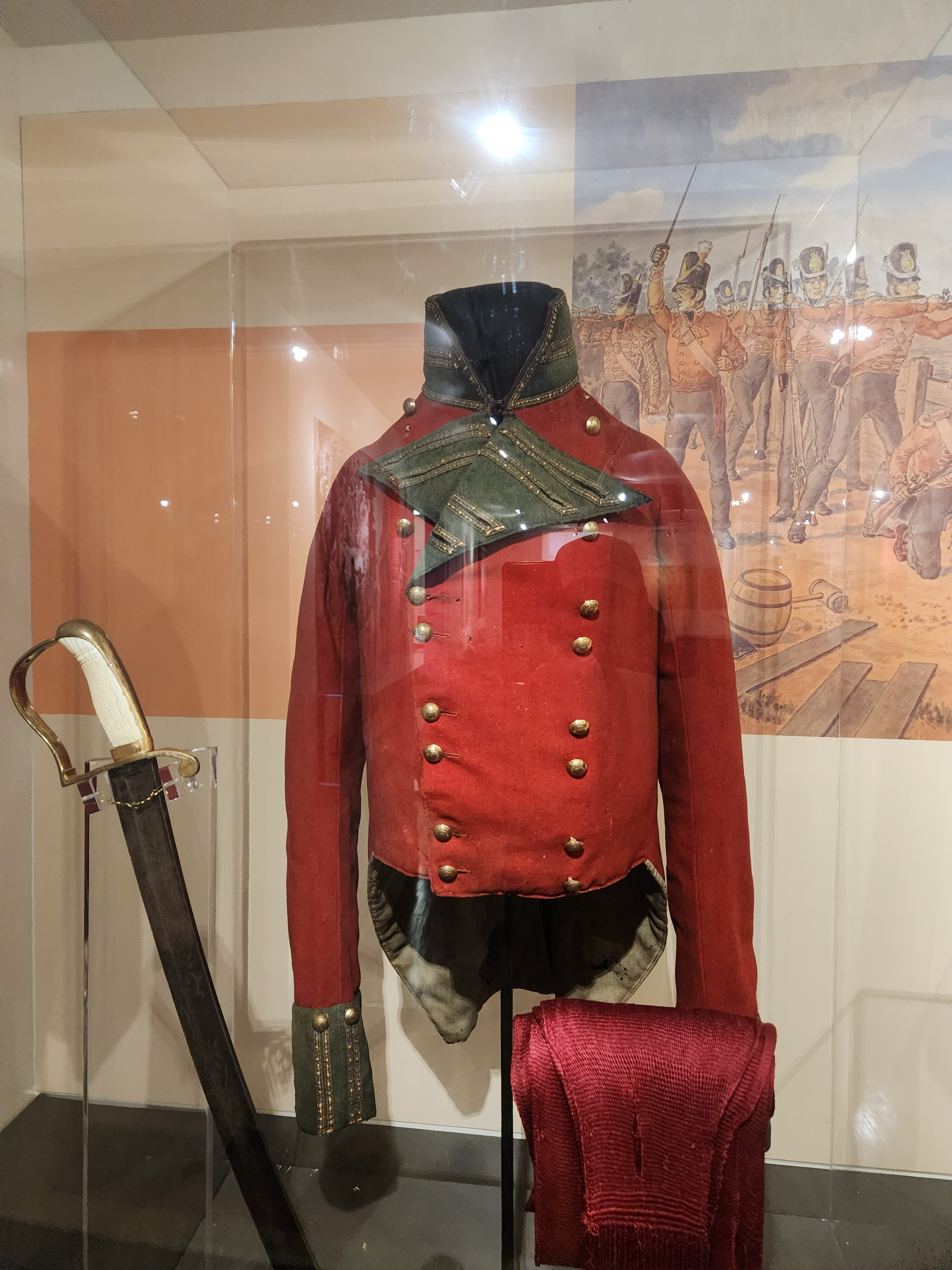
- Lieutenant Francis Caldwell's coat, sabre and sash

Head Constable of Liverpool City Police
- In office January 1912 – 1925

Personal details
- Born: 1860 Croxteth, Liverpool, England
- Died: 17 April 1934 (aged 73–74)

Francis Caldwell CBE MVO KPM (1860 – 17 April 1934) was a British police officer who served as Head Constable of Liverpool City Police from 1912 to 1925.

Caldwell was born in Croxteth to Francis Brown Caldwell, an accountant from Ayrshire, Scotland and James Caldwell from West Derby. He joined the Liverpool police as a clerk in 1879 and rapidly rose through the ranks to First Assistant Head Constable, succeeding Sir Leonard Dunning as Head Constable (the equivalent of Chief Constable in most other British forces) in January 1912.

Caldwell was appointed Member of the Royal Victorian Order 5th Class (MVO) in 1913 and Commander of the Order of the British Empire (CBE) in the 1920 civilian war honours. He was awarded the King's Police Medal (KPM) in the 1919 New Year Honours.

He died at the age of 74.

Police appointments
Preceded by Leonard Dunning	Head Constable of Liverpool; 1912–1925	Succeeded by Lionel Everett
