= J. Venkatanarayana Naidu =

Diwan Bahadur Jannyavula Venkatanarayana Rao Naidu CIE (1870–1955) was an Indian civil servant, writer and politician who served as Commissioner of Madras city from 1925 to 1928.

== Career ==
Naidu joined the civil service after obtaining a degree in law and served as District Collector, magistrate and Inspector-General of Registration for the Madras Presidency before being appointed Commissioner of Chief Executive Officer of Madras. Venkatanarayana Naidu also served as Secretary to the Law Department of the Government of Madras from 1928 to 1930.

== Honours ==
Venkatanarayana Naidu was made a Rao Sahib in 1920 and Diwan Bahadur in 1923. Upon retirement in 1930, Naidu was made a Companion of the Order of the Indian Empire. He also published many works on Indian philosophy.

Venkatanarayana Road, a popular thoroughfare in T. Nagar, Chennai, is named in his memory.

== Personal life ==
Naidu's son J. V. P. Rao was an automobile pioneer who served as General Manager of Addison's from 1949 to 1977. He was instrumental in bringing out the Morris Minor, the first car assembled in Madras, on 15 November 1950.

== Works ==
- The Hinduism of the Upanishads. Madras Publishing House. 1950.
