= Charles Henry Sansom =

British barrister and senior colonial police officer (1886-1949)

Charles Henry Sansom CMG CBE
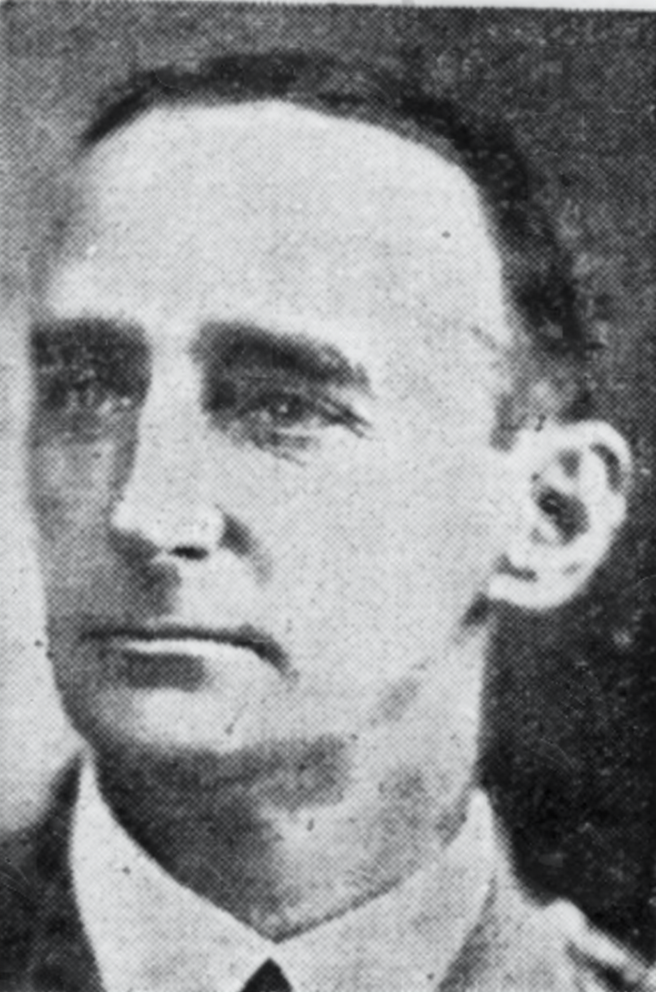

Commissioner of Police, Hong Kong
- In office 1945–1946
- Appointed by: British Military Administration (Malaya)

1st Inspector-General of the Federated Malay States Police
- In office 1935–1939
- Preceded by: Self, as Commissioner of Police
- Succeeded by: Edward Bagot

6th Commissioner of the Federated Malay States Police
- In office 1931–1935
- Preceded by: Self, as Inspector-General
- Succeeded by: Charles Hannigan

Chief Police Officer, Singapore
- In office: November 1925 – December 1925; October 1926 – August 1928; December 1929 – May 1930

Personal details
- Born: 14 January 1886
- Died: 29 December 1947 (aged 61)

Charles Henry Sansom CMG, CBE (14 January 1886 – 29 December 1947) was a barrister and senior colonial police officer who served in Malaya and Hong Kong.

== Early life and education ==
Sansom, who was born on 14 January 1886, was the son of Louis Sansom J.P. He was educated at Plymouth College.

== Career ==
In 1905, Sansom joined the Federated Malay States Police as a probationer, and in 1908, was appointed Acting Commissioner of Police, rising to become Assistant Commissioner of Police and Registrar of Criminals of the Federated Malay States and the Straits Settlements Police Force.

In 1923, he was called to the Bar by the Inner Temple, and later that year was appointed Commissioner of Police in Johore. In 1925, after taking the senior police officer's course at Scotland Yard, he was appointed Chief Police Officer in Singapore remaining in the post until 1930, having in 1927, and 1928, also acted as Inspector General. In 1930, he was Chief Police Officer in Perak, and the following year was promoted to Inspector-General of Police for the Federated Malay States, remaining in the post until his retirement in 1939.

Upon on the outbreak of the Second World War in 1939, he trained as a warden in the Air Raid Precautions (A.R.P.). He was sent to Malta to organise the civil defence of the island serving as Chief A.R.P. Officer and Director of Compulsory Service, and for his leadership and brave conduct in the face of air raids was awarded the CBE. In 1944, he was attached to the Colonial Office.

In 1945, he was appointed Commissioner of Police in Hong Kong and retired, aged 60, to England the following year.

Sansom died on 29 December 1949.

== Personal life ==
In 1925, Sansom married Minnie Sophia Denham Godfrey, and they had a son and two daughters.

== Honours ==
Sansom was appointed Companion of the Order of St Michael and St George (CMG) in the 1938 New Year Honours. In 1942, he was awarded the Order of the British Empire (CBE).
