= Dockland Settlements =

The Docklands Settlements were a network of amenity centres in deprived areas of London, intended to meet the social and spiritual needs of the local population at a time when there was no public provision of such services. The settlements originated in 1894 with the foundation of the Malvern Mission in Canning Town, by the staff of Malvern College. Under the leadership of Reginald Kennedy-Cox and others, during the first half of the 20th century the Malvern Mission was greatly expanded. Renamed "Dockland Settlement No. 1", it became the hub from which subcentres were established throughout east London, and in several provincial cities. After the Second World War and the expansion of the Welfare State, the focus of activities changed; in the 1950s Dockland Settlement No. 1 became the Mayflower Centre, with overtly Christian aims. Other settlements continued to serve their communities (some of which were now far more prosperous) with a variety of social, sporting and cultural facilities, and were still functioning well into the 21st century.

== Origins and early years ==
A 1908 map of the Canning Town district of London. Vincent Street (unnamed) is in the top left-hand corner of the map.

In 1894, as part of a general movement in which English public schools and universities promoted social and religious work in deprived areas of London, the Malvern Mission was established at Vincent Street in Canning Town by Malvern College. The objective of these missions, was stated as "to carry on the church's work amongst her people from both a religious and a social point of view and to be a centre of religious influence and social good". A secondary purpose was to promote in boys and young men from more privileged backgrounds a sense of social responsibility towards the less fortunate. Among the Malvern schoolboys who spent part of their holidays working at the Malvern Mission was Reginald Kennedy-Cox, who would eventually devote his entire life to the work.

Vincent Street in Canning Town was by repute, in 1894, one of the worst streets in London. It was here, on a plot of ground provided by a supporter, that an iron mission church, St Alban and the English Martyrs, was built. The Revd G. F. Gillett was appointed as the first Missioner. The church became a centre for a number of clubs and societies meeting a variety of practical and spiritual needs. In 1905 Kennedy-Cox, who had achieved success as a playwright with several plays on the London stage, resumed his volunteer work at the mission. In 1907 he decided to commit himself fully to the venture, gave up his theatrical career became a full-time mission staff member. Life in the early years of the mission was described as follows:

"In those days the Mission consisted of a few dilapidated slum dwellings where the helpers lived and worked, and a tin-roofed chapel in charge of a clergyman known as the missioner. Each night the local lads would come in, and after some frolicing [sic] turn out the gaslight and have a free for all, breaking the furniture in the process; gradually, however, they came to respect the Mission and the voluntary staff and accept them as friends, and besides cards, draughts and other games in the small cramped rooms, were taught carpentry and boot repairing, though more often than not their boots were beyond repair. An employment bureau was started which kept contact with local employers, and jumble clothing was distributed as fast as it could be collected".

The development of the Mission was interrupted by the advent of war in 1914. Kennedy-Cox and many of the young men from the settlement joined the armed forces.

== Development and expansion ==
On his return from the war in 1918, Kennedy-Cox was appointed Warden of the Mission and began an ambitious programme of expansion. He used his contacts to obtain financial support from individuals and public bodies, and also devoted his own private resources to the work. In 1923 the Mission was re-established under a new constitution. It became the headquarters of a network of smaller centres established in London and the provinces, for which Kennedy-Cox devised the name "Dockland Settlements", with the former Malvern Mission renamed "Dockland Settlement No. 1". The programme of extensive rebuilding at Settlement No. 1 continued through the 1920s and early 1930s, and eventually included a large activities hall, a gymnasium a swimming pool, a theatre, a roof garden and additional residential accommodation. In 1929 the original iron chapel was replaced by a new building dedicated to St George and St Helena, designed by Geoffrey Raymond. Queen Mary was present at the chapel's dedication. In 1930 Kennedy-Cox was knighted for his charitable work. He retired as warden in 1937, and was succeeded by Ben Tinton, who had worked at the Settlement since 1918. After the outbreak of the Second World War, most activities at the various settlements ceased; many buildings were requisitioned by the military, and there was extensive bomb damage.

== Later history ==
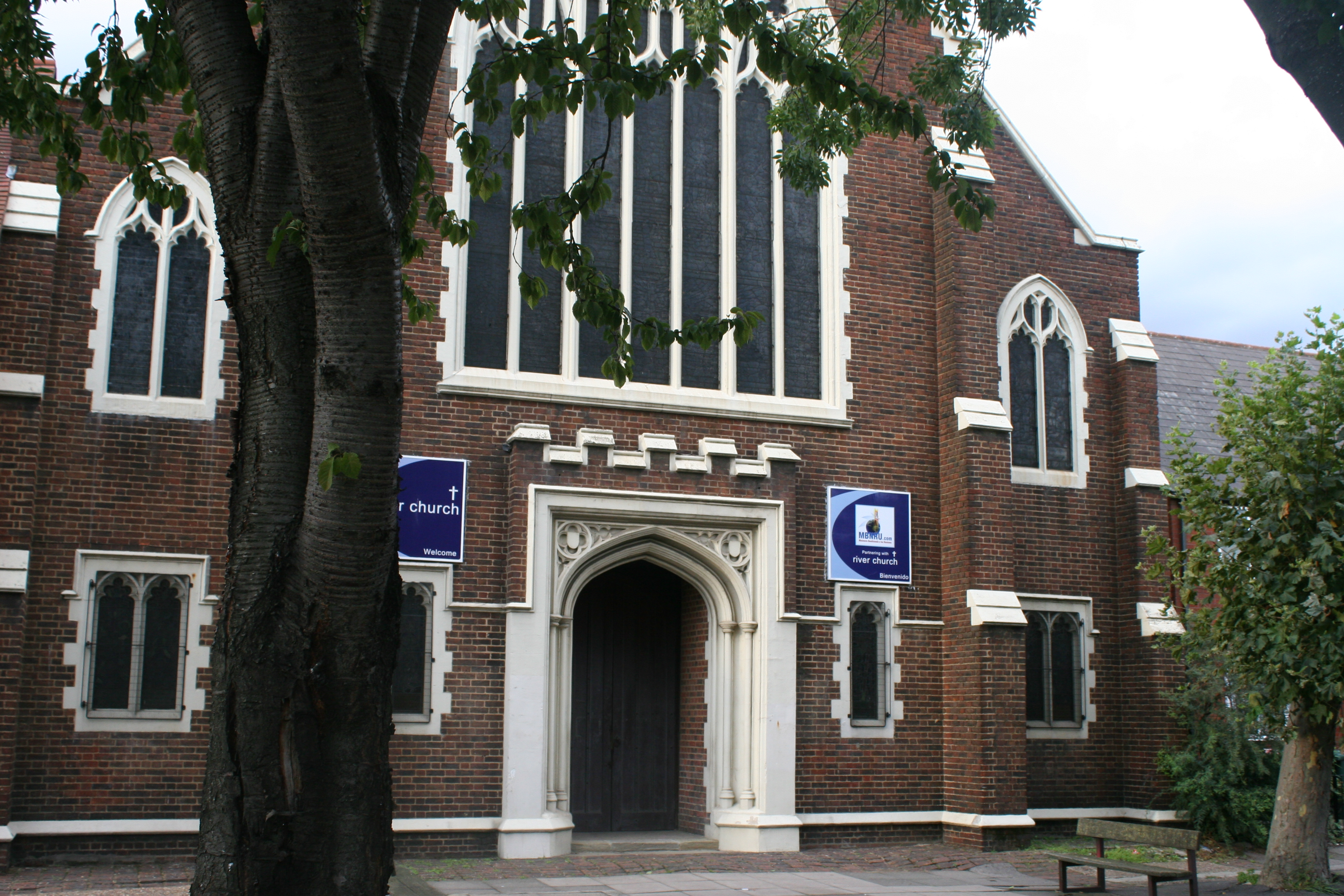
Chapel of St George and St Helena (now the River Church), Vincent Street, Canning Town

Dockland Settlement No. 1 and its satellites emerged from the war seriously weakened and in debt. Kennedy-Cox was persuaded to break his retirement to re-establish them on a sounder footing. By reducing the staff to a minimum and introducing strict economies he created the basis for a revival. However, by the 1950s the social and economic climate was changing; the advent of the welfare state and full employment rendered much of the settlements' traditional activities redundant. The focus changed to a Christian emphasis. An evangelical warden was appointed, bible classes were started, and staff positions were confined to Christians. At the same time, the public schools whose initiatives had initially helped to create the settlements were now revising their approaches to charitable work. In 1956 Malvern College ended its connection with the settlements; the same year, in a major downsizing operation, Settlement No. 1 was closed and the headquarters of the settlements organisation was moved to Stratford. Three London settlements remained: at Stratford, the Isle of Dogs, and Rotherhithe. Outside pre-1965 London there were settlements at Dagenham and Hainault in Essex and, further afield, at Bristol and Plymouth.

The work of the smaller settlements continued, in varying forms, into the 1960s and beyond, and although their functions were gradually taken over by local authorities, a few survived in some form into the 21st century. Dockland Settlement No. 1 was revived in 1958, following an initiative from the Bishop of Barking who, together with the former England cricketer The Revd David Sheppard, created the Mayflower Family Centre. The objectives of the new organisation were specifically Christian: "To serve the district in the name of Christ, trying to meet some of the some social and educational needs of Canning Town". The Mayflower Centre lasted until 2003, undergoing numerous changes of character along the way, until it merged with a local Elim Pentecostal Church to become the River Church and Centre. The other London settlements continued to operate. In 2005 Island History News reported: "If [Sir Reginald Kennedy-Cox] could return now he would be amazed at the new skyline of office blocks, but he would recognise the surrounding deprivation – the unemployment, the overcrowded homes, the lack of play facilities ... the work of the Dockland Settlements charity remains vital to the area".

The Carpenters and Dockland Centre remains in operation in Stratford, East London as a youth and community centre with sports facilities.
