= Reginald Kennedy-Cox =

British dramatist and social reformer

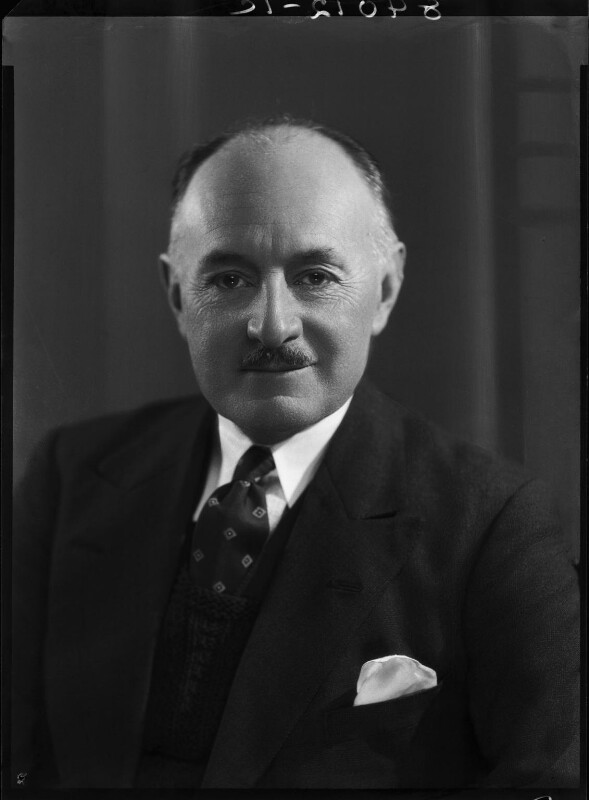
Kennedy-Cox in 1938

Sir Reginald Kennedy-Cox CBE, JP (18 April 1881 – 27 July 1966) was a British dramatist and social reformer, best known for his social work in the East End of London where he founded several Dockland Settlements.

Before he committed himself to this work he was a successful playwright, several of his works being performed on the London stage.

He was knighted in 1930 and appointed CBE in 1944.

== Career ==
Kennedy-Cox was born in 1881, the son of Reginald Cox and his wife Ada Harriette, née Kennedy. After attending Malvern College he studied at Hertford College, Oxford. On leaving the university he had some success as a dramatist; between 1904 and 1906 three of his plays were staged at the Royalty and London Coliseum theatres in London.

In 1905, he began work as a volunteer at the Malvern Settlement in the Canning Town district of London; the settlement had been founded in 1894 by Malvern College as a means whereby boys from the upper and middle classes could carry out social work among London's poor. In 1907, Kennedy-Cox joined the staff of the settlement.

During the First World War, he was commissioned into the Hampshire Regiment, and later served with the King's Royal Rifle Corps and at 27th Divisional headquarters, being mentioned in dispatches. After the war he returned to the Malvern Settlement as Warden and oversaw a period of considerable building and expansion.

The Malvern Settlement became "Dockland Settlement No. 1"; in the following years, using his private financial resources, Kennedy-Cox led an extension of the Dockland Settlements scheme into other areas of London, including Millwall, Rotherhithe and Stratford. Branch settlements were established in other cities.

For his work in this field, Kennedy-Cox was knighted in 1930. Sir Reginald retired from his full-time work in 1937.

During the Second World War he served as an army welfare officer at Southern Command, with the rank of colonel. In 1944 his war work earned him a CBE. After the war he returned to Canning Town to assist in the reconstruction of Settlement No. 1, whose buildings had been badly damaged by war. He also acted as chairman of the Salisbury Arts Theatre Board, and was a governor of Malvern College. He died at Salisbury on 27 July 1966. Sir Reginald had adopted a son who was killed during a London Blitz raid and is buried with him at All Saints' Church, Sutton Courtenay, Oxfordshire.

== Publications ==
Kennedy-Cox wrote two biographical books: An Autobiography, 1931 and The Happiest Man: Through the Dock Gates, 1939. He also wrote a history of the docklands area, Dockland Saga, 1955. Among his dramatic works were The Chetwynd Affair, Mary Stuart and The Marriage Brokers.
