= Federated Malay States Police =

Police force of the Federated Malay States (1896–1942)

Federated Malay States Police Pasukan Polis Negeri-Negeri Melayu Bersekutu
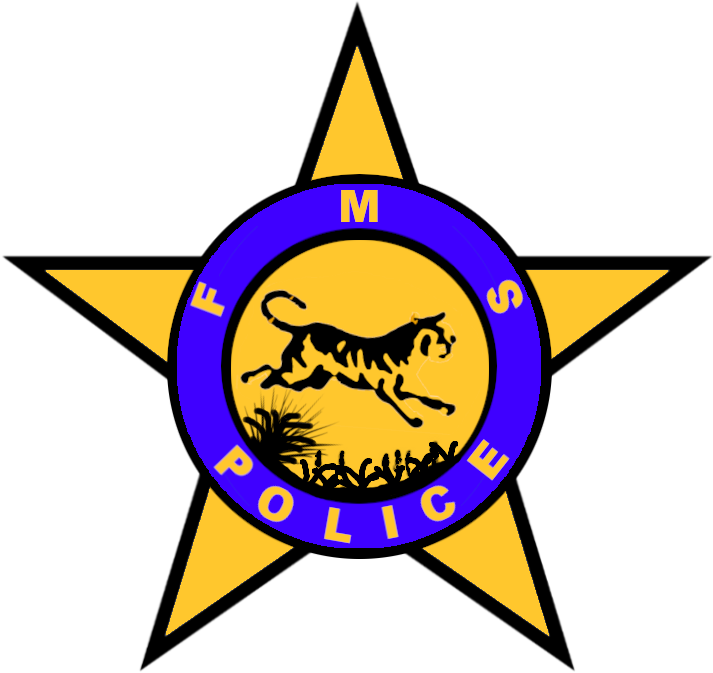

Agency overview
- Formed: 1 July 1896
- Dissolved: 1942
- Superseding agency: Kempeitai; Civil Affairs Police Force; Federation of Malaya Police

Jurisdictional structure
- Operations jurisdiction: Federated Malay States; Selangor; Perak; Negeri Sembilan; Pahang
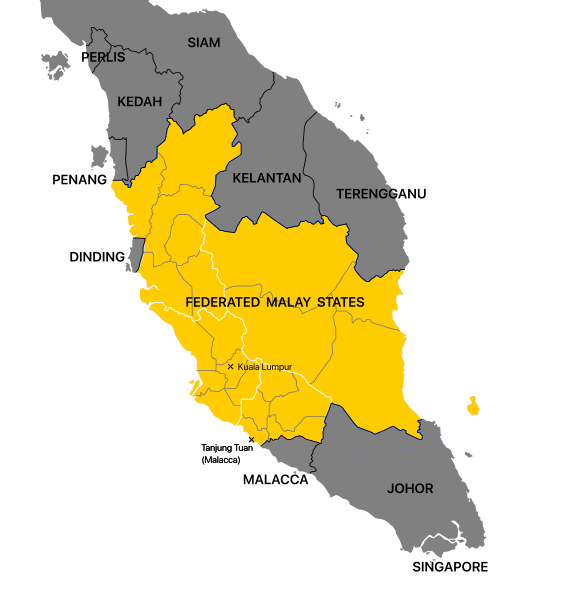

Operational structure
- Headquarters: Bluff Road Police Compound, Kuala Lumpur
- Administrators responsible: High Commissioners; Resident General; Chief Secretary
- Agency executives: Harry Charles Syers, 1st Police Commissioner; Edward Bagot, Last Inspector General of Police
- Parent agency: Colonial Police Service (1936–1942)
- Child agencies: Federated Malay States Railway Police; Perak Police Contingent; Negeri Sembilan Police Contingent; Pahang Police Contingent; Selangor Police Contingent

The Federated Malay States Police (FMSP) (Malay: Pasukan Polis Negeri-Negeri Melayu Bersekutu), also known as the Federated Malay States Police Force (FMSPF) or the FMS Police, was the paramilitary and armed police force of the Federated Malay States. It was formed in July 1896 from the merger of the independent police forces of Selangor, Perak, Negeri Sembilan, and Pahang into a unified police force. After nearly a half-century of existence, the FMS Police collapsed in 1942, during the height of the Pacific War and the Imperial Japanese occupation of these areas. After the war, the remainder of the FMS was absorbed into the Civil Affairs Police Force. In 1936, the FMS Police joined the Colonial Police Service. The FMS Police was only responsible for policing the Federated Malay States. Neighbouring states were either governed by the Straits Settlements Police Force, or by the independent police forces of the Unfederated Malay States.

== Composition ==
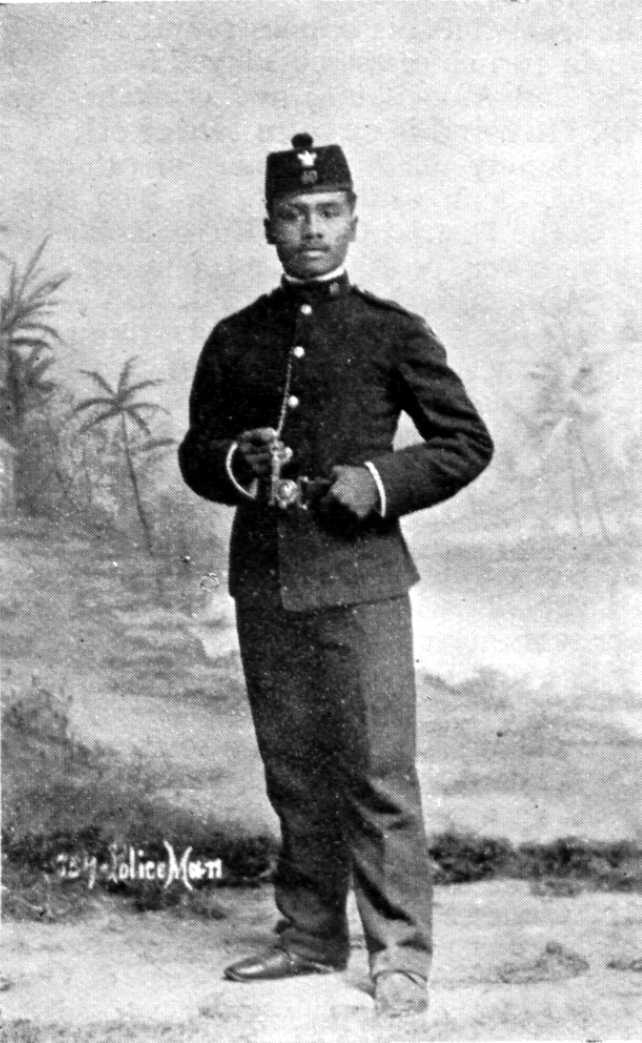
A policeman of the FMS Police. He is wearing the early standard blue uniform of the earlier era, before it was changed to khaki.

There were 2,000 members of the FMS Police in the year of 1896. By 1902, this had risen to 2,160.

Prior to 1903, most non-European officers were recruited in India. The establishment of the Police Training Depot allowed FMS Police to recruit from within the local population. Raja Iskandar, the Assistant Commissioner, made a great effort to attract local people to join the FMS Police.

Between 1911 and 1921, FMS Police went from a force of 2,138 members to 3,241.

Initially, the higher ranks of the FMS Police were mostly white Europeans, but by 1929, there were 9 Asian Assistant Commissioners in the force. The Federated States were only administered by the British, they were not themselves British colonies, and there was a high ratio of non-European officers in command roles. In 1929, the composition of the force included 2,195 Malays and 1,714 Northern Indians.

Recruitment quotas in 1929 mandated that the service recruit in India once every two months, and one Pathan or Punjabi Muslim was recruited for every three Sikhs. Ethnic Malays, however, were recruited as volunteers who walked in to recruitment offices.

== Organisation ==
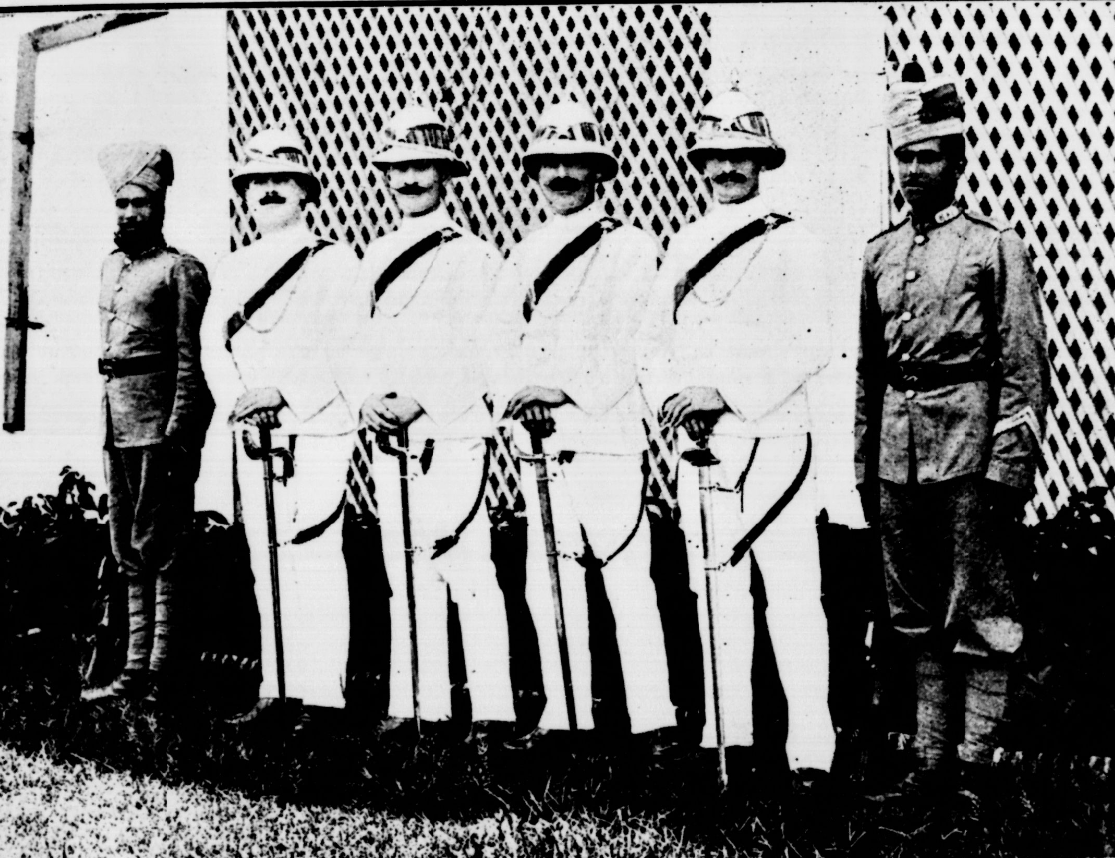
Two police constables stand to the left and right of four European Inspectors of the FMS Police. The inspectors are dressed in white. All four of the Inspectors here were reassigned to the FMS from the Royal Irish Constabulary.

The process to create the Federated Malay States (FMS) took place between 1892 and 1895, coming into effect with a charter on 1 July 1896. The formation of the FMS Police was simultaneous with the creation of the new federation. The Constitution of the Federated Malay States placed the FMS Police under the jurisdiction of the FMS central government, at the new federation capital city of Kuala Lumpur.

Gazetted Officers and Superior Officers were appointed on probationary periods, officially referred to as "Probationers." To become confirmed officers of the law, they needed to pass exams in languages, law, drill and ceremonies, musketry and firearms handling, police duties and regulations.

The first Police Commissioner for the FMS Police was Harry Syers (also spelled Sayers), the founder and Superintendent of Police at Selangor. Syers transformed the former Selangor Police headquarters at Bluff Road Police Compound into the new headquarters for FMS Police. At Bluff Road was also the Adjutant and the Director of Criminal Intelligence.

Between 1896 and 1903, the office of the Police Commissioner, while being assigned the charge of policing the state, was superseded by the Residents of the states and the High Commissioners. In those years, the commissioner's power's were limited to inspection duties. In 1903, Commissioner Henry Lynch Talbot consolidated and centralized the authority of police management under his office with the introduction of the Police Force Enactment 1903.

On 9 January 1924, the Police Force Enactment 1924 more explicitly enumerated the powers and responsibilities of the administration of the FMS Police.

In 1936, FMS Police joined the Colonial Police Service.

=== Police Contingents ===
==== State Police Contingents ====
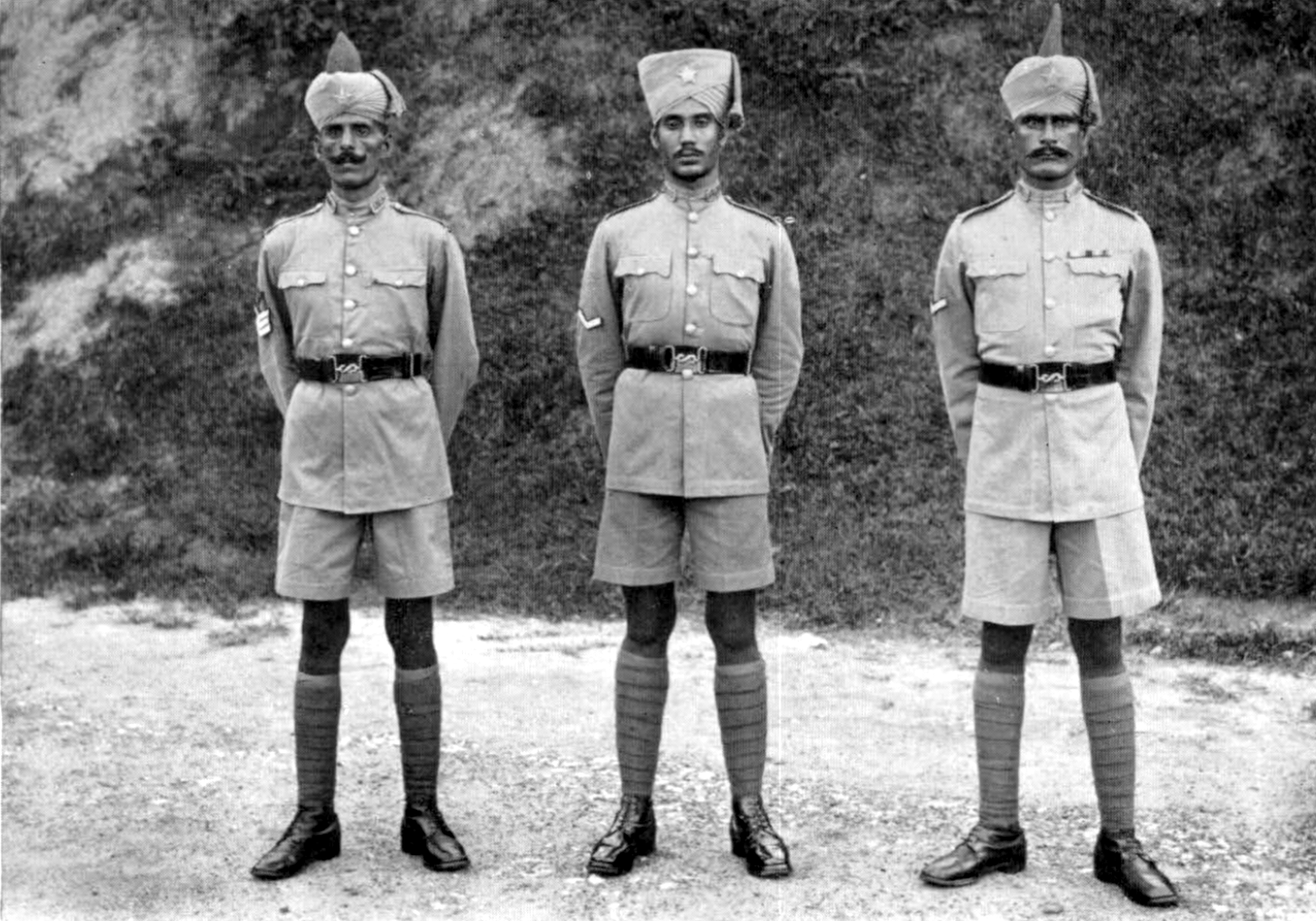
From left to right; a Pathan, a Sikh, and a Punjabi Muslim, all members of the Federated Malay States Police Force.

The formerly independent police forces of Perak, Pahang, Selangor and Negeri Sembilan acted as the State Police Contingents of FMS Police, and each contingent was placed under the command of an FMS Police Deputy Commissioner who simultaneously held the office of Chief Police Officer (CPO) for their contingent. Another independent police force had existed in Sungei Ujong, but this area was merged into the state of Negeri Sembilan during the year 1891, years prior to the creation of the FMS Police. With Syers' promotion to Police Commissioner, his position as Superintendent of Selangor was absorbed by Christian Wagner, who subsequently became the first CPO of Selangor. The first CPO of Pahang was Robert William Duff. Negeri Sembilan was led by F. W. Talbot.

For several months, FMS Police was assigned some military duties, but these were transferred to the Malay States Guides when that unit was established in Perak under the leadership of Colonel Robert Sandilands Frowd Walker. After Perak's reorganization in 1897, William Willes Douglas was made CPO of Perak.

Under the Chief Police Officer at each contingent headquarters were at least one Assistant Commissioner and a Chief Inspector. In Perak and Selangor, there was also a Court Chief Inspector.

In 1929, each State Contingent was subdivided into Police Circles, each under the authority of an Assistant Commissioner. Each Police Circle was further divided into Police Districts, each managed by a Police Inspector, serving as the Officer in Charge of the Police District (OCPD). Police stations were under the authority of a Sergeant, Corporal, or Lance-Corporal. The OCPD was responsible for conducting most of their own prosecutions in the local Magistrate's Court, but would refer serious cases to the Deputy Public Prosecutor.

==== Police Training Depot ====
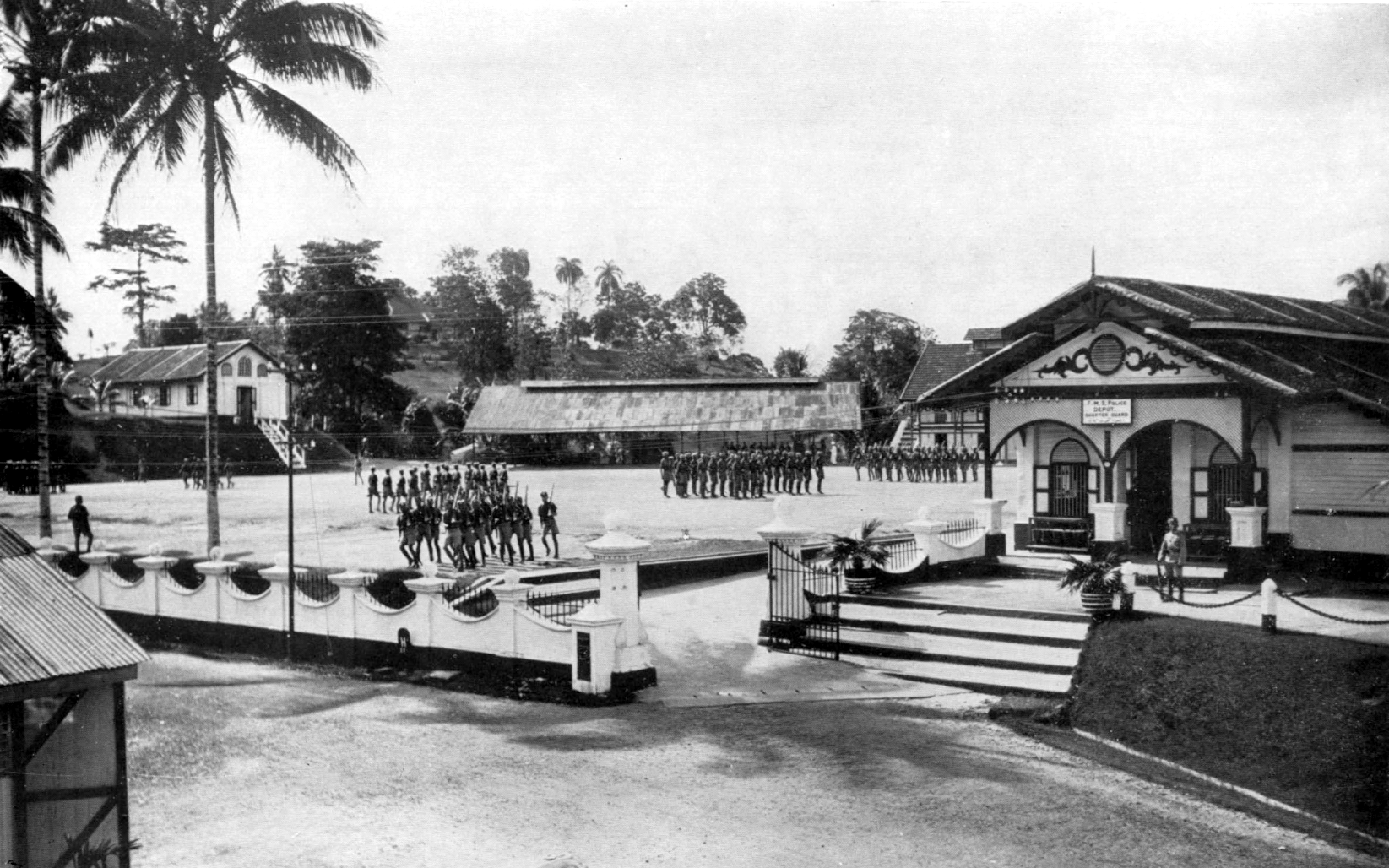
Recruits under instruction on the parade ground at the Police Training Depot in Kuala Lumpur, seen here around 1929. The Depot was considered the fifth FMS Police Contingent.

In October 1903, FMS Police established its first police academy, called the Police Training Depot, at the Bluff Road Police Compound. The Depot (or Depôt), became the fifth Police Contingent, complete with its own Deputy Commissioner who acted as Schoolmaster, and cadre staff. Recruit training lasted for one full year. At the end of that year, new officers were assigned to their Contingent Headquarters, then drafted to a Police District Headquarters, and finally assigned to the staff of a local police station if they were needed there.

In 1905, Captain McD Graham was appointed Adjutant of the Police Training Depot, formerly having served a decade in Perak with the Perak Sikhs and the Malay States Guides. Graham, seeing that local Malays were still reluctant to join the force. As such, he suggested to Commissioner Tabot and Frank Swettenham that a member of the Malayan royal family be made an officer of the FMS Police.

On 1 August 1905, Rajah Iskandar of Perak, with the ascent and approval of his father Sultan Idris, was appointed Assistant Commissioner of FMS Police. Iskandar was assigned to the Depot as chief recruiter for FMS Police. He travelled across the country, enlisting men into the service, and giving lectures to villages and their headmen on the nature of the new service. He also actively served as a trainer and a member of the cadre, where he was active in sports and physical education.

Periodical refresher courses were required for currently serving officers which lasted for a duration of three months.

In 1940, the police academy was moved to its new location at Rifle Range Road Police Depot, now called PULAPOL.

=== Bureaus and branches ===
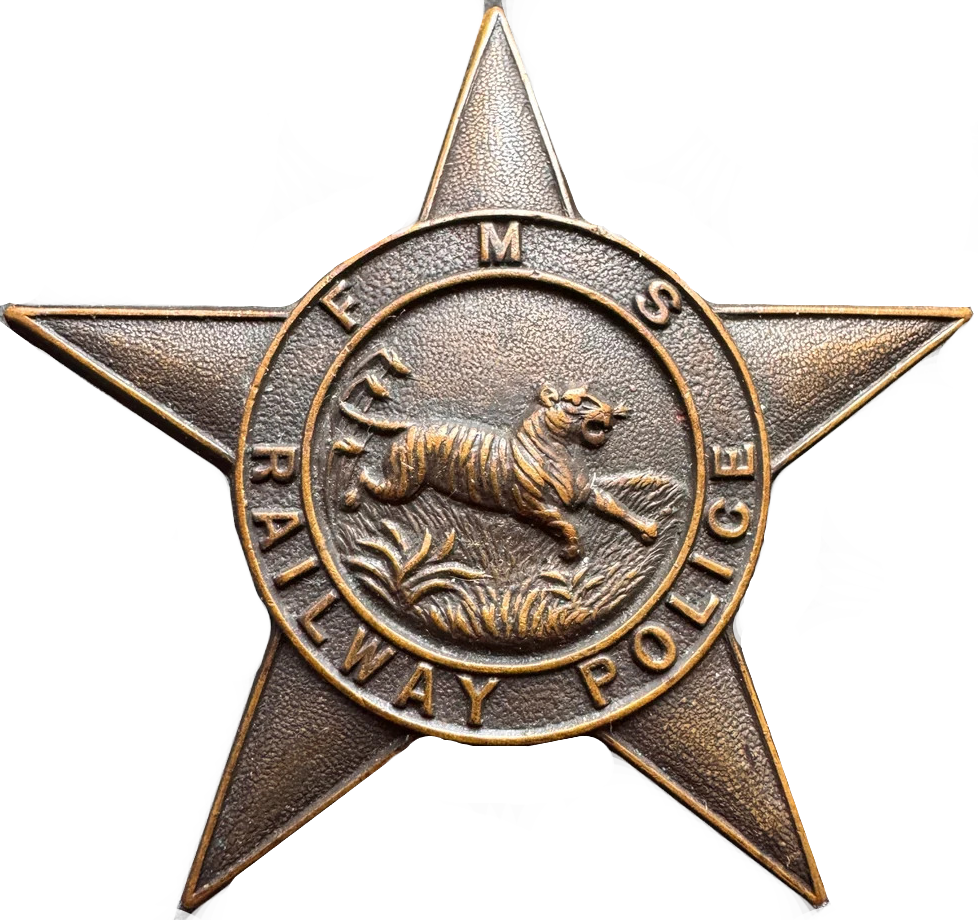
The Federated Malay States Railway Police (FMSRP) were a branch of the FMS Police assigned to the jurisdiction of the Federated Malay States Railways.

The Adjutant at Federal Police Headquarters, working under the Commissioner, also acted as the Registrar of Criminals, responsible for the Finger-print Bureau. The Finger-print Bureau also held records for the Straits Settlements Police Force and the police forces of the Unfederated Malay States.

The Detective Branch was maintained within each contingent assigned locally to an Assistant Commissioner. The Assistant Commissioner for Detectives worked under the Chief Police Officer, but also received orders from the Director of Criminal Intelligence, who worked at the Bluff Road Compound.

In the earlier years, the Fire Brigades were also overseen by FMS Police, until they became their own independent organisations.

By the year 1913, FMS Police was also responsible for the following bureaus and branches;

- FMS Railway Police
- FMS Veterinary Police
- Police Training Depot
- Suppression of Gambling
- Protection of Women and Girls
- Explosives enforcement
- Arms Registration
- Body Guards
  - Sultan of Perak Body Guard

== Weapons and equipment ==
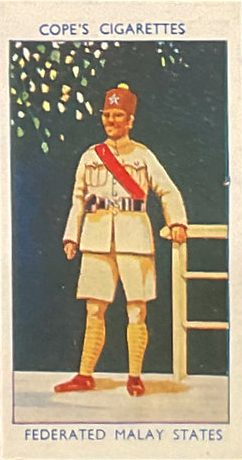
The khaki uniform of the FMS Police, designed by Iskandar of Perak.

In 1902, Selangor and Pahang issued their officers Martini–Enfield "converted" carbines. The other states were issued Martini–Henry rifles and carbines.

In 1896, the standardized blue uniform was introduced by Harry Syers. Each state of the federation was identifiable through their buttons and badges, with most commanders wearing the badge of the five pointed star and Malayan tiger.

When Iskandar of Perak was appointed Assistant Commissioner and chief recruiter at the Police Training Depot, he designed a new khaki uniform for the force, which was worn until 1941. This included a khaki tunic and shorts, khaki puttees, black boots, and the black pillbox cap.

== Ranks ==
Gazetted Staff Officers
| Commissioner | Adjutant | Deputy Commissioner (Chief Police Officer) | Assistant Commissioner |

Superior Officers
| Chief Inspector | Inspector | Native Officer | Sub-Inspector | Armourer |

Non-Commissioned Officers
| Sergeant Major | Sergeant | Armourer Sergeant | Corporal | Lance Corporal |

Constabulary
| Detective | Bugler | Constable | Armourer Apprentice | Cadet |

== Commissioners and Inspectors General ==
=== Commissioners of Police (1896–1935) ===
| No. | Image | Name | Term start | Term end | Ref. |
|---|---|---|---|---|---|
| 1 | | Harry Charles Syers | 1896 | 1897 | |
| 2 | | Henry Lynch Talbot | 1897 | 1909 # | |
| 3 | | William Willes Douglas | 1909 | 1913 | |
| – | | William Lance Conlay | 1914 | 1916 | |
| 4 | | William Lance Conlay | 1916 | 1924 | |
| - | | Charles Henry Sansom | 1924 | 1925 | |
| 5 | | Charles Hannigan | 1925 | 1931 | |
| 6 | | Charles Henry Sansom | 1931 | 1935 | |

=== Inspectors General of Police (1935–1942) ===
In 1935, the office of Commissioner of Police was reorganized to become the office of the Inspector General of Police.

| No. | Image | Name | Term start | Term end | Ref. |
|---|---|---|---|---|---|
| 1 | | Charles Henry Sansom | 1935 | 1939 | |
| 2 | | Edward Bagot | 1939 | 1941 | |

With the Japanese invasion of Malaya, Edward Bagot, the last-serving Inspector General of Police, fled to Singapore. However, at Singapore, he was captured by the Japanese during the Fall of Singapore. He was interned at Changi Prison. His wife managed to escape, and during the war lived at the Franklands Park Hotel in Haywards Heath. Bagot was at Changi Prison when his son, Alan Bagot, died in a German air raid while on leave from the military in Brighton.

=== Honorary Commissioners of Police ===
| Image | Name | Term start | Term end | Ref. |
|---|---|---|---|---|
| | Iskandar of Perak | 1 December 1918 | 14 August 1938 # | |
