= 1938 New Year Honours =

British royal recognitions

The 1938 New Year Honours were appointments by King George VI to various orders and honours to reward and highlight good works by citizens of the United Kingdom and British Empire. They were announced on 1 January 1938.

The recipients of honours are displayed here as they were styled before their new honour.

== United Kingdom and British Empire ==
=== Viscount ===
- William Richard, Baron Nuffield OBE DCL For public and philanthropic services.

=== Baron ===
- Field-Marshal Sir William Riddell Birdwood Bt GCB GCSI GCMG GCVO CIE DSO DCL Commander-in-Chief of the Army in India 1925–30. Master of Peterhouse, Cambridge. For public services.
- Sir (Henry) Leonard Campbell Brassey Member of Parliament for Northamptonshire, Northern division, 1910–18, and for the Peterborough division 1918–29. For political and public services in the Midlands.
- Sir (Francis) John Childs Ganzoni Bt DL MP Member of Parliament for Ipswich, 1914 to 1923 and since 1924. For political and public services.
- Sir Henry Yarde Buller Lopes Bt JP DL Chairman of Devon County Council. Deputy President of the University College of the South West of England, Exeter. For public services.
- Sir Percival Lea Dewhurst Perry KBE For political and public services.

=== Privy Counsellor ===
- The Right Honourable Sir John Anderson GCB GCSI GCIE lately Governor of Bengal.
- Robert Spear Hudson MP
- Brigadier-General George Charles, Earl of Lucan KBE CB TD

=== Baronet ===
- Sir Stephen Harry Aitchison JP For political and public services in Newcastle upon Tyne.
- Captain Derrick Wellesley Gunston MC MP For political and public services.
- John Auld MacTaggart JP For political and public services.
- Richard Alfred Pinsent Senior Member of the council, and Chairman of the Statutory Discipline Committee of The Law Society.
- Sir (Francis) Vernon Thomson KBE Chairman of the Tramp Shipping Subsidy Committee, and of the Tramp Shipping Administrative Committee.

=== Knight Bachelor ===
- Henry Alexander JP DL Chairman, Scottish Housing Advisory Committee.
- Charles Robert Bignold JP DL For political and public services in Norwich.
- James Edward Cecil Bigwood JP DL Chairman of the Joint Standing Committee of London Quarter Sessions. Chairman of the Finsbury Bench of Magistrates.
- Professor Geoffrey Arthur Romaine Callender FSA First Director of the National Maritime Museum. For services relating to the institution of the Museum.
- Colonel Philip Carlebach CMG TD Commandant of the City of London Cadet Brigade. For services to the Cadet movement.
- John Smedley Crooke JP MP For political and public services.
- Alderman David Davies JP For political and public services in St. Pancras.
- The Reverend Herbert Dunnico JP MP For political and public services.
- William Palin Elderton CBE FIA FFA Chairman of the British Insurance Association. Actuary and Manager of The Equitable Life Assurance Society.
- Charles Bruce-Gardner MIMechE Director of the Bankers' Industrial Development Company Limited.
- Alderman Ernest Hadfield OBE JP For political and public services in Southport, Lancashire.
- William Albert Jenkins, Member of Parliament for Brecon and Radnor, 1922–24. For political and public services.
- Professor Robert James Johnstone FRCS For services to public health in Northern Ireland.
- Sidney Law JP For political and public services in Stourbridge, Worcestershire.
- Joseph William Leech FRCSE JP MP For political and public services.
- Frederick Mander, General Secretary, National Union of Teachers.
- Henry Tindal Methold JP Master in Lunacy, Supreme Court of Judicature.
- Edward William Meyerstein, For benefactions to hospital and health services.
- James Wallace Peck CB FRSE Secretary, Scottish Education Department.
- Alexander Ramsay OBE Director of the Engineering and Allied National Employers' Federation.
- William Reavell MIMechE lately President of the British Engineers' Association. '
- Charles Robertshaw, For political and public services in the Sowerby division of Yorkshire.
- Robert Simon Rolo CBE For services to the British community in Egypt.
- William Henry Rowland JP For political and public services in Southampton.
- Admiral Percy Molyneux Rawson Royds CB CMG MP For political and public services in Surrey.
- William George Savage MRCS County Medical Officer of Health, Somerset.
- Percival Sharp Secretary, Association of Education Committees, England, Wales and Northern Ireland.
- William James Oliver Sheat OBE JP For political and public services in Ilford, Essex.
- Thomas Franklin Sibly Vice-Chancellor, Reading University.
- George Reeves-Smith, Chairman of the Coronation Accommodation Committee.
- Joshua Paterson Ross-Taylor, chairman, Highland and Agricultural Society. For services to Scottish Agriculture.
- Captain Ivor Broadbent Thomas JP DL For political and public services in South Wales.
- Charles McMoran Wilson MC FRCP Dean of St. Mary's Hospital Medical School.
- Duncan Randolph Wilson CVO CBE H.M. Chief Inspector of Factories, Home Office.
- Colonel William Fitzthomas Wyley JP DL For political and public services in Coventry and Warwickshire.

Dominions

Australia

- Alderman the Honourable Archibald Howie, Lord Mayor of the City of Sydney, State of New South Wales.
- George Dalziel Kelly a prominent grazier in the Commonwealth of Australia; for public services.
- Charles Francis Gerald McCann, Agent-General and Trade Commissioner in London for the State of South Australia.
- Charles Norman Paul For public and philanthropic services in the Commonwealth of Australia.
- Lieutenant-Colonel Charles Fernand Rey CMG lately Resident Commissioner, Bechuanaland Protectorate.

India

- Alfred Henry Lionel Leach, Chief Justice of the High Court of Judicature at Fort St. George, Madras.
- M.R. Ry. Rao Bahadur Arogyaswami Thamaraiselvam Pannirselvam Avargal, lately Member of the Executive Council of the Governor, and Minister, Madras.
- Cecil Patrick Blackwell MBE Puisne Judee of the High Court of Judicature at Bombay.
- John Coldstream, Indian Civil Service, lately Puisne Judge of the High Court of Judicature at Lahore, Punjab.
- Bisheshwar Nath Srivastava OBE Chief Judge, Chief Court of Oudh, United Provinces.
- Frederic Alexander Sachse CSI CIE Indian Civil Service, lately Member, Board of Revenue, Bengal.
- Zia-Uddin Ahmad CIE Vice-Chancellor, Aligarh Muslim University, United Provinces.
- Harold Nugent Colam AMICE Agent, Madras and Southern Mahratta Railway, Madras.
- Alexander Brebner CIE Imperial Service of Engineers, Chief Engineer, Central Public Works Department.
- Sayyid Aqeel Bilgrami, Nawab Aqeel Jung Bahadur, Member of Council in the Military, Medical and Allied Departments, His Exalted Highness the Nizam's Government, Hyderabad, Deccan.
- Maharaja Rao Jogendra Narayan Ray CIE of Lalgola (Murshidabad), Zamindar, District Murshidabad, Bengal.
- Sardar Nawab Naharsinhji Ishwarsinhji, Thakor of Amod, Bombay.
- Henry D'Arcy Cornelius Reilly, Indian Civil Service (Retired), Chief Justice in Mysore State.

Burma

- Arthur Eggar, Barrister-at-Law, Advocate-General, Burma.

Colonies, Protectorates, etc.

- Henry Isaac Close Brown, For public services in Jamaica.
- Bernard Arthur Crean, Colonial Legal Service, Chief Justice, British Guiana.
- Lambert Wilfred Alexander De Soysa, For public services in Ceylon.
- William Edgar Hunt CMG CBE Colonial Administrative Service, Chief Commissioner, Southern Provinces, Nigeria.
- Harry Herbert Trusted, Colonial Legal Service, Chief Justice, Palestine.

=== Order of the Bath ===
==== Knight Grand Cross of the Order of the Bath (GCB) ====
Military Division

- Admiral Sir Roger Roland Charles Backhouse GCVO KCB CMG
- General Sir Arthur Grenfell Wauchope GCMG KCB CIE DSO

Civil Division

- Sir Robert Gilbert Vansittart GCMG KCB MVO Permanent Under Secretary of State for Foreign Affairs.

==== Knight Commander of the Order of the Bath (KCB) ====
Military Division

- Engineer Vice-Admiral George Preece CB
- General John Standish Surtees Prendergast, Viscount Gort VC CB CBE DSO MVO MC Chief of the Imperial General Staff, The War Office.
- Lieutenant-General Arthur Edward McNamara CB CMG DSO
- Lieutenant-General Geoffrey Weston Howard CB CMG DSO

Civil Division

- Stanley Vernon Goodall CB OBE
- Honorary Colonel Francis Killigrew Seymour Metford CB OBE VD TD DL
- Sir Thomas James Barnes CBE H.M. Procurator General and Treasury Solicitor.
- Gilbert Francis Montriou Campion CB Clerk of the House of Commons.
- Sir (Richard Henry) Archibald Carter KCIE CB Permanent Secretary, Admiralty.
- Kenneth McKenzie Clark, Director of the National Gallery. Surveyor of the King's Pictures.
- Maurice Gerald Holmes CB OBE Permanent Secretary, Board of Education.
- Lucius Abel John Granville Ram CB First Parliamentary Counsel to the Treasury.

==== Companion of the Order of the Bath (CB) ====
Military Division

- Rear-Admiral Evelyn Claude Ogilvie Thomson DSO
- Rear-Admiral Lionel Victor Wells DSO
- Rear-Admiral Ralph Leatham
- Rear-Admiral Stephen St. Leger Moore CVO
- Rear-Admiral Wilfred Neville Custance
- Engineer Rear-Admiral Laurence Turner
- Major-General William Porter MacArthur DSO OBE FRCP FRCPI
- Major-General Alexander Elliott Davidson DSO MIMechE
- Major-General George James Giffard DSO
- Major-General Edward Archibald Beck DSO
- Major-General Robert Harold Carrington DSO
- Major-General Charles Noel Frank Broad DSO
- Major-General Sir Frederick Alfred Pile Bt DSO MC
- Major-General Lionel Vivian Bond
- Colonel Alexander Patrick Drummond Telfer-Smollett DSO MC
- Colonel Alfred Henry Hopwood DSO
- Major-General Thomas Arthur Atkinson Wilson
- Colonel Edward George Hall CIE
- Colonel Geoffrey Noel Ford DSO
- Colonel Gerald Charles Balfour Buckland DSO MC
- Colonel Albert Cecil Fewtrell DSO VD
- Air Marshal William Gore Sutherland Mitchell CB CBE MC AFC RAF
- Air Vice-Marshal John Eustace Arthur Baldwin DSO OBE RAF

Civil Division

- Brevet Colonel Bruce Atta Campbell TD DL Commanding 8th (The Argyllshire) Battalion, The Argyll and Sutherland Highlanders (Princess Louise's), and chairman, Territorial Army Association of the County of Argyll.
- Brigadier-General Sir Edward Thomas Le Marchant Bt CBE DL Chairman, Territorial Army and Air Force Association of the County of Nottingham.
- Thomas Herbert Boyd, Assistant Director General, General Post Office.
- Alexander Cunnison JP Principal Assistant Secretary, and Deputy Secretary, Ministry of Pensions
- William Scott Douglas, Secretary, Department of Health for Scotland.
- Kenneth Lyon CBE Assistant Under Secretary of State and Director of Finance, War Office.
- William Palmer, Second Secretary, Board of Trade.
- Albert Robinson, Controller of Death Duties, Board of Inland Revenue.
- Albert Henry Self, Second Deputy Secretary, Air Ministry.
- Frank Newton Tribe CBE Secretary, Department of the Commissioner for Special Areas (Development and Improvement), England and Wales

=== Order of the Star of India ===
==== Knight Commander of the Order of the Star of India (KCSI) ====
- His Highness Maharawat Ram Singh Bahadur, Maharawat of Pratapgarh, Rajputana

==== Companion of the Order of the Star of India (CSI) ====
- John Gilbert Laithwaite CIE
- Abraham Jeremy Raisman CIE
- Frederick Hale Puckle CIE
- John Anderson Thorne CIE
- Charles Alexander Henderson VD
- William Henry Nelson, Indian Civil Service, Commissioner, Bengal

=== Order of St Michael and St George ===
==== Knight Grand Cross of the Order of St Michael and St George (GCMG) ====
- The Right Honourable Earle Christmas Grafton Page

==== Knight Commander of the Order of St Michael and St George (KCMG) ====
- Sir Francis Lewis Castle Floud KCB British High Commissioner to Canada
- Sir Adrian Donald Wilde Pollock Kt
- Arthur Francis Grimble CMG
- Sir Wilfrid Thomas Southorn KBE CMG
- His Highness Sultan Salih Bin Ghalib Al Qu'aiti, Sultan of Shihr and Mukalla, Aden Protectorate.
- Herbert Hall Hall CMG one of His Majesty's Inspectors-General of Consular Establishments.
- Sir Edmund St. John Debonnaire John Monson Bt His Majesty's Envoy Extraordinary and Minister Plenipotentiary (Designate) to Sweden.

==== Companion of the Order of St Michael and St George (CMG) ====
- The Honourable James Edward Fenton. For public services in the Commonwealth of Australia.
- Theodore Grant Gray Director-General, Mental Hospitals Department, Dominion of New Zealand
- Major the Honourable Robert James Hudson MC
- Garnet Hercules Mackley, General Manager, Railways Department, Dominion of New Zealand.
- John Newman Morris FRACS
- George Ross Thomas, Under-Secretary of the Department of Public Instruction, and Director of Education, State of New South Wales.
- William Denis Battershill, Colonial Administrative Service, Chief Secretary, Palestine.
- Herbert Laurence Bayles, Colonial Administrative Service, Financial Secretary, Nigeria.
- Major Claude Henry Dale OBE Commissioner for His Majesty's Eastern African Dependencies Trade and Information Office.
- Kenneth Lambert Hall, Colonial Administrative Service, Chief Secretary, Nyasaland Protectorate.
- Philip Henry Manson-Bahr DSO FRCP Consulting Physician to the Colonial Office.
- Albert Rutherford Paterson, Colonial Medical Service, Director of Medical Services, Kenya.
- Reginald Edwin Robins OBE General Manager, Railways and Port Services, Tanganyika Territory.
- Charles Henry Sansom, Colonial Police Service, Commissioner of Police, Federated Malay States.
- Major Hubert Craddock Stevenson OBE MC Colonial Administrative Service, Chief Commissioner of Ashanti, Gold Coast.
- John Douglas Tothill Colonial Agricultural Service, Director of Agriculture, Uganda Protectorate.
- Lieutenant-Colonel Charles Edward Dunscomb Bridge DSO MC Secretary-General to the British Council.
- Paul Dalrymple Butler, His Majesty's Consul-General at Mukden.
- James Leishman Dodds, Acting Counsellor. at His Majesty's Embassy in Tokyo.
- Herbert Branes Ernley, General Manager of the Sudan Government Railways.
- Walter Everard Fuller OBE until recently Superintending Archivist at His Majesty's Embassy in Paris.
- Francis Hemming CBE Secretary to the International Committee for the Application of the Agreement regarding Nonintervention in Spain.
- Cecil Bertrand Jerram, Commercial Counsellor at His Majesty's Embassy in Spain; at present serving as Assistant to the Agent of His Majesty's Government in the United Kingdom to General Franco.
- Hugh Lloyd Thomas CVO Minister Plenipotentiary at His Majesty's Embassy in Paris.
- Everard Noel Rye Trentham, Financial Adviser to His Majesty's Embassy in Washington.

=== Order of the Indian Empire ===
==== Knight Commander of the Order of the Indian Empire (KCIE) ====
- Lieutenant-Colonel Harold Wilberforce-Bell CIE Indian Political Service, Resident for the Punjab States.
- William Hawthorne Lewis CSI CIE Indian Civil Service, Reforms Commissioner to the Government of India.
- Major-General Ernest Alexander Walker CB FRCSE Indian Medical Service, lately Director of Medical Services in India, Army Headquarters.
- Gilbert Wiles CSI CIE Indian Civil Service, chairman, Bombay Port Trust

==== Companion of the Order of the Indian Empire (CIE) ====
- Leonard George Pinnell, Indian Civil Service, Secretary to the Governor of Bengal.
- Bernard Henry Dobson CBE Indian Civil Service, Officiating Financial Commissioner, Punjab.
- Colonel Percy Strickland Mills MRCS DTM&H Indian Medical Service, Surgeon-General with the Government of Bengal.
- John Cotton Farmer, Indian Police, Inspector-General of Police, Bengal.
- Arthur Gordon Phillips, Indian Police, Officiating Inspector-General of Police, United Provinces.
- Arthur Jules Dash, Indian Civil Service, Commissioner, Bengal.
- Percy John Hodsell Stent, Indian Civil Service, Commissioner, Nagpur Division, Central Provinces and Berar.
- Arthur John Hopkinson, Indian Political Service, lately Chief Secretary to the Government of the North-West Frontier Province.
- Lieutenant-Colonel Gerald Thomas Fisher, Indian Political Service, Resident at Gwalior and Political Agent for the States of Rampur and Benares.
- Charles William Blyth Normand Director-General of Observatories, Government of India.
- Lieutenant-Colonel Frederic Allan Barker OBE Indian Medical Service, Inspector-General of Prisons, Punjab.
- Colonel Walter Edward Lionel Long, Indian Army, lately deputy director of Ordnance. Services Army Headquarters, India.
- Group Captain Malcolm Henderson DSO Royal Air Force, lately Officer Commanding, Aircraft Dept, Karachi.
- Cyril Francis Bell, Indian Forest Service, Chief Conservator of Forests, Central Provinces and Berar.
- Michael O'Brien AMICE Indian Service of Engineers, Chief Engineer, Public Works Department (General, Buildings and Roads), Madras.
- Alfred Vipan, Indian Service of Engineers, Chief Engineer and Secretary to the Government of Orissa.
- Alexander Gordon, Indian Service of Engineers, Chief Engineer and Secretary to Government in the Public Works Department; Sind.
- Lieutenant-Colonel Reginald Victor Martin MRCS LRCP DOMS Indian Medical Service, Officiating Inspector-General of Prisons, Bombay Presidency.
- Harry Greenfield, Imperial Customs Service, Collector of Salt Revenue, Madras.
- Maurice William Walter Murray Yeatts, Indian Civil Service, Deputy Secretary to the Government of India in the Department of Education, Health and Lands.
- Cecil Holroyd Gadsden, Indian Police, Deputy Inspector-General of Police, Madras.
- Lieutenant-Colonel Roger Cormell Fletcher, Indian Army, Commandant, 3rd Burma Rifles.
- Khan Bahadur Shapurji Nasarvanji Jamshedji Ratnagar, Indian Forest Service (Retired), lately Conservator of Forests, Southern Circle, Bombay.
- Lieutenant-Colonel Gerald Tyler Burke FRCP (Lond.), Indian Medical Service (Retired), lately Secretary, Medical Council of India.
- Major Cyril George Toogood DSO Indian Army, 2nd King Edward's Own Gurkha Rifles, Military Secretary to the Governor of Bombay.
- Leonard Owen, Indian Civil Service, Magistrate and Collector, Cawnpore, United Provinces.
- Arnold Whittaker, Indian Civil Service, Magistrate and Collector, Chittagong, Bengal.
- Major Humphrey Aston Barnes, Indian Political Service, Political Agent, South Waziristan.
- Henry Samuel Rogers Boyagian, Engineer-in-Charge, Meghna Bridge Construction, Assam-Bengal Railway, Bengal.
- Diwan Bahadur Pandit Dharam Narain, Musahib Ala, Udaipur (Mewar) State, Rajputana.
- Shaikh Abdulla al Salim al Subah, of Kuwait, Persian Gulf.

=== Royal Victorian Order ===
==== Dame Grand Cross of the Royal Victorian Order (GCVO) ====
- Helen Magdalen, Duchess of Northumberland CBE JP

==== Knight Grand Cross of the Royal Victorian Order (GCVO) ====
- Lieutenant-Colonel David Lyulph Gore Wolseley, Earl of Airlie KCVO MC JP DL
- Thomas Jeeves, Baron Horder KCVO FRCP

==== Dame Commander of the Royal Victorian Order (DCVO) ====
- Anne Annette Minna Cochrane

==== Knight Commander of the Royal Victorian Order (KCVO) ====
- Alfred Edwin Dunphie CVO
- John Berkeley Monck CMG CVO

==== Commander of the Royal Victorian Order (CVO) ====
- Edmund Blaikie Boyd CMG
- William Dawson Croft CIE
- The Reverend Prebendary John Henry Joshua Ellison MVO
- Sir Edward Francis Knapp-Fisher

==== Member of the Royal Victorian Order (MVO) ====
At this time the two lowest classes of the Royal Victorian Order were "Member (fourth class)" and "Member (fifth class)", both with post-nominals MVO. "Member (fourth class)" was renamed "Lieutenant" (LVO) from the 1985 New Year Honours onwards.

Military Division

==== Member of the Royal Victorian Order, 4th class (MVO) ====
- Commander Richard Francis John Onslow RN (dated 20 July 1937).
- Gavin Ralston, (dated 13 August 1937.)
- Captain Charles Wallis Carrington King
- Robert Ernest Tucker
- Sydney Arthur White

==== Member of the Royal Victorian Order, 5th class (MVO) ====
- William Thomas Folland
- Paymaster-Lieutenant Albert William Stone RN (retired)
- Captain George John William Townsend MBE

=== Order of the British Empire ===
==== Knight Grand Cross of the Order of the British Empire (GBE) ====
- Sir Andrew Rae Duncan For public services. Chairman of the Central Electricity Board, 1927–35.

==== Dame Commander of the Order of the British Empire (DBE) ====
- Florence Barraclough Barrie Lambert CBE JP For political and public services in London.
- Gwendoline Joyce Trubshaw CBE Chairman of the Carmarthenshire County Council.

==== Knight Commander of the Order of the British Empire (KBE) ====
Military Division

- Vice-Admiral Sidney Robert Bailey CB CBE DSO

Civil Division

- Charles Joseph Flynn Director, Food (Defence Plans) Department, Board of Trade.
- James Frederick George Price CB Deputy Secretary, Ministry of Labour.
- William David Ross OBE President of the British Academy. Provost of Oriel College, Oxford.
- Alexander Thomson Taylor OBE JP For political and public services in Renfrewshire and the West of Scotland.
- James Henderson CBE a British subject resident in Milan.
- Clive Latham Baillieu CMG OBE For public services to the Commonwealth of Australia.
- Theodore Rigg FIC Director of the Cawthron Institute, Nelson, Dominion of New Zealand.
- William Hannah McLean MInstCE For services to education and economic development in the Colonies.

Honorary Knight Commander

- His Highness Tuan Syed Alwi ibni almarhum Syed San CMG CBE Raja of Perlis, Malay States

==== Commander of the Order of the British Empire (CBE) ====
Military Division

- Rear-Admiral Patrick Macnamara (Retired)
- Surgeon Rear-Admiral Bryan Pickering Pick OBE MRCS LRCP KHS
- Colonel Searle Dwyer Mason ED Commander 3rd New Zealand Infantry Brigade, Southern Command, New Zealand Military Forces.
- Lieutenant-Colonel Francis Robinson DSO Regular Army Reserve of Officers, The York and Lancaster Regiment, Officer Commanding Aden Protectorate Levies.
- Group Captain Frank Hubert McNamara VC RAAF

Civil Division

- John Baldwyn Beresford MBE Secretary, University Grants Committee. Secretary, Standing Commission on Museums and Galleries.
- James Percy Chatterton Coast, lately Secretary of the Land Agents' Society.
- Harriet Pearl Alice Cohen FRAM For services to music, and the promotion of interest in British music abroad.
- Gertrude Mary Dean JP For political and public services in Blackburn.
- Clara Fyfe MBE Chairman of the Central Council of the National Union of Conservative and Unionist Associations, 1937–38. For political and public services.
- Walter Henry Gaunt OBE Member of the Transport Advisory Council.
- George Kruger Gray Designer of coins, seals and medals.
- Herbert John Gordon Griffin, Secretary, Council for the Preservation of Rural England.
- Arthur Lonsdale Hetherington, Assistant Secretary, Department of Scientific and Industrial Research.
- Mary Katherine Howard Price-Hughes, Head of the West London Mission Sisterhood.
- Alderman William Hyde JP lately Chairman of the National Health Insurance Consultative Council.
- Lieutenant-Colonel Frederick Hawke Kempe MC Regional Director, London Postal Region, General Post Office.
- John Alexander King, lately Assessor of Public Undertakings (Scotland).
- Tennyson John David Large OBE Higher Collector, Liverpool, Board of Customs and Excise.
- James Mahood ISO Assistant Paymaster General.
- Lieutenant-Colonel Stuart Sidney Mallinson DSO MC Chairman of the Leyton and Walthamstow Local Employment Committee.
- Joseph William Mellor FRS lately Director of the British Refractories Research Association. An authority on ceramics.
- Cecil Charles Hudson Moriarty OBE Chief Constable of Birmingham.
- Matthew White, Viscount Ridley, Chairman of the North East Development Board. For public services in Durham and Tyneside.
- Alderman Philip Foale Rowsell JP Honorary Treasurer, and a past President, of the National Association of Insurance Committees. Three times Mayor of Exeter.
- Grace Selinger (Miss Gracie Fields), actress.
- William John Sherwood JP lately National Organiser of the National Union of General and Municipal Workers.
- Ernest Charles Snow Joint Honorary Secretary of the Royal Statistical Society.
- Thomas Peter Miller Somers MICE City Engineer and Master of Works, Glasgow.
- Robert Sproul Stewart JP For political and public services in Glasgow.
- Alexander Hamilton Thompson FBA FSA Professor of History at Leeds University. Member of the Royal Commission on Historical Monuments (England).
- Lieutenant-Colonel James Walker DSO OBE TD JP For political and public services in Kingston-upon-Hull.
- Robert Bryce Walker, County Clerk of Lanarkshire.
- Alderman William Edwin Wardill JP Member of the Gateshead Town Council. For services to Gateshead, especially his connection with children.
- Walter Sutherland Wilkinson, Chief Inspector of Audit, Ministry of Health.
- Husein Hasanally Abdoolcader, For public services in the Straits Settlements.
- The Right Reverend David Williams Bentley Bishop of Barbados. For services to education in Barbados.
- Chau Tsun-Nin, For public services in Hong Kong.
- John Robert Dewar, Colonial Survey Service, Surveyor-General, Federated Malay States and Straits Settlements.
- Frank Dudley Evans MInstCE Director of Public Works, Nigeria.
- Seiyid Bubekr Al Kaf. For public services in the Aden Protectorate.
- Herbert Charles Ransom OBE Head of the Finance Department, Crown Agents for the Colonies.
- William Humphrey Smith, Colonial Audit Department, Auditor, Kenya.
- Ronald Garland Jayne OBE President of the British Chamber of Commerce, Lisbon.
- William Alexander McCallum, Chairman of the British Chamber of Commerce, Buenos Aires.
- Douglas Newbold OBE Governor of the Kordofan Province, Sudan.
- William John Sullivan, His Majesty's Consul at Valencia.
- The Hon. Joseph Darling MLC a prominent pastoralist in the State of Tasmania; for public services.
- John Shields Duncan Deputy-Director in New South Wales, Postmaster General's Department, Commonwealth of Australia.
- Reginald Ernest Goodman, Auditor, Basutoland, the Bechuanaland Protectorate and Swaziland.
- Arthur Claude Moore, Assistant Comptroller-General (Tariff), Department of Trade and Customs, Commonwealth of Australia.
- Elgin Nathaniel George Poulton, Private Secretary to the Minister for Internal Affairs, Dominion of New Zealand.
- Archibald Aloysius Rankin, For social welfare and municipal services in the City of Newcastle, State of New South Wales.
- Lady Winifred Russell. For social welfare services in Southern Rhodesia.
- Sardar Buta Singh, Member, Council of State.
- Sardar Shrinivas Cupuswani Mudliar, First Class Sardar of the Deccan, Bombay.
- Arthur Edward Jefferys Nicolls, lately chairman, United Planters' Association of Southern India, Madras.

Honorary Knight Commander

- Ibrahim Pasha Hashem, Chief Minister and Minister of Justice, Trans-Jordan.

==== Officer of the Order of the British Empire (OBE) ====
Military Division

- Instructor Captain Geoffrey Archibald Clarkson
- Commander Laurence Bernard Hill RN
- Commander Charles Bourdas Tinley RN
- Paymaster-Commander Evelyn Norman Robert Fletcher MBE RN
- Lieutenant-Commander Wallace St. John Ainslie RN
- Captain George Underbill DSC RM (Retired).
- Commander Alexander John Loudoun-Shand
- The Reverend Alexander Tulloh
- Lieutenant-Commander Martin Henry St. Leger Nott RIN
- Major Maurice Alfred Johnson MM late Commanding, Engineer Corps, Hong Kong Volunteer Defence Corps.
- Captain (local Major) Frederick Kennedy, Staff Quarter-Master, Southern Brigade, The King's African Rifles.
- Lieutenant-Colonel Patrick John McCormack DSO VD Officer Commanding 52nd Battalion, 3rd Division, Australian Military Forces.
- Lieutenant (local Captain) Edward Blyde Millwood, Lieutenant (Quarter-Master) Territorial Army Reserve of Officers, Quarter-Master, The Nigeria Regiment, Royal West African Frontier Force.

Civil Division

- Bernard Oglie Anson MIEE Assistant Engineer-in-Chief, General Post Office.
- Maurice Edward Antrobus, Political Secretary, Office of the High Commissioner in the Union of South Africa for His Majesty's Government in the United Kingdom.
- Georgina Birdsworth Ayre JP Member of the Colne Education Committee.
- George Stewart Bailey, Chief Staff Officer, Board of Trade.
- Arthur Brooksbank Ball, Secretary of the Silk Association.
- Captain Ernest William Barltrop DSO Deputy Divisional Controller, Wales, Ministry of Labour.
- Florence Emma Bell. For political and public services in Lincoln.
- Councillor William Henry Bickham. For political arid public services in Swindon, Wiltshire.
- William George Tabor Blois MBE General Secretary of the National Federation of Meat Traders Associations.
- Leslie Ripley Bradley MBE Curator and Secretary, Imperial War Museum.
- William Bradley MBE Senior Costings Investigator, War Office.
- George William Brake, Divisional Inspector, Ministry of Health.
- Christopher Bristow ARIBA Architect, H.M. Office of Works and Public Buildings.
- Alderman Alfred Brooks JP Alderman of the Essex County Council.
- Ada Elizabeth Cecil Chesterton, Founder of the Cecil Public Lodging Houses for homeless women.
- David Cannon Christie DCM Chief Constable of Angus.
- Anne Elizabeth, Lady Clarke. For political and public services in Leeds.
- Hettie Rowntree Clifford, Superintendent of the Women's Work of the West Ham Central Mission.
- Phyllis Constance Colson, Organising Secretary, Central Council of Recreative Physical Training.
- John Edwin Dalton, H.M. Staff Inspector of Schools, Board of Education.
- Daisy Florence Daw JP For political and public services in South Dorset.
- Albert William Dunton MC Chief Executive Officer, India Office.
- Francis Carolus Eeles, General Secretary of the Central Council for the Care of Churches.
- Edward Percy Everest MBE Superintendent Registrar of the Shrewsbury Registration District. Clerk of the Atcham Rural District Council.
- Admiral Cresswell John Eyres DSO (Retired), Member of the Special Grants Committee, Ministry of Pensions. Member of the Surrey County Council.
- Hubert William Warwick Fisher MBE Assistant Secretary, Ministry of Transport.
- Joseph Foreman, For political and public services in Montrose.
- Robert Knox Leslie Galloway, Honorary Treasurer of the Ulster Industries Development Association.
- Nicholas William Gaudion, lately H.M. Procureur in Alderney.
- John Goldie, Chief Constable, Metropolitan Police.
- Eva Conway Everard Gooch MBE Chairman, General Council of the Scottish Women's Rural Institute.
- Janet Vera Good MRCS LRCP Senior Woman Medical Officer, General Post-Office.
- Florence Lewis Haslett, Assistant Private Secretary to the Governor of Northern Ireland.
- Alfred Henry Havelock, H.M. Senior Inspector of Taxes, Board of Inland Revenue.
- Arthur Sidney Hines MBE Senior Staff Clerk, Unemployment Assistance Board.
- Alderman John Basil Hope JP For political and public services in Bedford.
- James Edward Houseman JP For political and public services in Shoreditch.
- Captain John Glynn-Jones MC Honorary Secretary, South Wales Federation of Boys' Clubs.
- Rose Margaret Mark Kerr, International Commissioner and Deputy Chief Commissioner for the Home Counties in the Girl Guides Association.
- Horace Kimber, Chief Inquiry Officer, Board of Customs and Excise.
- Reginald Sydney Gilbert Knight FIC Manager and Deputy Superintendent, Royal Naval Cordite Factory, Holton Heath.
- John Lament, For political and public services in Edinburgh.
- Frank Leney, lately Curator, Norwich Castle Museum and Art Gallery.
- Louise Henrietta Luard MBE JP For public services in Hereford.
- George Leslie Marshall, Northern Ireland Regional Director, British Broadcasting Corporation.
- Hugh Marwick Director of Education for Orkney.
- Alderman William Francis Middleton JP For political and public services in Edmonton.
- Robert Jones Morris JP For political and public services in Merionethshire.
- John Jamieson Munro, Chairman of the Stirling Local Employment Committee.
- Henry Edgar Norman, Secretary, National Association of Probation Officers.
- Richard Ogle, lately Chief Constable of Gateshead.
- Roden Horace Powlett Orde, Secretary, British Hospitals Association.
- Captain Leonard Edward Owen JP For political and public services in Gravesend.
- Avice Margaret, Alderman Mrs. Pimblett JP For political and public services in Preston, Lancashire.
- Adam Henry Robson MC Principal Education Officer, Air Ministry.
- Edward William Roe MBE Commandant, Metropolitan Special Constabulary.
- Marian Cross Ross. For political and public services in Glasgow.
- Herbert Somerville Smith DSO MC Assistant Manager, Export Credits Guarantee Department.
- Henry Arthur van de Linde FCA Honorary Secretary of the Gordon Memorial College Executive Committee.
- David Warnock, Senior Assistant Chief Constable, Glasgow City Police.
- Frederick Arthur Webber JP For political and public services in Bristol.
- Victor Ernest Wilkins MBE Principal, Ministry of Agriculture and Fisheries.
- John Williams JP For public services; in Glamorgan.
- Colonel Lawrence Williams DL Chairman of the Anglesey County Council.
- Malcolm Burnett Gardiner Austin, For public services in British Guiana.
- Aw Boon Haw, For philanthropic services in the Straits Settlements.
- Frank Leslie Brown MC Colonial Administrative Service, Assistant Colonial Secretary, Jamaica.
- Commander John Oswald Buckler RD RNR Senior Marine Officer, Kenya and Uganda Railways and Harbours Administration.
- Frederick Raymond Charlton, Colonial Survey Service, Commissioner of Lands, Crown Surveyor, and chairman, Mining Board, Fiji.
- Arnold Kirtland Cole, Collector of Customs, Bahamas.
- Arthur Harold Dickinson, Colonial Police Service, Chief Police Officer, Selangor, Federated Malay States.
- The Very Reverend Father John Joseph English For services to edu.cation in Trinidad.
- Robert Alexander Farquharson, Geologist in Charge, Water-Boring Scheme, Somaliland Protectorate.
- Alexander Stewart Folkes, For public services in Uganda Protectorate.
- The Reverend Canon Robert Mortimer Gibbons. For services to education in the Tanganyika Territory.
- Louis Despilly Antoine Jorre de St. Jorre, Treasurer and Collector of Customs, Seychelles.
- Hugh Morley Oliff Lester MRCS LRCP Colonial Medical Service, deputy director, Sleeping Sickness Service, Nigeria.
- James Douglas McKean, Colonial Administrative Service, District Officer, Kenya.
- Nicolas Ioannou Nicolaides, For public services in Cyprus.
- Stead Pope, Colonial Postal Service, Postmaster General, Gold Coast.
- Owen Gordon Price AMIStructE Assistant Director of Public Works, Sierra Leone.
- Harry Rich, For public services in Northern Rhodesia.
- Hilda Ridler, Principal, Women's Training College, and Inspector of Girls' Schools, Palestine.
- William Henry Smith, For public services in Gibraltar.
- Khimji Katau Sually MBE For public services in Zanzibar.
- Henry Harrison Vaskess, Secretary to the High Commission, Western Pacific.
- William Llewellyn Wall, For public services in the Leeward Islands.
- James Watson, Chief Inspector of English Schools, Straits Settlements and Federated Malay States.
- The Reverend William Paulin Young MC DCM For public services in the Nyasaland Protectorate.

Diplomatic Service and Overseas List

- Albert Spencer Calvert, until recently His Majesty's Consul at Jedda.
- Hatherley Moor Dobree, until recently Chief Engineer to the Port of Basra Directorate.
- Harald de Courcy Harston, until recently His Majesty's Consul at Berne.
- Kenneth Henry Joly, a British subject resident in Beirut.
- Thomas Watson MacCallum, a British subject resident in Vienna.
- Frank Frederick Maeers, a British subject, until recently resident in Cairo.
- Major Charles Reginald Redgrave, a British subject resident in New York.
- Charles Edward Joseph Walkley MBE until recently Deputy Assistant Civil Secretary, Sudan Government.

Burma

- U Tin Gyi, A.T.M., Burma Civil Service (Class I), Registrar, Co-operative Credit Societies, Burma.

British India

- Louie Brooks, Honorary Secretary, United Kingdom Branch, Lady Dufferin Fund Association.
- Khan Bahadur Ahmad Bakhsh ISO Superintendent, Prince of Wales' Hospital, Bhopal, Central India.
- Rai Bahadur Lala Amar Nath MBE Lahore, Punjab.
- Percy Edgar Barker, Deputy Financial Adviser, Military Accounts Department.
- Captain Thomas William Barnard FRPS FRSA Director, Barnard Institute of Radiology, Madras.
- Oscar Henry Brown, Presidency Magistrate, 2nd Court, Mazagaon, Bombay.
- Rai Bahadur Chuni Laj, lately Financial Secretary to the Government of the North-West Frontier Province.
- Thomas Robertson Clark, Manager, Salona Tea Estate, Nowgong, Assam.
- David Wemyss Crighton, Superintendent, Printing and Stationery, United Provinces.
- George Olpherts Forrester, Honorary Magistrate, ist Class, Central Provinces and Berar.
- Major Cecil Walter Lewery Harvey MC Indian Political Service, Secretary to the Resident for the States of Western India.
- Major Dinshaw Sorabji Khory MBE of Messrs. Mackinnon, Mackenzie & Co., Ltd., Sind.
- Hardit Singh Malik, Indian Civil Service, lately Deputy Secretary to the Government of India in the Commerce Department.
- Rai Bahadur Nalini Nath Mazumdar, Indian Police, Special Superintendent, Intelligence Branch, Bengal.
- Sydney Ernest Platt, MIM and Cy.E., Superintending Engineer, Public Health Circle, Bihar.
- Ram Chandra Srivastava, Director, Imperial Institute of Sugar Technology, Cawnpore, United Provinces.
- Charles Adolphus Tuckwell, Superintendent of Telegraph Workshops, Alipore, Calcutta.
- Gerald Sebastian White, Registrar, High Court of Judicature at Fort St. George, Madras.

Colonies, Protectorates, etc.

- Bernard Winthrop Swithinbank, Indian Civil Service, Burma Civil Service (Class I), Commissioner, Pegu Division, Burma.

Dominions

- Major James Edward Barrett, Deputy Commissioner in New South Wales, Repatriation Commission, Commonwealth of Australia.
- The Right Reverend Monseigneur Joseph-Cyprien Bonhomme Vicar Apostolic of the Roman Catholic Church in Basutoland.
- Commander Philip Duke Crofton RN (Retired), Controller, London House (Hostel for Dominion Students).
- William Alfred Devine, chairman, Public Services Board, Southern Rhodesia.
- David McKenzie Dow, Official Secretary for the Commonwealth of Australia in the United States of America.
- Peter Douglas Hay Dunn, chairman of the Board of Customs, Newfoundland.
- Edward Pohau Ellison Chief Medical Officer, and Deputy Resident Commissioner, Cook Islands, Dominion of New Zealand.
- David John Evans JP Clerk, Westland County Council, Dominion of New Zealand.
- John Charles Fulton Medical Superintendent, Launceston Public Hospital, State of Tasmania.
- John Klunder Jensen, Secretary, Munitions Supply Board, Department of Defence, Commonwealth of Australia.
- John Johnston, For municipal services in the City of Hay, State of New South Wales.
- Mary Isabel Lambie, Director, Division of Nursing, Health Department, Dominion of New Zealand.
- George McCloghrie, Constructor, Royal Corps of Naval Constructors, Manager of the Naval Base at Devonport, Auckland, Dominion of New Zealand.
- John Samuel Neville, Town Clerk, Christchurch, Dominion of New Zealand.
- Ernest Charles Pulbrook, formerly a Member of the Board of the Land and Agricultural Bank, Southern Rhodesia.
- Irene Read. For charitable services in the State of New South Wales.
- William Bolton Rimmer Acting Director of the Solar Observatory at Mount Stromlo, Commonwealth of Australia.
- The Reverend Peter McGregor Shepherd Representative of the United Free Church of Scotland Mission in the Bechuanaland Protectorate.
- Samuel Marshall Symons, Controller of Customs and Excise, Southern Rhodesia.
- Leslie Thomas Williams, For services to ex-servicemen and their dependents in the Commonwealth of Australia.

Honorary Officers

- Abdullah Kardus MBE Administrative Officer, Palestine.
- Itta David Yellin. For public services in Palestine.

==== Member of the Order of the British Empire (MBE) ====
Military Division

- Lieutenant Frederick William Mitchell RN MBE
- Wardmaster Lieutenant Bertie Tames Hoare
- RN Commissioned Engineer Leonard Victor Hauser DSM RN
- Commissioned Bandmaster Lewis Platford Donne
- R.M. Gunner Francis Charles Tibbs RN
- Paymaster-Lieutenant Herbert William Shepherd
- Commissioned Boatswain Joseph Walton Williams
- Lieutenant Rahmat bin Abbas, 2nd Battalion, Straits Settlements Volunteer Force.
- Quarter-Master and Honorary Captain Ernest William Latchford MC Australian Instructional Corps, Australian Military Forces.
- Lieutenant Frederick Julian Laughlin, 1st Battalion, The Trinidad Volunteers.
- Warrant Officer, Class I, Staff-Sergeant-Major (Honorary Lieutenant) William Ernest Pope, Australian Instructional Corps, Australian Military Forces.
- Sergeant-Major Horace Rapsey, The Trinidad Volunteers.
- Regimental Sergeant-Major John Anson Thompson, Ceylon Planters Rifle Corps.
- Regimental Quartermaster-Sergeant Francis Alexander Pickford Wright, Negri Sembilan Battalion, Federated Malay States Volunteer Force.
- Quartermaster (Honorary Flight Lieutenant) Leslie Griffiths Carter, Royal Australian Air Force.
- Sydney Alexander Noble, Royal New Zealand Air Force.

Civil Division

- Thomas Abell JP Member of the Exmouth Urban District Council.
- Charles Henry Ball, Chairman of the Salford, Eccles and District War Pensions, Committee.
- James Herbert Bell, Chief Superintendent (Telegraphs), Newcastle upon Tyne, General Post Office.
- Frederick Samuel Bennett, Superintendent, Metropolitan Police.
- Alderman Samuel Berry, Member of the Bridgwater Borough Council.
- Anna Chapman JP For political and. public services in Finsbury.
- Stewart Chappie, Clerk of Rules and Orders, Principal Probate Registry, Supreme Court of Judicature.
- Fred Cooper, Head Master of Beechfield Council School, Doncaster.
- John Courts, lately Curator, Royal Botanic Gardens, Kew.
- Hannah Beynon Davies JP Chairman of the Children's Sub-Committee of the North-East Glamorgan War Pensions Committee.
- George Deadman, For political and public services in the Chippenham Division of Wiltshire.
- Joseph Dickinson, Clerk of the Westhoughton Urban District Council.
- Dorothy Drage JP Chairman of the Women's Sub-Committee of the Caernarvonshire Local Employment Committee.
- Allan Dunlop, Chief Engineer, VD ED General Post Office.
- Thomas Henry Edgerton, Assistant Superintending Engineer, London Telecommunications Region, General Post Office.
- Alderman John Frederick Evans. For political, and public services in Lambeth.
- Ferdinand Roy Fairclough, Staff Officer, Colonial Office.
- David Ferrier, Superintendent of Works. Department, Carlisle and District State Management Scheme.
- Charles Godfrey Fox FCIS Chairman of the Camden Town Juvenile Advisory-Committee.
- Selina FitzHerbert Fox Founder and Director of the Bermondsey Medical Mission.
- John Edwin Furnass, lately Higher Executive Officer, Board of Inland Revenue.
- William Alexander Fyffe FIC Public Analyst for the Isle of Man.
- Hugh Peter William Giffard, Senior Staff Officer, Mines Department.
- Wilfred James Gladwell, District Officer, H.M. Coastguard, Berwick-on-Tweed
- Henry Green JP Superintendent of Lloyd's Proving House, Netherton, Worcestershire.
- Helen Stringer Conway Grimshaw. For political services in Chertsey.
- Hilda Beatrice Hargrove, Member of the Temporary Assistance Committee of the Governesses' Benevolent Institution.
- Helen Roberts Harrison ARRC Assistant Secretary, Scottish Juvenile Welfare and After-Care Office.
- William George Hawker, Head Master, Mansford Street Central School, Bethnal Green.
- David Gay Hill AMInstCE Resident Engineer for the Nene Catchment Board.
- Ella Mary Horsley. For political and public services in Normanton.
- John Hughes, Superintendent, Manchester General Post Office.
- Eric George Jones, For political and public services in County Durham.
- Muriel Jones For political and public services in Pontypridd.
- William Kerr, Superintendent, Stewartry of Kirkcudbright Police Force.
- Gladys Aline King, Staff Officer, H.M. Treasury.
- Bertha Jessie Chaster Laughrin, Matron of Bromley and District Hospital.
- Lewis Dilks Lawrence, For political and public services in West Ham.
- William Lawson JP Chairman of the Govan Juvenile Advisory Committee.
- Kathleen Mary Lines, Head of the Photographs and Illustrations Section, British Broadcasting Corporation.
- Helen Locke, F.E.I.S., Superintendent, South Carntyne Junior Instruction Centre.
- Percy John Luck, For political and public services in Bromley, Kent.
- Amy McCarthy JP For political and public services in Derby.
- John Graham Mallett, Commandant, Metropolitan Special Constabulary.
- Annie Amelia Marsh. For political and public services in Glamorganshire.
- Thomas Walton Maughan, Staff Officer, Grade I, Ministry of Transport.
- Wilfred Bernard Mercer MC Agricultural Organiser for Cheshire, and Principal of the Reaseheath Farm Institute.
- Louisa Jane Morrall, Head Mistress, Harpfield Council Junior Mixed School, Stoke-on-Trent.
- Captain (Quarter-Master) John William Newham, Superintendent Relieving Officer of Nottingham.
- John Page JP Member of the Kidderminster Rural District Council.
- Eustace Rayne Parmiter, Senior Staff Clerk, Ministry of Labour.
- Charlotte Helene Paterson JP For political and public services in East Dorset.
- Frederick Edward Pettitt, Staff Officer, H.M. Office of Works and Public Buildings.
- Frederic Pollock, For political services in the East of Scotland.
- Thomas Linton Daniel Porter, Chairman of the Ilford and Romford War Pensions Committee.
- Enid Mary Comley Prentice, lately personal Shorthand Typist to the Secretary of State for Foreign Affairs.
- Mary Anne Quinlan, Woman Inspector (Maternity and Child Welfare Services, London and Home Counties), Ministry of Health.
- Adelaide Mary Rayner. For political and public services in Cheshire.
- Henry Birkby Reid, Public Assistance Officer, Dumfries.
- Lucy Barrow Richards. For political and public services in Winchester.
- Mary Rickett. For political and public services in Sheffield.
- Alexander Carr Rick wood, For political and public services in Hertford.
- William Edwin Roberts, lately Head Master, Hemingford Street Central Boys School, Birkenhead.
- Edward Donald Ross, Staff Officer and Superintendent of the Registry, Department of Health for Scotland.
- John Murray Rusk, Senior Staff Officer, Post Office Stores Department, General Post Office.
- George Frederick Setchell, Superintendent and Deputy Chief Constable, Bedfordshire Constabulary.
- Arthur Sharp, District Officer, Newcastle-District Unemployment Assistance Board.
- Edward Leo Sharrock, Chief Preventive-Officer, Gravesend, Board of Customs and Excise.
- George Edmund Shaw, Chief Clerk, Southern Area, Devonport, War Office.
- Captain George Edward Shelley, Retired-Officer. War Office.
- William Duncan Simpson, Chief Area Officer, Edinburgh, Ministry of Pensions.
- Frank Smith. Superintendent, Metropolitan Police.
- Harry Peace Smith, Head Master, South Road Boys' Council School, Poole.
- Winifred Clara Freda Stickland, lately Secretary of the National Association for the Prevention of Tuberculosis.
- John George Bosworth Stone, Chairman of the Canterbury Public Assistance Committee.
- Jean Ferguson Tennant, Head Mistress, Maidenhall Infants' School, Luton.
- David Thirsk JP Vice-chairman of the Birmingham Local Employment Committee.
- Elinor Anne Goring-Thomas. For political services in London and the Home Counties.
- Thomas Morris Thomas, Head Master, Gwendraeth Valley Council School, Pontyberem, Carmarthenshire.
- Gwendoline Elizabeth Tod. For political and public services in the Gravesend division of Kent.
- Isabella Dora Tyas, Travelling Officer, Central Committee on Women's Training and Employment, Ministry of Labour.
- Cicely Alice Mary Vaughan. For political and public services in Bristol.
- Mary Margaret Charlotte Avant-Washington JP For political and public services in Dawlish, Devonshire.
- Allan Crabtree Watson, Superintendent and Deputy Chief Constable, Bootle Borough Police.
- Mary Margaret Jeannie Watt. For political and public services in North Cumberland.
- Commander Herbert Francis Whitworth MRCS RNVR Rail Transport Officer, Admiralty.
- Walter William Williamson, For political and public services in Rutland.
- Thomas Wilson, For political services in Springburn, Glasgow.
- Ursula Dorothea Wimble, Head of the Translation Section, Air Ministry.
- Edith Mary Wisdom RRC For political and public services in Sudbury, Suffolk.
- Frances Vernon Yonge. For political and public services in Staffordshire.

British India

- Esme Eastley (wife of C. M. Eastley, Solicitor), Bombay.
- Amin Ahmed, Judge of the Presidency Small Cause Court, Calcutta, Bengal.
- Captain Ashiq Hussain, Member of the Punjab Legislative Assembly, President, Municipal Committee, Multan, Punjab.
- Terence Dan Callaghan, on special duty in charge of the Pondicherry Land Customs Frontier Staff.
- Peter Anthony D'Abrew, Deputy Registrar, Appellate Side, High Court of Judicature at Fort William in Bengal.
- Ainslie Clifford William Dessa, Indian Medical Department, X-Ray Department, Irwin Hospital, Delhi.
- Herbert Alexander Ross Dewey, Extra Assistant Commissioner, Central Provinces and Berar.
- Reginald Drake, Officer Supervisor, Military Secretary's Branch, Army Headquarters, India.
- Khan Bahadur Abdul Haiy Elhashmy, lately Indian Assistant, Political Agency, Bahrain, Persian Gulf.
- Honorary Lieutenant Raja Haider Zaman Khan, of Khanpur, Chief of the Gakhars, District Hazara, North-West Frontier Province.
- Hyam Shalom Israel, Revenue Assistant Commissioner, Bombay.
- Rao Bahadur Manilal Kashidas Kaji, Assistant Secretary to the Resident for the States of Western India.
- Sardar Bahadur Kartar Singh, Honorary Magistrate, Lahore, Punjab.
- Diwan Bahadur Gopaldas Hassanand Keswani, Indian Service of Engineers, Executive Engineer, Sind.
- Khan Khurshid Ali Khan, Member, Council of State, Lahore, Punjab.
- Rao Bahadur Krishnaji Venkatesh Koundinya, Assistant Commissioner, Southern Division, Bombay.
- Captain Henry Patrick Tabor Lattey, Honorary Treasurer and Secretary, India Rifle Club.
- Ross Henry Donald Lowis, Indian Political Service, Assistant Political Agent
- South Waziristan. Alan Eugene Cecil McGavin, Diwan, Nandgaon State, Eastern States Agency.
- Ralph Noel McMorran, I.S.O., Assistant Secretary to the Government of the North-West Frontier Province.
- William Stanislaus Martin, Indian Medical Department, Civil Surgeon, Coonoor, The Nilgiris, Madras.
- Manick Lall Mullick, Honorary Magistrate, Sealdah, Bengal.
- Guduvancheri Cathirvelu Natarajan Mudaliar, Superintendent, Government Printing, Central Provinces and Berar.
- Percy Harry Packer, on special duty as Inspector in charge of the Karikal Land Customs Frontier Staff.
- Rai Bahadur Pitamber Pant, Civil Surgeon, Etawah, United Provinces.
- M. R. Ry. Rad Bahadur Kanthadai Rangaswami Ayyangar Avargal ISO Madras Police, Deputy Superintendent of Police, Madras.
- Khan Bahadur Saiyid Ahmad Husain Rizvi, Member of the United Provinces Legislative Council, Honorary Special Magistrate, Lucknow, United Provinces.
- Arthur Kenneth Robertson, Assistant Commissioner of Police, Calcutta, Bengal.
- Hubert Guy Ryan, lately Station Superintendent and Honorary Transportation Officer, North-Western Railway, Delhi.
- Jitendranath Sen Gupta, Secretary, Bengal National Chamber of Commerce, Bengal.
- Rai Bahadur Jawahir Lai Sinha, managing director, Ghazipur District Co-operative Bank, United Provinces.
- Subedar Major Sardar Bahadur Sohan Singh, Sub-Registrar, Sialkot, Punjab.
- Philip Stone, Chief Ground Engineer, Bombay Flying Club, Limited, Bombay.
- William Philip Todhunter, Officer Supervisor, Office of the Director of Medical Services in India, Army Headquarters.
- Amarchand Sharma Virlley, Organising Secretary, Boy Scouts Association, Bihar.

Burma

- Henry Charles Mills, Messrs. Mawchi Mines, Ltd., Burma.

Colonies, Protectorates, etc.

- George Amos, Office Assistant, Secretariat, and Clerk of Executive and Legislative Councils, Gambia.
- Abdul Aziz, First Grade Asiatic Clerk, Provincial Administration, Tanganyika Territory.
- Khan Bahadur Sheikh Ali Ba-akza. For public services in the Aden Protectorate.
- Amy Barclay, Matron, Limassol Hospital, Cyprus.
- Samuel Alexander Bill, For missionary services in Nigeria.
- William Bruce Mortimer De Grasse, For public services in the Leeward Islands.
- Mildred Earl, Nursing Sister, Nigeria.
- Rita Fenoulhet, Matron, Special Grade, General Hospital, Singapore, Straits Settlements.
- George Andrew Grieve, For services to education in Kenya.
- John Maxwell Hall MRCS LRCP Colonial Medical Service, Senior Sanitary Medical Officer, Jamaica.
- Mehmet Raif Hussein, District Judge, Cyprus.
- Sydney Baber Isaacs, Superintendent of Works, St. Vincent, Windward Islands.
- Peter Jones, Senior Stationmaster, Nigerian Railway.
- Major William Knaggs VD ED Pay and Quartermaster, Inspector of Constabulary, Trinidad.
- Walter Augustus Knight, Commissioner of Carriacou, Windward Islands.
- Diego Salvador Monteiro, Office Superintendent, Secretariat, Somaliland Protectorate.
- Pauline Versfeld Murray For medical services in the Nyasaland Protectorate.
- Raja Ratnam Nalliah. For public services in Ceylon.
- Alan Kenneth Park, For public services in Palestine.
- William Quansah, Colonial Customs Service, Collector of Customs, Gold Coast.
- Charles Eliot Gordon Russell, Colonial Administrative Service, Assistant District Officer, Tanganyika Territory.
- George William Sindle, Government Printer, Palestine.
- Albert Edward Spencer, Computer, Land and Survey Department, Uganda Protectorate.
- Mary Strickland. For nursing services in Sierra Leone.

Diplomatic Service and Overseas List

- John Dick Braid, a British subject resident in Copenhagen.
- Harry Leslie Baldwin Coe, Assistant Archivist at His Majesty's Embassy in Cairo.
- Robert Feaster, until recently Chief Sanitary Inspector, Sudan Medical Service.
- John Ghirlando, until recently British Pro-Consul at Tripoli.
- Gertrude Emily Goodband, Matron of the Victoria Hospital, Tientsin.
- Marjory Hill, Matron of the Anglo-American Hospital, Madrid.
- Charlotte Josephine King, Clerk at His Majesty's Consulate-General, Chicago.
- John Eric Lowe, until recently British Vice-Consul at Jibuti.
- Gertrude Margry, Secretary to the British Government Representative on the Board of the Suez Canal Company.
- George Thomas Saward, British Pro-Consul at Palma.
- Joseph Teen, British Pro-Consul at Damascus.

Dominions

- George James Armstrong, Assistant District Officer, Basutoland, seconded for duty in the Secretariat at Maseru.
- Sybil Jean Campbell, of Narrandera, State of New South Wales; for charitable services.
- Florence May Dagmar Clift. For services in connection with charitable movements, West Maitland, State of New South Wales.
- Arthur Brownlow Corbett, Deputy-Director in Queensland, Postmaster-General's Department, Commonwealth of Australia.
- Frank Dalby Davison, For literary services in the Commonwealth of Australia.
- Mysie Kennedy Davy. For social welfare services in the State of New South Wales.
- Phyllis Dean. For services in connection with philanthropic movements in the Commonwealth of Australia.
- Cecil Freer, For public services in the Northern Territory, Commonwealth of Australia.
- Christina Gordon. For charitable services in the Northern Territory, Commonwealth of Australia.
- Joshua Hadfield, Secretary, Australian Engineers' Union (Tasmanian Branch).
- Frances Margaret Hagon. For social welfare services in the Commonwealth of Australia.
- Gwendoline Gretchen Hoddinott, Administrative Secretary, Royal New Zealand Society for the Health of Women and Children.
- Constance Mary Hosier, Confidential Secretary to the Secretary, Royal Empire Society.
- Elsie Muriel Jones, Matron of the Leper Station, Channel Island, Northern Territory, Commonwealth of Australia.
- Ethel Anne Kidd JP For social welfare services in the Dominion of New Zealand.
- Francis McDermott, For services in connection with industrial organisations in the State of Tasmania.
- Annie McVicar JP For public and social welfare services in the Dominion of New Zealand.
- William Francis Merrell, Inspector-General in Bankruptcy, and Registrar, Victoria, Attorney-General's Department, Commonwealth of Australia.
- George Millar, a mining engineer of Runanga, Dominion of New Zealand.
- Frederick John Mills, For social welfare services in the State of South Australia.
- Robert Lloyd Pollett, lately Town Clerk, Salisbury, Southern Rhodesia.
- Richard Rowland JP of Kanye, Bechuanaland Protectorate. For public services.
- Ella Louisa Smith JP For services in connection with charitable movements in the Commonwealth of Australia.
- Margaret Thomson, of Wankie, Southern Rhodesia. For social welfare services.
- Emily Locke Webber, Confidential Clerk and Typist, Governor's Office, Southern Rhodesia.
- William Perkin Williams, For social welfare services in the Dominion of New Zealand.

Honorary Officers

- Harrison Kachingwe, Clerk, Higher Division, Grade I, Tanganyika Territory.
- Jacob Kisselov, Administrative Officer, Palestine.
- Sheikh El Abd El Muntassar. For public services in the Aden Protectorate.
- Michel Youssef Samaha AMIStructE Sanitary Engineer, Palestine.

=== Order of the Companions of Honour (CH) ===
- Howell Arthur Gwynne, lately Editor of The Morning Post.

=== Royal Red Cross (RRC) ===
First Class

- Hilda Mary Jones, Matron, Queen Alexandra's Imperial Military Nursing Service. In recognition of the exceptional devotion and competency displayed by her performance of her nursing duties in Military Hospitals.

Second Class

- Margaret Bremner, Sister, Queen Alexandra's Imperial Military Nursing Service. In recognition of the special devotion and competency displayed by her in the performance of her nursing duties in India.
- Grace Elsie Margaret Clubb, Senior Sister, Princess Mary's Royal Air Force Nursing Service. In recognition of special devotion and competency displayed by her in the nursing and care of the sick in Royal Air Force Hospitals at Home and Abroad
- Ether Mary Fowler, Senior Sister, Queen Alexandra's Royal Naval Nursing Service
- Mary Penelope D'Exeter Jordan, Superintending Sister, Queen Alexandra's Royal Naval Nursing Service

=== Kaisar-i-Hind Gold Medal for public services in India ===
- Ethel Selina Hastings Brackenbury (wife of C. F. Brackenbury CSI Indian Civil Service, Chief Secretary to the Government of Madras), Madras.
- Doris, Lady Burton (wife of Sir Geoffrey Burton, Financial Commissioner, Central Provinces and Berar).
- Jessie Margaret Gerrard, Indian Educational Service, Principal, Lady Willingdon Training College, Madras.
- Dhanvanthi Rama Rau (wife of Benegal Rama Rau, Indian Civil Service, Deputy High Commissioner for India, London).
- Sarah Janneson Rankine (Glas.), Medical Officer, St. Margaret's, Hospital for Women and Children, Poona City, Bombay.
- Mary Hilda Youle Remfry MRCS LRCP (wife of Mr. Justice C. O. Remfry), Bengal.
- Gurusaday Dutt, Indian Civil Service, Secretary to the Government of Bengal in the Public Health and Local Self-Government Department, Bengal.
- Major John Michael Pereira MBE Indian Medical Department (retired), Superintendent, Patna Medical College Hospital, Bihar.
- Ralph Randles Stewart Principal, Gordon College, Rawalpindi, Punjab.
- Hari Vishwanath Tilak FRCSE Medical Practitioner, Bombay.

=== Air Force Cross ===
- Squadron Leader Francis Victor Beamish
- Flying Officer Arthur Edmond Clouston (Reserve of Air Force Officers)
- Squadron Leader Arthur William Baynes McDonald
- Squadron Leader Wilfred Leslie Freebody
- Flight Lieutenant Ian Ross Grant
- Squadron Leader Arthur George Loton (Reserve of Air Force Officers)

=== Air Force Medal ===
- Flight Sergeant Jack Rawlinson
- Flight Sergeant Jack Williams

=== British Empire Medal ===
==== Military Division ====
For Gallantry

- Naik Barkat Singh, 10th Battalion, 2nd Punjab Regiment, Indian Army.

For Meritorious Service

- Herbert Ashley Ludlow Ford, Leading Seaman, O.N.
- Patrick Daniel Murphy, Chief Shipwright, First Class, O.N., Royal Australian Navy
- Corporal Harold John March, Royal Army Service Corps.
- Staff-Sergeant Albert Roylance, Royal Army Service Corps.
- Frank Edward Winter, Sergeant, Royal Engineers.
- Sergeant Ernest Henry Hanson, Singapore Volunteer Corps, Straits Settlements Volunteer Force.
- Quartermaster-Sergeant George Beverley Knaggs, The Trinidad Light Horse.
- Company Quartermaster-Sergeant Michael Manning, The Royal Inniskilling Fusiliers, attached The Gold Coast Regiment, Royal West African Frontier Force.
- Company Quartermaster-Sergeant Dudley Price, The Trinidad Light Infantry.
- Sergeant Alfred Shipwright, Penang and Province Wellesley Volunteer Corps, 3rd Battalion, Straits Settlements Volunteer Force.

==== Civilian Division ====
For Meritorious Service

- Magor Bok Ciner, Corporal, Equatorial Province Police, Sudan.
- Babu Panchanan Ghose, Sub-Divisional Officer, Government House, Calcutta, Bengal.
- Ivan Lionel de Silva Goonetilleke, Sub-Inspector, Ceylon Police. Mohamed
- Roland Veens Gray, Engineer-in-charge, Government Printing Office, Canberra, Commonwealth of Australia.
- Arthur John Hewett, Lineman, Postmaster-General's Department, Fitzroy Crossing, State of Western Australia.
- Thomas Hooke, Constable, British Section, Palestine Police.
- Elinor Mary Jones, Supervisor (Telephones), Liverpool, General Post Office.
- Babu Basanta Kumar Kastha, Forest Ranger, Chandpai Range (Khulna), Bengal.
- Cecil Kennedy, Constable, British Section, Palestine Police.
- Walter John Baveystock Last, Sorter, South Western District Office, London Postal Region, General Post Office.
- Patrick Joseph McGill, First Sergeant, British Section, Palestine Police.
- John Kenyon Parker, Detective Assistant Inspector, British Section, Palestine Police.
- Suleiman Said, Inspector, Palestine Police.
- Syed Amir Shah, Head Clerk, Office of the Director of Public Instruction, North West Frontier Province, India.
- John Slevin, Sub-Postmaster, Creetown, Kirkcudbrightshire, General Post Office.
- John William Stocks, Postman, Leicester, General Post Office.
- Ann Beesley Wallis, Assistant Supervisor (Telephones), Rhyl, General Post Office.
- John Edward Watson MM Head Gardener and Caretaker, Imperial War Graves Commission, Belgium.
- Solomon Weissberg, Sub-Inspector, Palestine Police.
- Tom York, Postman-Driver, Carmarthen, General Post Office.
- Noor bin Yusuf, Chief Sub-Inspector, Federated Malay States Police.

=== Queen's Police Medal|King's Police Medal (KPM) ===
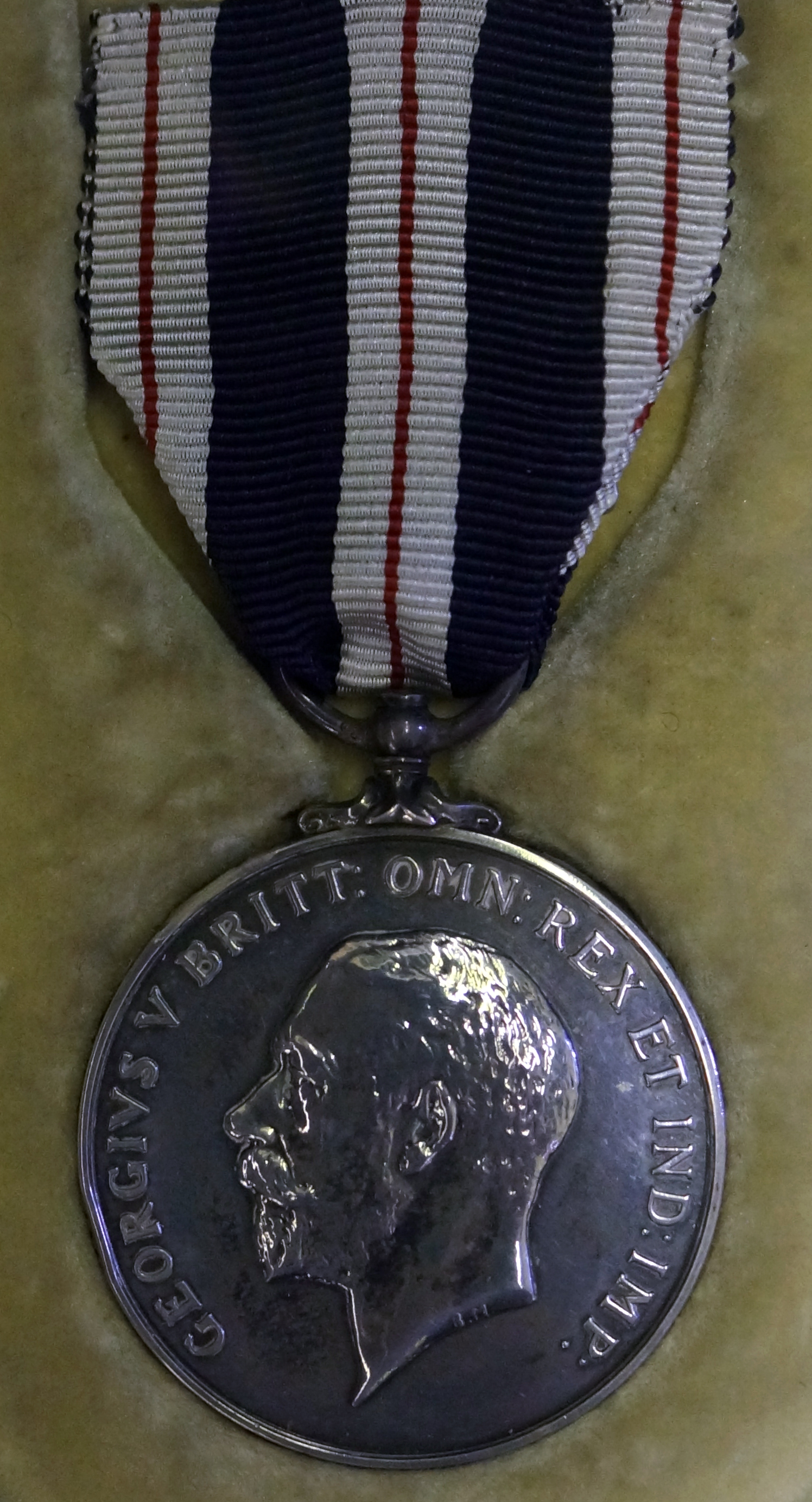
King's Police Medal with the riband for gallantry

For Gallantry

England and Wales

- Sidney Norman Barrett, Sergeant, Norwich City Police Force
- Frederick Raymond Beresford, Constable, Newark-on-Trent Borough Police Force
- Cecil Frank Cavalier, Constable, Metropolitan Police Force
- John William Chesterman, Constable, Metropolitan Police Force
- Charles Percy Cole, Constable, Cornwall Constabulary
- Stanley Dobson, Constable, Lancashire Constabulary
- Edward Ernest Freeland, Constable, Metropolitan Police Force
- John Hearn MM Constable, Metropolitan Police Force
- Arthur Ronald Hill, Constable, Wiltshire Constabulary
- Ernest John Mowl, Constable, Leicester City Police Force
- Samuel Patterson, Sergeant, North Riding of Yorkshire Constabulary
- Howard James Perry, Constable, Metropolitan Police Force
- Robert Arthur Sebborn, Constable, Liverpool City Police Force
- Joseph Sewell, Constable, City of London Police Force
- Robert Mclntyre Starkey, Constable, Metropolitan Police Force
- Ernest Walter Swayne, Constable, Metropolitan Police Force
- Harry Joseph Turnell, Constable, Metropolitan Police Force
- Charles Raymond Twigg, Constable, Derbyshire Constabulary
- Tom Breaks, Superintendent, Sheffield City Police Force and Chief Officer of the Fire Brigade
- Aylmer Newton George Firebrace, Commander, RN (retd), Deputy Chief Officer, London Fire Brigade
- Hedley Peters OBE JP
- William Charles Warren, Senior Superintendent, London Fire Brigade

Scotland

- James Evans, Fireman, Edinburgh City Fire Brigade

Australia

- Frank William Portingale, Constable, Victoria Police

British India

- Henry Donald Mortimer Scott, Indian Police, Punjab — A Bar to the King's Police Medal
- Ambalal Shamaldas, Constable, Bombay Police
- Anis Ali Khan, Sub-Inspector, United Provinces Police
- Major William Reginald Bridgewater Williams, Indian Army, Assam Rifles
- Bhotu Gurung, Subadar, Assam Rifles
- Balbahadur Gurung, Subadar, Assam Rifles
- Khanizaman, Constable, North-West Frontier Province Police
- Sher Azam, Sub-Inspector, North-West Frontier Province Police
- Lionel Walter Sarre, Indian Police, Sind
- Sher Muhammad, Constable, Sirohi State Police

Burma

- Maung Po Kyai, Sub-Inspector, Amherst District, Burma Police

Colonies, Protectorates and Mandated Territories

- Edwin Emmanuel Cesar, Superintendent of Police, Mauritius
- Edward Gaba, Constable, Nigeria Police
- Abdul Rani Bin Koming, Lance-Corporal, Federated Malay States Police
- Gerald Beverley Liddelow, Inspector of Constabulary, Trinidad
- Albert Edmund Stafford, Sergeant-Major of Police, Mauritius

For Distinguished Service

England and Wales

- George Campbell Vaughan, Chief Constable, West Riding of Yorkshire Constabulary
- Captain Athelstan Popkess, Chief Constable, Nottingham City Police Force
- Thomas Alfred Burrows, Chief Constable, Reading Borough Police Force
- Robert Gardiner MBE Assistant Chief Constable, Durham Constabulary
- John Richard Dodd MBE Assistant Chief Constable, Cheshire Constabulary
- Edward Percy Bell, Chief Superintendent and Deputy Chief Constable, Newcastle upon Tyne City Police Force
- James Booth MBE Chief Superintendent, City of London Police Force
- William Taylor, Superintendent, Northumberland Constabulary

Scotland

- William Patrick Chambers, Superintendent, Midlothian Constabulary
- George Gray, Superintendent, Renfrew Constabulary

Northern Ireland

- Robert Browne, Head Constable, Royal Ulster Constabulary

Isle of Man

- Charles Joshua Faragher, Chief Inspector

Australia

- Phillip James Cook, First Class Sergeant of Police, Federal Capital Territory, Commonwealth of Australia
- Naduba, Police Sergeant-Major, New Guinea Police
- Omeli, Police Sergeant-Major, Nauru
- Robert Reid, Senior Constable, Tennant Creek, Northern Territory of Australia
- Charles David Alexander Richardson, Chief Officer of Fire Brigades, New South Wales

British India

- John Sebastian Wilkes, Indian Police, Madras
- James Walter Rowland, Indian Police, Bombay
- Norman Coombs, Chief Officer of the Bombay
- Municipal Fire Brigade Henry Carter Hunt, Indian Police, Bengal
- Cyril Weale, Indian Police, Bengal
- Pulin Chandra Chakrabatti, Inspector, Bengal Police
- Santosh Kumar Gupta, Officiating Inspector, Bengal Police
- Malcolm Kenneth Johnston, Deputy Commissioner of Police, Special Branch, Calcutta Police
- Major Erichsen Shafton Ewen Rerrie, Military Intelligence Officer and Additional Superintendent, Bengal Police
- Hugh Aubrey St Clair Stracey, Indian Police, United Provinces
- Jai Karan Singh, Inspector, United Provinces Police
- Naubat Rai Sahney, Indian Police, Punjab
- Khan Sahib Mir Mumtaz Husain, Deputy Superintendent, Punjab Police

Newfounland

- Patrick Joseph O'Neill, OBE Chief of Police, Newfoundland

Burma

- Arthur George Adams, Officiating Deputy Inspector-General, Burma Police
- Sardar Bahadur Bhim Sing Rawat OBI Subedar Major, Northern Shan States Battalion, Burma Frontier Force

Colonies, Protectorates and Mandated Territories

- Frederick Charles Brookes, Assistant Superintendent of Police, Kenya
- Roger Owen Wingfield Marchant Davis, Assistant Commissioner of Police, Federated Malay States
- Thomas Henry King, Inspector-General of Police, Hong Kong
- Bartle Langran, Deputy Inspector-General of Police, Ceylon
- Michael Joseph McConnell, District Superintendent of Police, Palestine
- Charles Reginald Morrish DSC Assistant Commissioner of Police, Federated Malay States
- Edward Herbert Nelson, Acting Sergeant-Superintendent of Constabulary, Trinidad
- William Arthur Orrett, First Class Inspector of Police, Jamaica
- Alfred Heedman Richards, Sergeant-Major of Police, Leeward Islands
- Faiz Stambouli, Inspector of Police, Palestine
- Wong Chin Yok, Inspector of Police, Straits Settlements

=== Imperial Service Medal (ISM) ===
In recognition of long and meritorious service

- Guntur Balajee Singh, Dalayat (retired), District Court, Guntur, Madras
- Lalbhai Ajanbhai Shaikh, Jamadar (retired), Bombay Excise Constabulary, Staff Ahmedabad Division, Bombay
- Muhammad Wali, Jemadar Orderly (retired), Government House, North-West Frontier Province
