= Acoustic pod =

Specialist structure for acoustic separation

An acoustic pod is a specialized structure (module) designed to create a soundproof, quiet, private space within a room, studio, or office, ensuring confidentiality.

== History ==
The first prototypes of acoustic pods appeared in the late 19th century following the invention of the telephone. This was driven by the desire to isolate the speaker from surrounding noise. To this end, in 1877, Thomas Watson built a wooden booth and lined it with blankets.

With the advent of sound cinema (in the 1920s), the need for silence on the film set arose. Large, noisy movie cameras began to be placed in soundproof booths (manufactured by Western Electric) to prevent noise from being picked up on the audio recording.

In the mid-20th century, the music industry began to develop rapidly, and the need arose to create recording studios and vocal and instrumental booths within them. Performers (vocalists, drummers) were recorded separately from one another, which prevented sound from reaching neighboring microphones.

The office boom of the 21st century highlighted the problem of excessive noise and a lack of privacy for phone calls. Since 2000, office architecture has increasingly incorporated acoustic pods for individual work and business meetings, allowing for greater flexibility in office space use and adapting workspaces to a post-pandemic work culture.

== Types of Acoustic Pod ==
Booths are categorized by purpose, size, and number of seats. Among the most common are office and vocal booths. There are also announcer booths, director's booths, and others.

=== Office Acoustic Pod ===
The vast majority of booths are designed for one, two, or four people. Larger booths are also sometimes manufactured.

Office acoustic pods are used as chat booths, Skype booths, for job interviews, as meeting rooms, or for testing various products in companies' marketing departments.

These booths are used in the offices of Microsoft, IBM, Google, Puma, Nvidia, Vodafone, Cloudera, Datadog, McDonald's, Deloitte, General Electric, Siemens, Monobank, and many other companies, and has been noted as being used by the Ministry of Defense for additional privacy within their offices.

A modern acoustic pod is a self-contained module. Its construction typically consists of multilayer panels with sound-absorbing materials, laminated glass, and airtight door seals.

There are several manufacturers of office acoustic pods around the world, such as the american company “Room”, lithuanian "Narbutas", finnish "Framery", australian "Bureau", american "Poppinpod", ukrainian "Silentbox", etc.

In modern coworking spaces and office environments, office cubicles can be made available using the “product as a service” (PaaS) model. Cloud-based solutions are being implemented, allowing users to rent cubicles (by the minute or by the hour) through mobile apps.

Some manufacturers of acoustic pods offer digital services to help customers evaluate equipment before purchasing. These include web-based tools for simulating sound insulation, as well as 3D configurators with augmented reality (AR) support for visualizing the booth within an interior space.

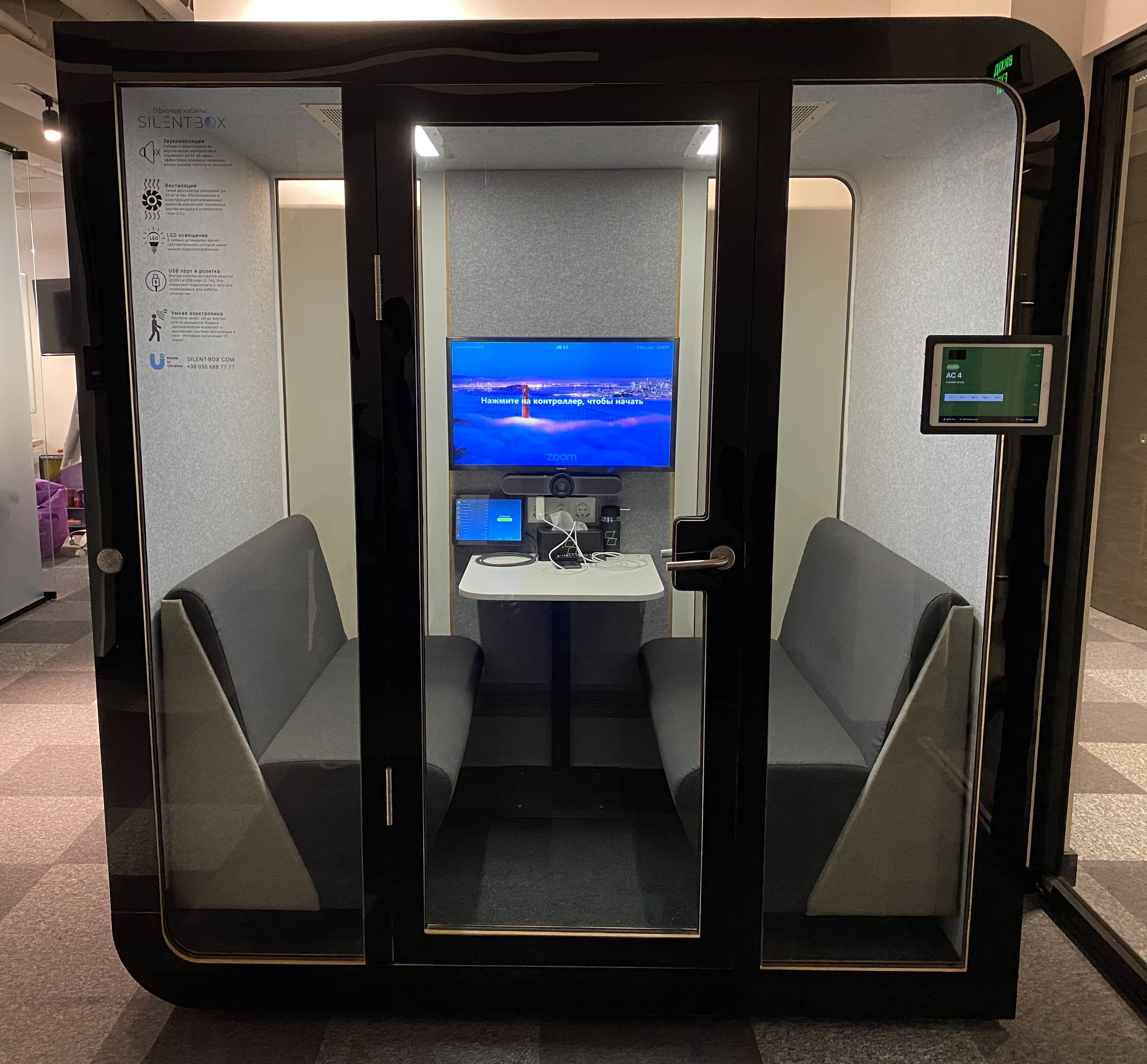
Office Acoustic Pod Silentbox Quartet

Quartet Cabin

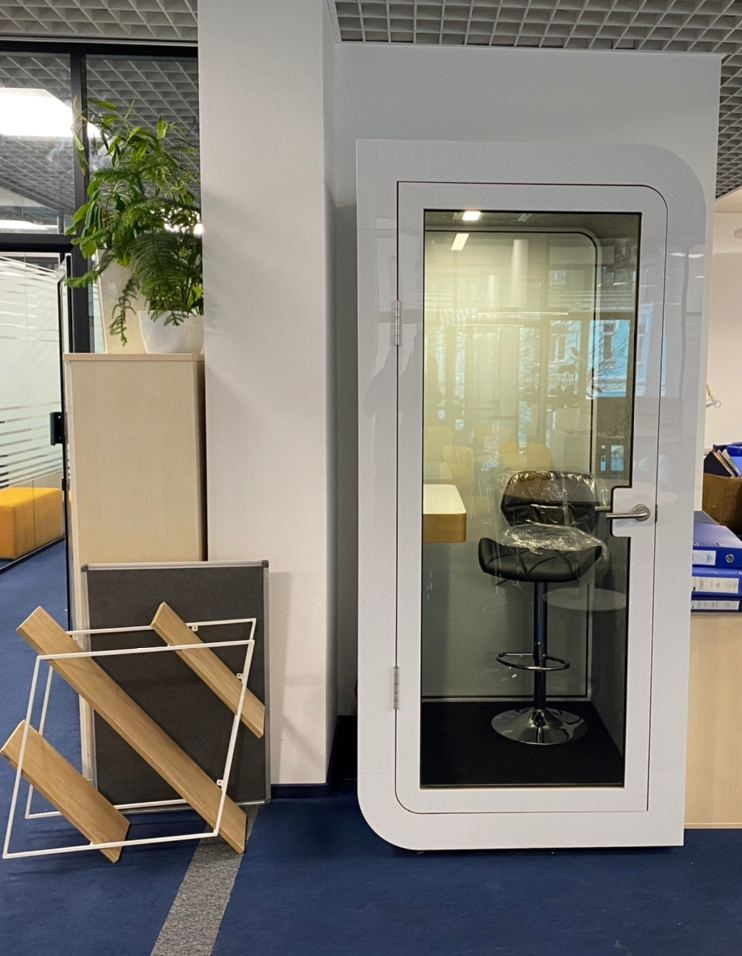
Acoustic Pod Silentbox Solo
Open-plan office with acoustic pods

Acoustic Pod (Amsterdam)

Office with Acoustic Pod

Acoustic Pod (Spain)

Business Center with Acoustic Pods

=== Music and Announcer Acoustic Pod ===
These are specialized booths used for recording podcasts, vocals, voice-overs, and musical instruments. They feature enhanced soundproofing and are equipped with special studio materials for acoustic tuning.

=== Industrial Acoustic Pod ===
They are used in factories and workshops to protect operators or equipment from intense industrial noise.

== Reasons for Popularity ==
=== The Problem of Noise in Open Spaces ===
According to research in the field of ergonomics, background noise in open-plan offices reduces employee productivity and increases stress levels. Acoustic Pods make it possible to isolate sources of noise without having to remodel the building.

=== The Development of a Hybrid Work Model ===
The increase in the number of online conferences and video calls has created a need for accessible, private meeting spaces within the office.

=== Mobility and Cost Savings ===
Unlike the construction of permanent partitions, prefabricated cubicles do not require building permits and can be moved when a company relocates.

== See also ==
- Soundproofing
- Sound recording
- Acoustics
