= Mary Lambie =

Mary Lambie may refer to:

- Mary Lambie (nurse) (1889–1971), New Zealand nurse and nursing educator
- Mary Lambie (broadcaster), New Zealand media personality and journalist
