= Lawrence Turner (disambiguation) =

Lawrence Turner (1908–1977) was a British Conservative politician.

Lawrence or Laurence Turner may also refer to:

- Laurence Arthur Turner (1864–1957), British artisan and master craftsman
- Lawrence Turner (actor) in Nine Dead (2009)
- Laurence Turner (engineer) (1886–1963), British electrical engineer
- Laurence Turner (politician), British politician
- Laurance Turner, British violinist

== See also ==
- Larry Turner (disambiguation)
