= Arthur Eggar =

British barrister and law professor (1877–1958)

Sir Arthur Eggar
- Born: 22 May 1877
- Died: 14 May 1958 (aged 80); Fowey, Cornwall
- Education: Trinity College, Cambridge
- Occupations: Barrister, colonial administrator and law professor

Sir Arthur Eggar (22 May 1877 – 14 May 1958) was a British barrister, colonial administrator and university law professor. He served as Advocate-General of Burma in 1937.

== Early life and education ==
Eggar was born on 22 May 1877, the son of Sir Henry Eggar (MVO). He was educated at Uppingham School and Trinity College, Cambridge where he took his BA in 1898. He was called to the bar by the Inner Temple in 1906.

== Career ==
Eggar served in World War I with the Royal Garrison Artillery and the Royal Air Force, rose to the rank of captain, and was mentioned in dispatches.

Eggar went to Burma where he was Professor of Law at Rangoon University from 1923 to 1937. He was a leading expert on the laws of Burma and India and published several works. Later, he received an honorary degree (LL.D) from the university in 1957. While working at the university, he also served as Government Advocate, and assisted the government in drafting legislation. In 1932, he led the prosecution team on behalf the government in the case against Saya Sen who led a rebellion against British colonial rule in Burma, and who was subsequently found guilty and hanged. In 1937, he was appointed Advocate-General of Burma. In 1938, he retired and later that year was knighted.

== Personal life and death ==
Eggar married Margaret Gibb Cowan in London in 1957. Eggar was a keen rower who introduced rowing to Burma. He was founder of the Rangoon University Boat Club serving as life president from 1923 to 1958, and edited Rowing Notes for author Steve Fairbairn.

Eggar died on 14 May 1958 at Fowey, Cornwall, aged 80.

== Honours ==
Eggar was created a Knight Bachelor in the 1938 New Year Honours.

== Publications ==
- The Hatanee, A tale of Burmese superstition (1906)
- The Government of India, Being a Portion of a Treatise on the Laws of India (1924)
- The Laws of India and Burma (1929)
- The law of evidence
- Evidence: A pocket-book of common-sense extracted from the case-law relating to evidence in British India
- Fairbairn's Rowing Notes
- The Flying Dutchman
- Autobiography of Sir Arthur Eggar (Rangoon University Boat Club Founder & Life President (1923 - 1958)
