= Cecil Patrick Blackwell =

His Honor Sir Cecil Patrick Blackwell MBE (8 November 1881 – 7 November 1944), was a British judge and Liberal Party politician.

== Background ==
Blackwell was born the eldest son of Patrick Thomas Blackwell and Cecilia Tudor Westbrook. He was educated at Blackheath Proprietary School, City of London School, University College, London and Wadham College, Oxford. In 1904 he was Secretary of the Oxford Union Society. In 1910 he married Marguérite Frances Tilleard. In 1919 he was awarded the MBE. He was awarded a knighthood in 1938 New Year Honours.

== Professional career ==
Blackwell was Puisne judge of the High Court of Judicature at Bombay, India from 1926 to 1944.

== Political career ==
Blackwell was Liberal candidate for the Kingswinford division of Staffordshire at the 1923 General Election, when he finished third. He did not stand for parliament again.

=== Electoral record ===
General Election 1923: Kingswinford
Party	Candidate	Votes	%	±%
Labour	Charles Henry Sitch	15,174	49.5	
Unionist	William Harcourt-Webb	10,862	35.4	n/a
Liberal	Cecil Patrick Blackwell	4,633	15.1	n/a
Majority		4,312	14.1	
Turnout		30,669		
Labour hold		Swing	n/a	

== See also ==
- Kingswinford (UK Parliament constituency)
- 1938 New Year Honours
- Constituency election results in the 1923 United Kingdom general election
