= 1938 New Year Honours (New Zealand) =

Annual awards for New Zealanders

The 1938 New Year Honours in New Zealand were appointments by King George VI to various orders and honours to reward and highlight good works by New Zealanders. The awards celebrated the passing of 1937 and the beginning of 1938, and were announced on 1 January 1938.

The recipients of honours are displayed here as they were styled before their new honour.

== Order of Saint Michael and Saint George ==
=== Companion (CMG) ===
- Dr Theodore Grant Gray MB ChB MPC – of Wellington; director-general of mental hospitals.
- Garnet Hercules Mackley – of Wellington; general manager, Railways Department.
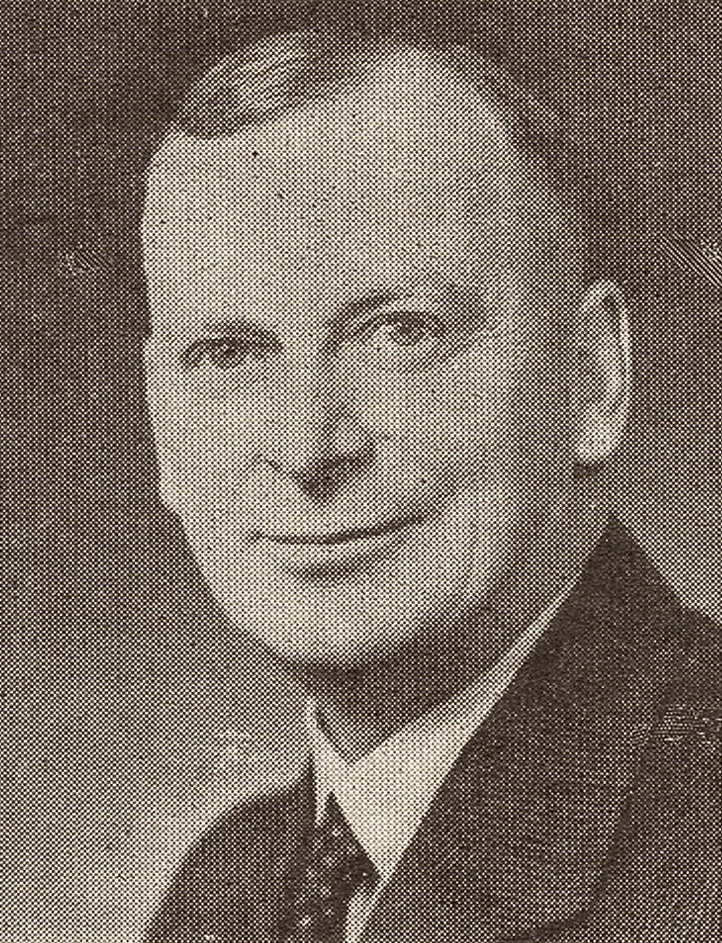
Garnet Mackley

== Order of the British Empire ==
=== Knight Commander (KBE) ===
Civil division

- Theodore Rigg MSc FIC – of Nelson; director of the Cawthron Institute.
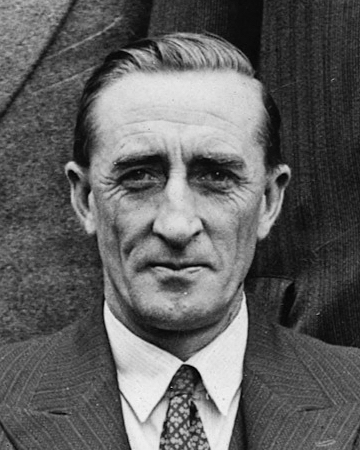
Sir Theodore Rigg

=== Commander (CBE) ===
Civil division

- Elgin Nathaniel George Poulton – of Wellington; private secretary to the Minister of Internal Affairs.

Military division

- Colonel Searle Dwyer Mason ED – of Timaru; Commander 3rd New Zealand Infantry Brigade, Southern Command, New Zealand Military Forces.

=== Officer (OBE) ===
Civil division

- Dr Edward Pohau Ellison MB ChB – chief medical officer, and deputy resident commissioner, Cook Islands.
- David John Evans JP – of Hokitika; clerk, Westland County Council.
- Mary Isabel Lambie – of Wellington; director of the Division of Nursing, Health Department.
- George McCloghrie – constructor, Royal Corps of Naval Constructors; manager of the Naval Base at Devonport, Auckland.
- John Samuel Neville – town clerk, Christchurch.

Military division

- Commander Charles Bourdas Tinley – Royal Navy; commanding officer, HMS Philomel, and naval officer in charge and superintendent, Auckland.
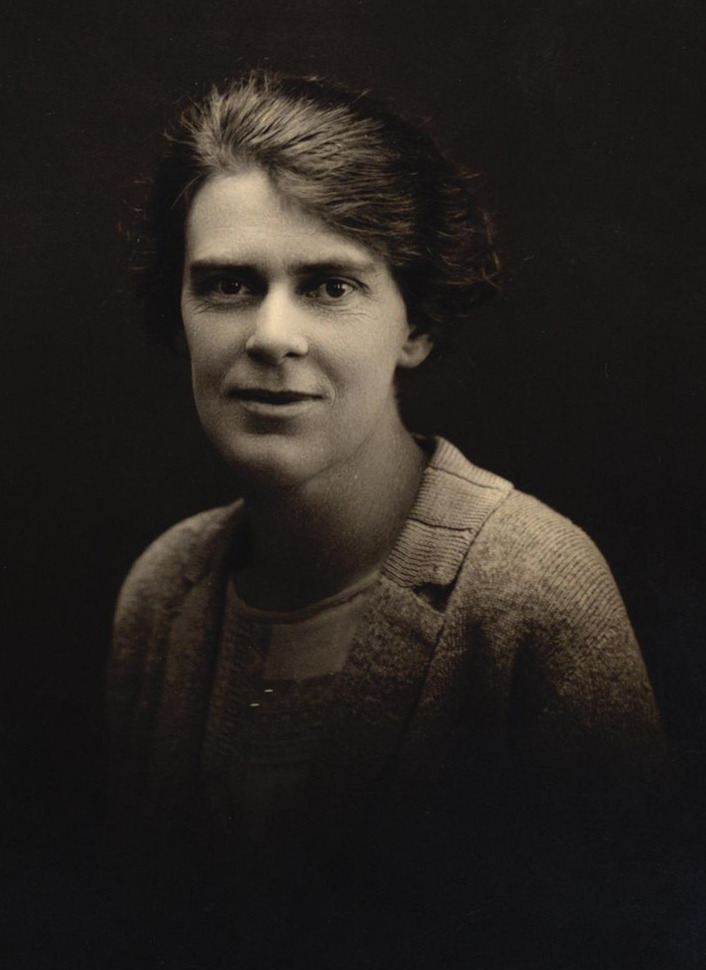
Mary Lambie

=== Member (MBE) ===
Civil division

- Gwendoline Gretchen Hoddinott – of Dunedin; administrative secretary, Royal New Zealand Society for the Health of Women and Children.
- Ethel Anne Kidd JP – of Auckland. For social-welfare services.
- Annie McVicar JP – of Wellington. For public and social-welfare services.
- George Millar – of Runanga; a mining engineer.
- William Perkin Williams – of Lower Hutt. For social-welfare services.

Military division

- Warrant Officer Class I Sydney Alexander Noble – Royal New Zealand Air Force, Hobsonville.
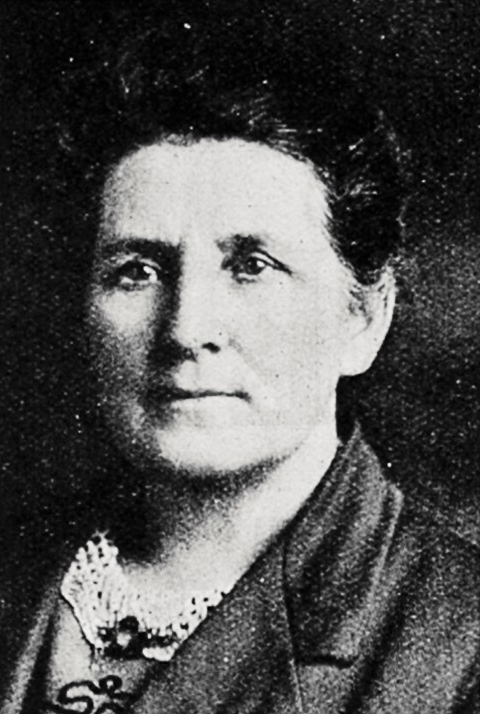
Annie McVicar
