= Anne Cochrane =

British courtier (1855–1943)

Dame Anne Annette Minna Cochrane DCVO DStJ (6 March 1855 – 6 January 1943) was a British courtier.

== Early life ==
Cochrane was born in Portsmouth, Portsea Island, Hampshire, into the Scottish Cochrane family, a noble branch of Clan Cochrane. She was the daughter of Admiral Sir Thomas John Cochrane (grandson of Thomas Cochrane, 8th Earl of Dundonald), and Rosetta Wheeler-Cuffe (daughter of Sir Jonah Wheeler-Cuffe, 1st Baronet).

== Career ==
She was invested as a Dame of Grace, Order of St John, and served as Lady-in-Waiting to HRH Princess Beatrice. She was invested as a Dame Commander, Royal Victorian Order (DCVO) in the 1938 New Year Honours.

She had several siblings and half-siblings, including a younger brother, Thomas Belhaven Henry Cochrane (1856–1925) and half-brother Alexander Baillie-Cochrane, 1st Baron Lamington (1816–1890).

== Death ==
Cochrane died in Bournemouth, Dorset, England on 6 January 1943, unmarried, at the age of 87.
