= Larry Turner =

Larry Turner may refer to:

- Larry Turner (American football) (born 1982), American football player
- Larry Turner (politician) (1939–2009), American politician
- Larry Turner (basketball) (born 1982), American basketball player
- Larry D. Turner, United States Army officer and American government official

== See also ==
- Lawrence Turner (disambiguation)
