= Franklin Sibly =

Thomas Franklin Sibly K.B.E. (25 October 1883 – 13 April 1948) was a British geologist who had a distinguished career in University administration, being first Principal of University College, Swansea (1920), and later Vice-Chancellor of the University of Wales, Principal of the University of London and from 1929 to 1946 Vice-Chancellor of the University of Reading.
