= Ned Ellison =

New Zealand public health administrator (1884–1963)

Edward Pohau Ellison

Edward Pohau Ellison OBE (26 November 1884 – 9 November 1963), generally known as Ned Ellison and also as Pohau Erihana, was a New Zealand doctor, public health administrator and rugby player.

== Biography ==
Ellison was born in Waikanae, New Zealand, on 26 November 1884. Of Māori descent, he identified with the Ngai Tahu and Te Āti Awa iwi.

Ellison attended Te Aute College and then Te Rau Theological College in Gisborne. In 1912 he began his studies in science at the University of Otago, entering medical school in 1914 and gaining his MBChB in 1919. Ellison came from a strong family rugby background; his brother Tom Ellison was captain of the first New Zealand Māori rugby team. During his school and university years he played hockey, rugby and cricket. In 1911 he was in the New Zealand Māori rugby team and at university was in the rugby and cricket teams.

His first position on qualifying in medicine in 1919 was as Medical Officer in Niue and in 1921 he was appointed as the Deputy Resident Commissioner. He was later promoted to the post of Resident Commissioner. In 1923 he moved to the Chatham Islands as Medical Officer and Resident Magistrate for two years before returning to the University of Otago to study tropical medicine which included an investigation of leprosy treatment in Makogai Island, Fiji. He then became Chief Medical Officer and Deputy Resident Commissioner of the Cook Islands from 1926 to 1927. He returned to New Zealand to succeed Peter Buck as Director of Māori Hygiene in the Department of Health from 1927 to 1931. He resumed the position of Chief Medical Officer to the Cook Islands in 1931.

Ellison returned to New Zealand in 1945 and practised medicine in Manaia, Taranaki. He retired to Taradale in 1956 and died in Napier on 9 November 1963.

Ellison made significant contributions to the health of both Māori and Pacific peoples in areas of public health, sanitation, immunisation and the treatment of tropical and infectious diseases.

== Personal life ==
Ellison was married twice and had nine children; his son Dr Tom Ellison was a general practitioner in Raglan.

== Honours and awards ==
In 1935, Ellison was awarded the King George V Silver Jubilee Medal. He was appointed an Officer of the Order of the British Empire in the 1938 New Year Honours.
