= Annie McVicar =

New Zealand community worker, local politician

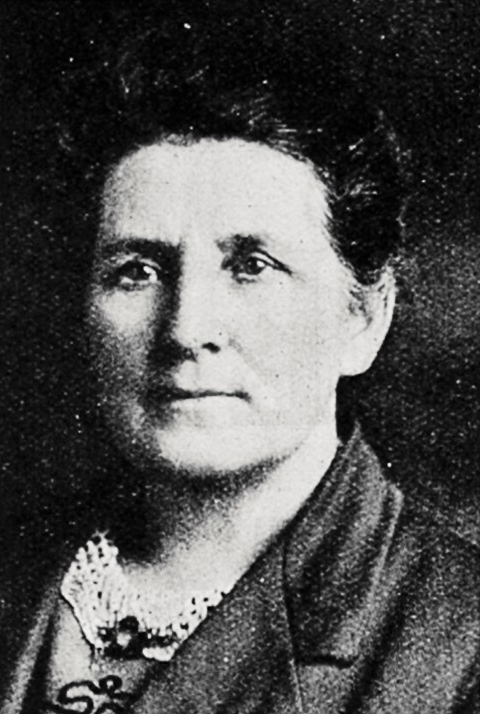
Annie McVicar

Annie McVicar MBE JP (4 November 1862 – 26 February 1954) was a New Zealand community worker and local politician, and the first woman elected to the Wellington City Council.

== Biography ==
=== Early life and career ===
She was born Ann McLachlan in Kilmartin, Argyllshire, Scotland, on 4 November 1862. She attended a state school in Kilmartin and later trained as a nurse in Glasgow. In 1888 she married Gordon McDonald, with whom she sailed to New Zealand in 1901. Gordon died in 1906 and on 9 October that same year she remarried to Alexander McVicar, a widower with three children.

From 1906 McVicar was actively engaged in both teaching and social work in Wellington. She was an early member, and later vice president, of the New Zealand Society for the Protection of Women and Children and also established the local branch of the Plunket Society in 1908, which she was also the secretary of. She frequently accompanied Plunket nurses on visits to mothers and on occasion carried out these duties by herself.

=== Political career ===
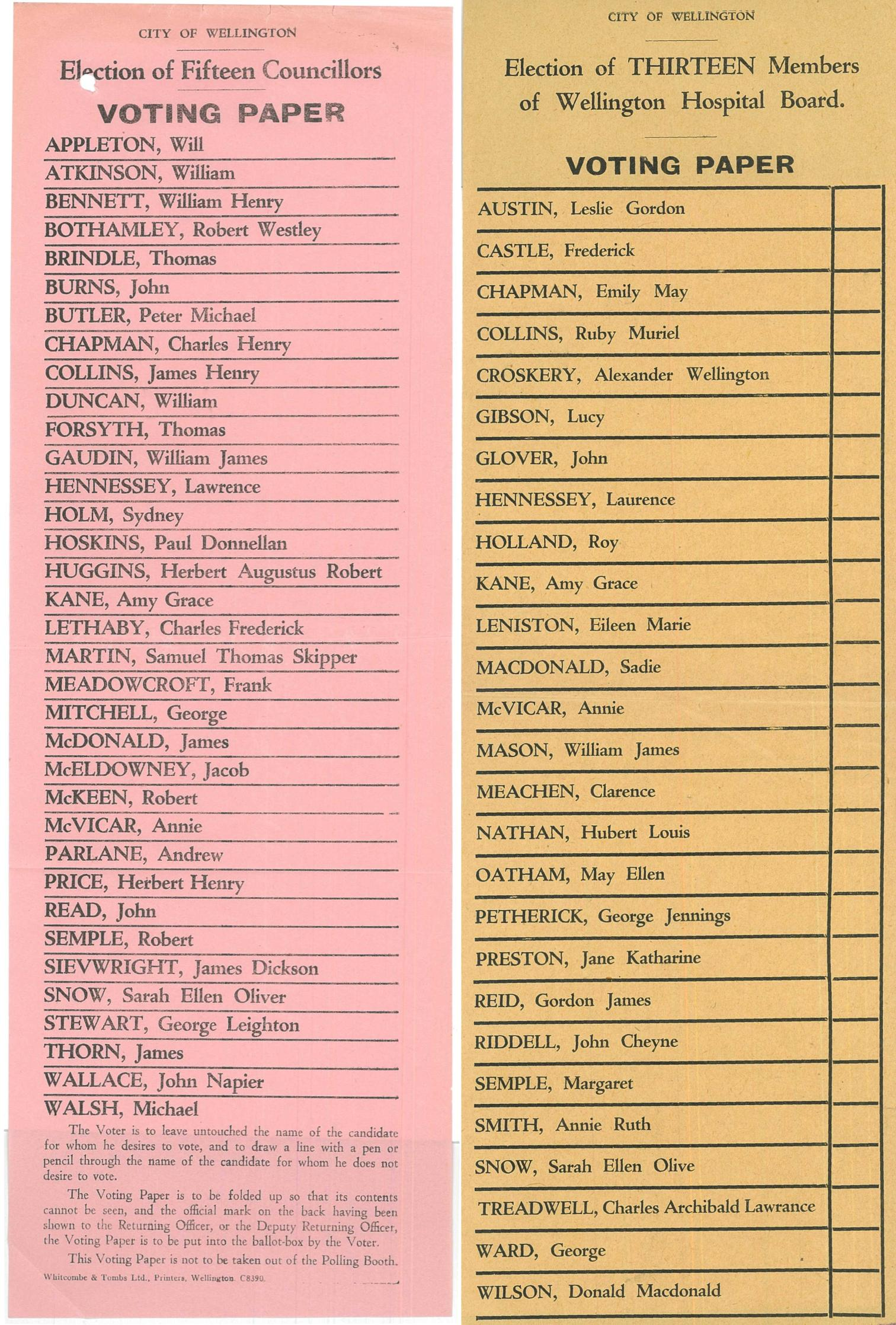
Ballot papers listing Annie McVicar

McVicar was also interested in politics. In 1913 she was the vice president of the Wellington women's branch of the Reform Party. She was one of four candidates in the 1922 election in the Wellington East electorate and came last, with 4% of the vote. She later served on the Worser Bay School committee and was chairperson of the ladies' advisory committee of Wellington Technical College from 1923 to 1949.

She was elected to the Wellington Hospital Board in 1915 and served on the body continuously until her retirement in 1938. From 1919 she was involved in distributing funds to improve conditions in maternity homes, after a large sum of money was left to the Hospital Board. In local government, as in her other activities, McVicar was known to be energetic and pragmatic, particularly when focused on her specific interests which were the education and welfare of women and children. She was then elected to the Miramar Borough Council in 1919. In 1921 Miramar amalgamated with Wellington, and she became the first woman elected to the Wellington City Council, on a Civic League ticket. An editorial in the Evening Post declared: "Never before has Wellington had a lady City Councillor, and the innovation is full of promise." She was re-elected in 1923, but was defeated in 1925.

=== Later life and death ===
In 1926 McVicar was appointed a justice of the peace, one of the first women in New Zealand to be given the office. In 1929 she was New Zealand's delegate to the International Alliance of Women for Suffrage and Equal Citizenship held in Berlin. In the 1938 New Year Honours, she was appointed a Member of the Order of the British Empire, for public and social welfare services in New Zealand. She died on 26 February 1954 in Wellington, survived by her step-children.
