= Gwendoline Trubshaw =

Welsh civil servant (1886–1954)

- Born: 20 December 1886; Ael-y-bryn, Felin-foel, Llanelli, Wales
- Died: November 8, 1954 (aged 67); London, England
- Occupation: Public official
- Relatives: Brian Trubshaw (nephew)

Dame Gwendoline Joyce Trubshaw, DBE (20 December 1886 – 8 November 1954) was a Welsh public sector official responsible for the recruitment and subsequent welfare of women who took part in support work for the First World War. She was an elected member of the Carmarthen County Council and had leading roles in a range of education and health organisations.

== Early life ==
Trubshaw was the daughter of Ernest Trubshaw and Lucy Timmis Smith Trubshaw, of Ael-y-bryn, Felin-foel, Llanelli, and was baptised on 1 April 1887. Her father was a factory manager, born in England; her nephew Brian Trubshaw became a noted test pilot.

== Career ==
Trubshaw was responsible for the recruitment of women for war service during WWI, and served as chairman of the South-West Wales War Pensions Committee and honorary secretary to the Soldiers', Sailors' and Airmen's Families Association. She served on the Carmarthenshire Naval and Military Pensions Committee in 1917. From that work, she was elected to the Carmarthen County Council in 1919, with the support of the Discharged and Demobilised Soldiers' and Sailors' Association. She was the council's first chairwoman in 1937. In 1938, she served on a committee to consider how the Contributory Pensions Act affected single women.

In 1949, Trubshaw was one of only two independent candidates to secure election in Llanelli, when all other seats in the county were won by Labour. She was governor of Llanelli County Schools and Chairman of Llanelli School of Art, a member of the Carmarthenshire Blind Society, and for four years was Chairman of the West Wales Joint Board for Mental Defectives.

In 1939, Trubshaw became the organiser for the newly-formed Women's Voluntary Service for her county. Having been a member of the Public Health Committee for nearly 27 years, she was Chairman in 1946, and in 1951 became member of the Central Health Services Council.

== Honours ==
Trubshaw received a CBE in 1920, for her wartime service. In 1938, she was elevated to Dame Commander of the British Empire (DBE).

== Personal life ==
Trubshaw lived at Cae'r Delyn, Llanelli. She died in London on 8 November 1954, aged 67 years.
