= Laurence Turner (engineer) =

British electrical engineer

Laurence Beddome Turner
- Born: 6 April 1886; Charlton, London
- Died: 28 January 1963 (aged 76)
- Education: Bedford School, King's College, Cambridge
- Scientific career
- Fields: Electrical engineering
- Workplaces: University of Cambridge

Laurence Beddome Turner MIEE (28 January 1886–6 April 1963), was a British electrical engineer, Fellow of King's College, Cambridge, and Reader in Engineering at the University of Cambridge.

== Biography ==
Born in Charlton, London on 6 April 1886, Laurence Turner was educated at Bedford School and at King's College, Cambridge as a Foundation Scholar. He worked as an electrical engineer at Siemens Brothers in London, and at Siemens & Halske in Berlin. During the First World War he became a captain at the War Office's Signals Experimental Establishment (SEE) at Woolwich, London, developing wireless telegraphy for the British Army. In 1919 he was elected as a Fellow and Director of Studies in Engineering at King's College, Cambridge. During the Second World War he became part of the team developing radar at the Admiralty Signals Establishment.

Dr Laurence Turner died on 28 January 1963.

== Publications ==
Dr Turner's publications included Wireless Telegraphy and Telephony: An Outline for Electrical Engineers and Others, 1921, and Wireless: a treatise on the theory and practice of high-frequency electric signalling, 1931.
