= Thomas Watson MacCallum =

British early radio personality

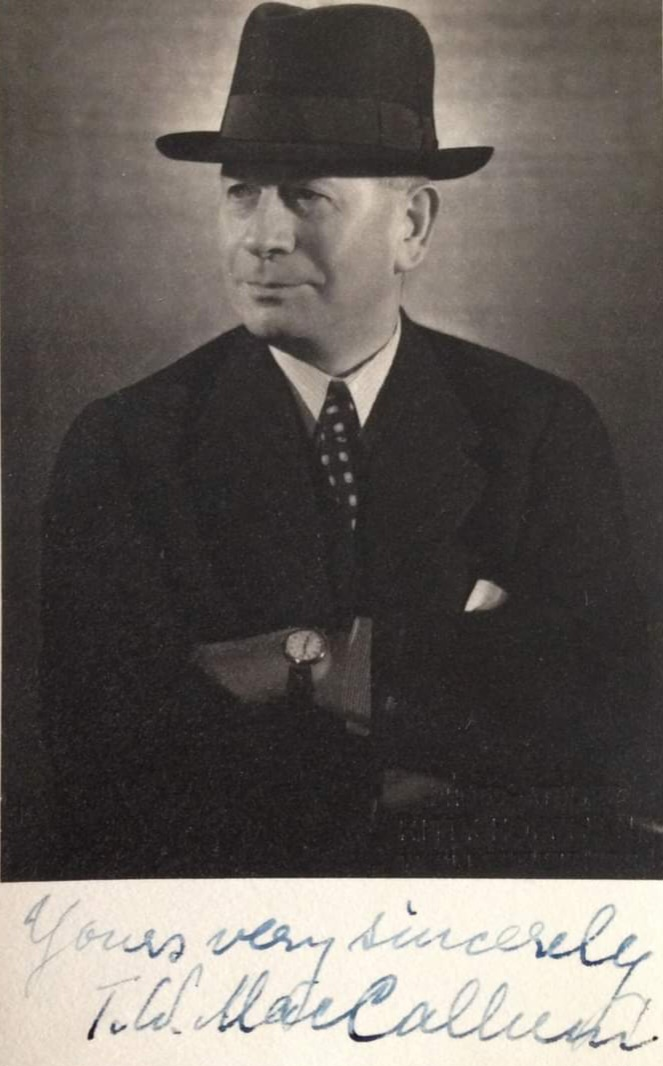
Signed postcard of Professor Thomas Watson MacCallum OBE

Thomas Watson MacCallum OBE (27 May 1881 – 2 June 1966) was a Scottish author, philologist and radio broadcaster. He is best known for his English language lessons that were broadcast from the Austrian radio station RAVAG before World War I and in the interwar period. Such was his popularity that he was featured in the lyrics of a song by Hermann Leopoldi, a famous cabaret artist. His pioneering work in radio earned him the moniker "The Uncrowned King of Radio". During a 14-year period from 1925 until 1939, he reached millions of listeners across Europe with his radio broadcasts and helped change the Austrians' perceptions of the British, for which he received an OBE in the 1938 New Year Honours.

== Early life ==
MacCallum was born on 27 May 1881 in Drumlithie, Kincardineshire.

== Career ==
=== University professor ===
At the start of the twentieth century, MacCallum was working as a professor of English at the University of Vienna. Due to the outbreak of the First World War in 1914, he had to leave his post at the university and was unable to return until after the war had ended. He resumed his duties in the 1920s and remained in Vienna until early 1939. His radio work meant that he became a local celebrity and was known at the university as the "invisible teacher". According to his own accounts, his classroom was often crowded to the doors.

The annexation of Austria by Nazi Germany in 1938 made his position as a university professor and radio broadcaster untenable. The National Socialists wanted him to broadcast Nazi propaganda during his radio shows and he refused to become a second Lord Haw-Haw, as he later noted himself in an article in a Scottish weekly publication. This meant that he had to leave Austria for a second time and on this occasion took with him his wife Emily Bertha Mayer and daughter Margaret Duncan MacCallum.

He later wrote, "If today I am much poorer after deciding that I could not live under Nazi rule, I have no regrets of having left Vienna when I did. I shall always consider it as one of the wisest steps I have taken."

The week after Hitler seized power in Austria, MacCallum was asked to broadcast events of the day. A Nazi professor instructed him to say that Austria is now part of the Greater German Reich and will probably remain so forever. MacCallum changed this to "and may remain so for a long time."

=== Interwar years ===
It is unclear when MacCallum returned to Austria after the end of the First World War, but he must have returned before 1921, as his daughter, Margaret MacCallum was born in 1921 in Salzburg. At the time of her birth, he was working as the director of an orphanage that was situated on the grounds of Schloss Kleßheim in the former Kavalierhaus.

Excerpt from the Salzburger Volksblatt published in 1921 in German (translated into English):

British children's home in Kleßheim Castle.

Bright children's cheers resound from the large meadow, which stretches in the middle of the wide park in front of the terrace of the summer palace up to the white wall that encloses a former princely residence. Whenever the weather allows, girls and boys from six to fourteen years of age play around in simple but durable and practical home clothes under the leadership of two sisters and the head of the home, Professor MacCallum. And the professor has given up on being a university lecturer and is playing along! No, there really isn't anything lecturer-like about him, the Scottish scholar, who is familiar with Austrian nature through his many years of work at the University of Vienna and the Export Academy. He doesn't seem to us to be the British type, as he is often portrayed. His affection for children is clear in his eyes and his words are kind and caring. He loves the children, they are now his world, and the children, in turn, love him, they cling to him, not just figuratively speaking, but literally like limpets when he is among them.

=== Austrian radio ===
In 1925, MacCallum was asked by a director at the Austrian national radio broadcaster RAVAG (Die Österreichische Radio-Verkehrs AG) whether he would be willing to give English lessons on the radio. At the time, radio broadcasting was still in its infancy and many scholars were afraid of using the medium for fear of being ostracized by the academic community. Rudolf Henz, who was tasked with putting together a department of academic experts for radio broadcasts in Vienna said "Even the second string were not willing to give us a line from one of their publications. One small-minded academic even said to me that if he makes himself clear and intelligible to all, then he will be a laughingstock among his colleagues." It is therefore noteworthy that MacCallum enjoyed such success teaching English on the radio and even received thousands of letters of fan mail from all over Europe.

Radio was still so new in the 1920s that after a broadcast from Austria to the United Kingdom in connection with the Schubert centenary, Professor MacCallum commented that "some doubts were expressed as to whether my voice would carry effectively to British listeners".

=== Author ===
MacCallum wrote many books that sold across Europe and was involved in the publication of two further books. Among his most notable works are The Vienna that's not in the Baedeker for which he produced the English translation, and Englisch lernen ein Vergnügen, a book to help German speakers learn English, which was first published in 1928. All of his books were educational in nature, and many were aimed at children and the young.

=== BBC ===
After returning to Britain in 1939, MacCallum worked for the BBC. For a short time, he even continued his broadcasts to his fans in Europe via the foreign radio organization.

== OBE ==
In 1938 Professor MacCallum received an OBE for his work as a radio broadcaster.

The bestowal of the O.B.E. upon Professor Thomas MacCallum for his services in fostering cultural relations between Great Britain and Austria, has given great satisfaction to his many Austrian admirers as well as the British colony in Vienna. Professor MacCallum, who is an English lecturer in Vienna, is a frequent broadcaster.

== Later life and death ==
On 3 February 1957, Professor MacCallum's wife, Emily Bertha Mayer died in Newbury at the home of his son-in-law. MacCallum continued to live with his daughter and son-in-law and their two sons, David and Thomas until his death in 1966.
