= Mary Lambie (nurse) =

New Zealand nurse and nursing educator

Mary Lambie CBE OStJ
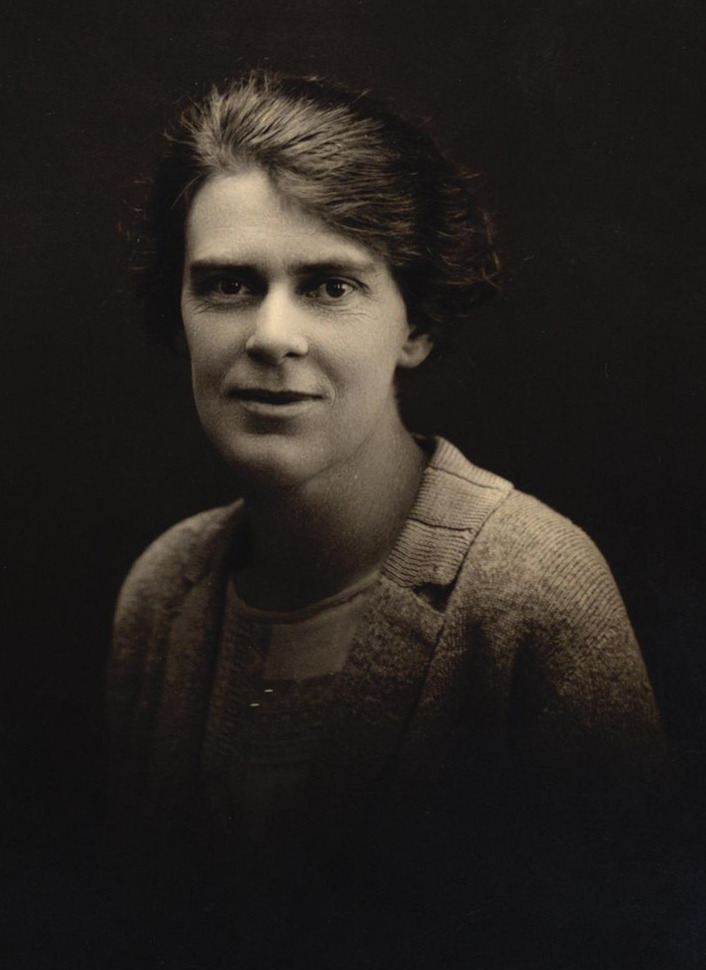
- Lambie in 1925
- Born: Mary Isabel Lambie; 26 October 1889; Christchurch, New Zealand
- Died: 22 January 1971 (aged 81); Christchurch, New Zealand
- Education: Mrs Bowen School Christchurch Girls' High School
- Employer: Limes Private Hospital Christchurch Hospital
- Known for: New Zealand nurse and nursing educator
- Parent: Margaret Sidey George Lambie

Mary Isabel Lambie CBE OStJ (26 October 1889 – 22 January 1971) was a New Zealand nurse and nursing educator. After World War II she became an international advocate for nursing and nursing education, eventually working with the World Health Organization. She also collected data on enlarged thyroids and this data led to the discovery of iodine deficiency as a cause of goitre.

== Career ==
Born in Christchurch in 1889, Lambie hoped to do medical training but family commitments prevented her from going to university, and she trained to be a nurse from 1910 to 1913 in Christchurch, with her career being cut short with the death of her mother.

In June 1918, still in the early part of her career, she was appointed a school nurse, focusing on education on the prevention of disease and illness. To complement her hospital training, she attended classes in "sanitary science" at the Christchurch Technical Institute and in child psychology at Canterbury University College.

In 1924, Lambie trained as a Plunket nurse in University of Otago. Shortly after, between 1925–26, she sailed to Canada to complete a course in public health at the University of Toronto. In 1928, she became one of two instructors for a postgraduate nursing programme in hospital administration and teaching or public health nursing. She was dedicated to improving the quality of nursing education and continued her work in the education of health professionals after the war. In 1927 she was appointed as a public health nurse in the Department of Health, becoming director of the division of nursing from 1931 until her retirement in 1950. Her work included inspecting hospitals and schools of nursing, laying the foundations of a public health nursing service as well as being concerned for the health of Māori people.

As well as supporting the work of the Maori Women's Health Leagues and reorganizing nursing services in Western Samoa and Fiji, she held a number of international positions: in 1946 she was elected president of the Florence Nightingale International Foundation; in 1947 elected first vice-president of the International Council of Nurses, a position she held until 1953; was a member of the South Pacific Board of Health from 1946 to 1949; and in 1949 she became chairperson of the Expert Nursing Advisory Committee of the World Health Organization.

In 1956 she published her autobiography My story: memoirs of a New Zealand nurse.

== Public recognition ==
In 1935, she was awarded the King George V Silver Jubilee Medal. She was appointed an Officer of the Order of St John in 1937 and an Officer of the Order of the British Empire in the 1938 New Year Honours. In the 1950 New Year Honours, she was promoted to Commander of the Order of the British Empire.
