= Kartavya Bhavan =

- कर्तव्य भवन
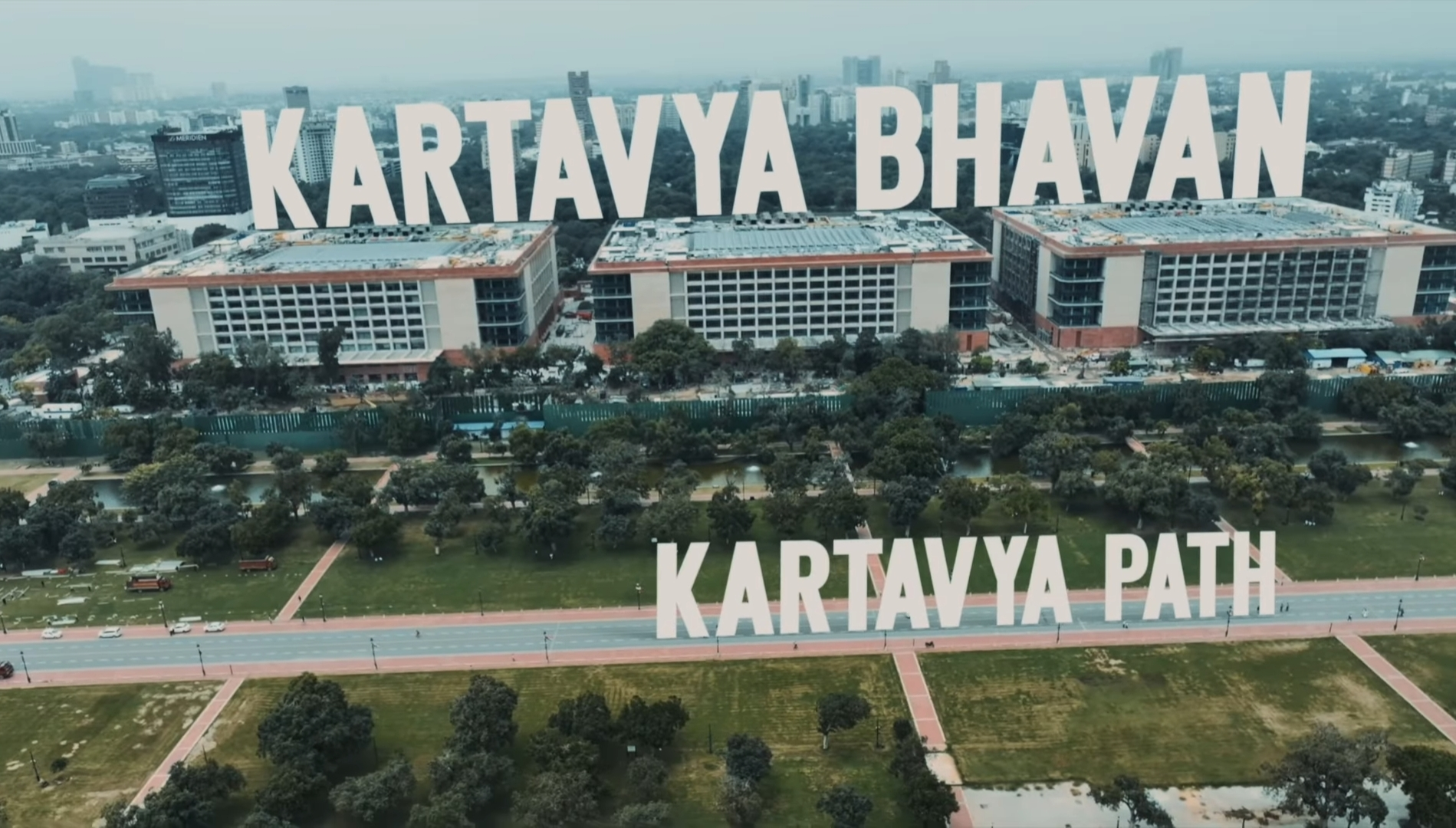
- Kartavya Bhavan-3, the first building of the Common Central Secretariat (CCS), located on Kartavya Path, New Delhi

- Location within Delhi

General information
- Status: KB-3 inaugurated on 6 August 2025
- Architectural style: Modern sustainable governance architecture
- Location: Kartavya Path, New Delhi, India
- Coordinates: 28.6142°N 77.2080°E
- Current tenants: Various Union ministries
- Construction started: 2020
- Completed: 2026
- Cost: ₹3,690 crore (US$380 million) (KB-1,2,3)
- Owner: Government of India

Technical details
- Floor count: 7 (plus 2 basements)
- Floor area: 150,000 m² (~1.5 lakh square metres)

Design and construction
- Architect: Central Public Works Department (CPWD)
- Architecture firm: HCP Design, Planning and Management Pvt. Ltd.
- Developer: Ministry of Housing and Urban Affairs
- Main contractor: Shapoorji Pallonji Group

Kartavya Bhavan, also referred to as the Common Central Secretariat (CCS), is a complex of ten new federal office buildings (three of which are currently operational) in New Delhi, India, developed under the Central Vista Redevelopment Project. Intended for usage by the various ministries of the Government of India, the project aims to replace older structures, such as Shastri Bhawan, Nirman Bhawan, and Krishi Bhawan, with a contemporaneous, centralised administrative complex.

== Development ==
Since India's independence, key ministries such as Home, Finance, Defence, External Affairs, and the Prime Minister’s Office have been housed in the North and South Block buildings, while others have occupied offices in structures like Krishi Bhawan, Shastri Bhawan, and Nirman Bhawan, which were constructed during the 1950s and 1960s. Some departments have also operated from rented premises, reportedly costing the government approximately ₹1,500 crore (US$180 million) annually in rent. The Central Vista Redevelopment Project was initiated in part to consolidate these ministries into a single complex, with the aim of improving coordination and reducing operational costs.

The Central Vista Redevelopment Project, launched in 2019, included plans to construct ten new buildings to house various central government ministries. According to official statements, the project aims to replace older government buildings that are reportedly facing issues such as insufficient space and aging infrastructure.

Kartavya Bhavan-3, the first of these ten, was completed and inaugurated on 6 August 2025. The full CCS campus is forecasted to be operational by mid-2027.

== Architecture ==
The building was designed by HCP Design, Planning and Management Pvt. Ltd., the same firm behind the overall Central Vista master plan. The structure incorporates elements of Lutyens' architectural style, such as colonnaded facades and symmetrical layouts, while integrating modern sustainability features like solar panels, rainwater harvesting, and energy-efficient HVAC systems.

The seven-storey structure, with two subterranean levels, spans approximately 150,000 m^{2} (1,600,000 ft^{2}). The design includes features intended to improve energy efficiency and reduce environmental impact. Key elements include:

- Double-glazed facade and noise-insulating glass.
- Energy-saving LED lights, sensor-based and smart HVAC systems, reducing consumption by ~30%.
- Rooftop solar panels (366 kWp + 200 kW) generating over 534,000 kWh annually.
- Aiming for GRIHA-4 green rating.
- Zero-discharge wastewater management (1.1 million L/day recycled), rainwater harvesting, and composting (~1,000 kg/day).
- Recycled materials, EV charging infrastructure, smart elevators, and motion-sensor lighting.

=== Facilities ===
Each of the buildings includes 24 large conference rooms, 26 small ones, and 67 compact team-meeting spaces, along with facilities such as a crèche, yoga room, medical center, café, multipurpose hall, and parking for about 600 cars. Entry is controlled via smart ID cards, biometric systems, and a centralized surveillance control centre.

== Buildings and ministries ==
Kartavya Bhavan 3 under construction in March 2024

A total of ten Common Central Secretariat buildings will be built along the Kartavya Path to house all the ministries and important departments. Some old ministerial buildings like Krishi Bhawan, Nirman Bhawan, Shastri Bhawan, Udyog Bhawan, and Vigyan Bhavan will be demolished to make way for these new buildings. Udyog Bhawan and Nirman Bhawan were eventually demolished in mid-2026. The occupants of Krishi Bhawan and Shastri Bhawan have been asked by the Central Public Works Department to vacate the structures by September 2026, paving the way for their demolition.

Kartavya Bhavan-3, the first among the ten buildings, was inaugurated on 5 August 2025. Kartavya Bhavan 1 and 2, along with Seva Teerth were inaugurated on 13 February 2026. The rest of the buildings are expected to be completed by June 2027.

=== Kartavy Bhavan 1 ===
It is located on the northern side of Kartavya Path: its eastern section straddles Man Singh Road, whereas its northern peripheries is adjacent to Dr. Rajendra Prasad Road. This building houses:

- Ministry of Finance
  - Department of Expenditure (6th floor)
  - Department of Economic Affairs (5th & 6th floor)
  - Department of Revenue (4th floor)

=== Kartavy Bhavan 2 ===
This structure is located between buildings 1 and 3. It is only connected by Dr. Rajendra Prasad Road, running across its northern section. The building houses:

- Central Bureau of Investigation — Ground–1st floor
- Ministry of Education — Ground-2nd floor
- Chemicals and Fertilizers — 2nd floor
- Culture — 2nd floor
- Information and Broadcasting — 2nd–3rd floor
- Agriculture and Farmers' Welfare — 3rd floor
- Law and Justice — 3rd–4th floor
- Defence — 5th–6th floor

=== Kartavy Bhavan 3 ===
This building’s western section faces Janpath, and Dr. Rajendra Prasad Road to the north. The building houses:

- Petroleum and Natural Gas — Ground–1st floor
- Personnel & Training — UG–1st floor
- Micro, Small & Medium Enterprises — 2nd floor
- Rural Development — 2nd floor
- Principal Scientific Adviser — 3rd floor
- External Affairs — 3rd floor
- Home Affairs — 4th–6th floor

== Connectivity ==
Kartavya Bhavan is accessible via major arterial roads including Rafi Marg, Rajendra Prasad Road, Janpath Road, and Mann Singh Road, and is in close proximity to the Central Secretariat metro station on the Yellow Line and Violet Line of Delhi Metro.

At the onset, a plan was proposed to install a loop-line of underground moving walkways connecting all buildings of the Common Central Secretariat. However, the proposal was eventually dropped.

During the inauguration of Kartavya Bhavan-3, the government announced a new 7-kilometre extension of the Delhi Metro’s Magenta Line, running from Indraprastha metro station to Ramakrishna Ashram Marg. The extension will include nine new stations at Bharat Mandapam, Baroda House, India Gate, Kartavya Bhavan, Central Secretariat, Yuge Yugeen Bharat Museum, and Shivaji Stadium.

== See also ==
- Kartavya Path
- Secretariat Building, New Delhi
- Rashtrapati Bhavan
- Prime Minister's Office (India)
