= Shramew Jayate Yojana =

Prime Minister Narendra Modi launched the Pandit Deendayal Upadhyay Shramev Jayate scheme on 16 October 2014 at a function held at Vigyan Bhawan in Delhi. The main objective of this scheme is to improve the labour laws and improve the labour process. On this occasion, the Prime Minister also started the 'Shram Suvidha' portal for employees and a new 'Labour Inspection Scheme'. Information related to all labour laws will be given on 'Shram Suvidha' portal. The Prime Minister also launched the 'Pandit Deendayal Upadhyay Shramev Jayate' scheme, as well as the 'Shram Suvidha' portal, Shram Vigyan program and a uniform account scheme for the employees who are depositing provident funds. In addition, he released a souvenir of the winners of the All India Skill Development Competition and a handbook of brand ambassadors of vocational training. The Apprentice Incentive Scheme was also launched on this occasion.

== Key facts related to Shram Suvidha Portal ==
There are a total of 44 labour laws in the country of which 16 are under the purview of the central government. Information about all these laws will be given on 'Shram Suvidha Portal' and entrepreneurs will also be able to register online. Workers will also be given an ID number. Along with this, the National Health Insurance Scheme for the unorganized sector workers will be strengthened under this scheme and they will be provided with a smart card.
