= Central Vista Redevelopment Project =

Project to revamp India's administrative capital

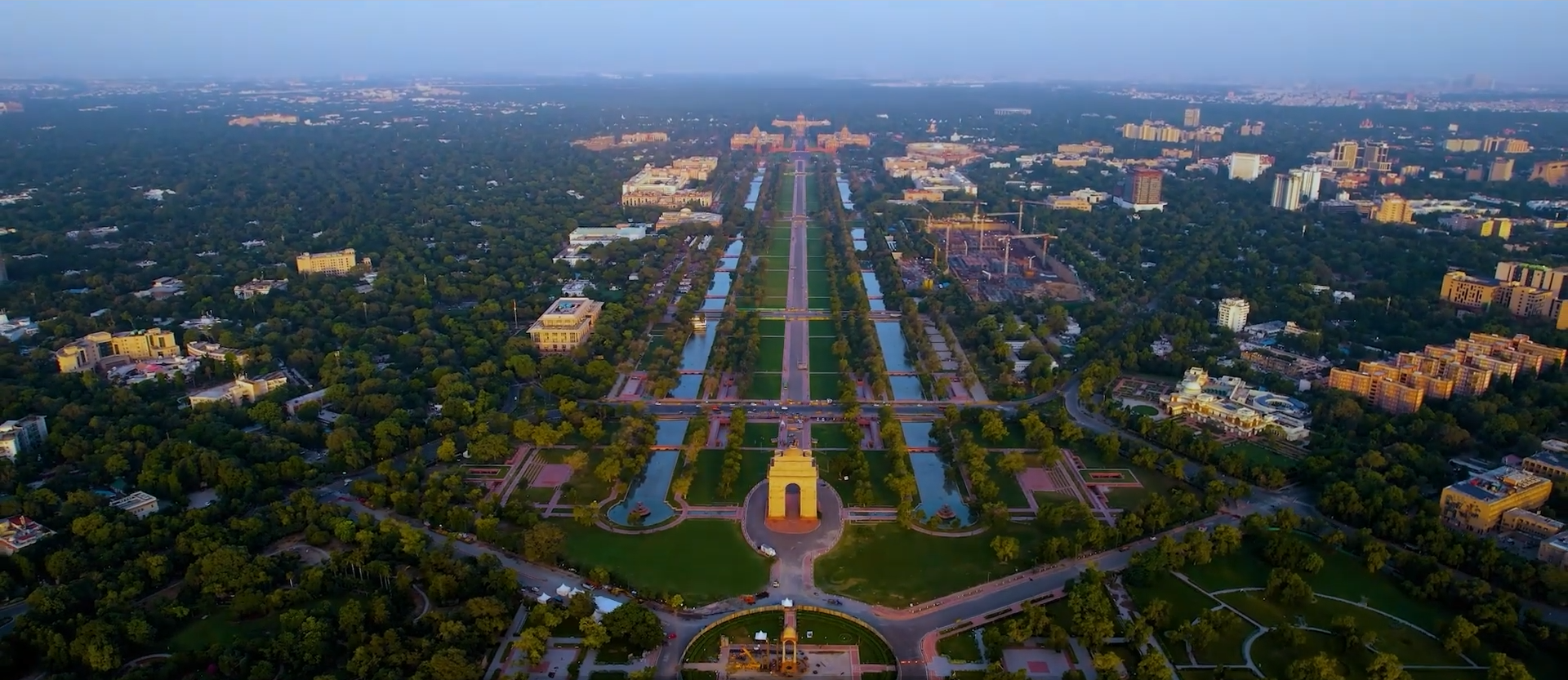
- Aerial view of redeveloped Rajpath in Delhi
- Location: Raisina Hill, New Delhi, Delhi, India
- Proposer: Ministry of Housing and Urban Affairs, Government of India
- Project website: www.centralvista.gov.in
- Status: Under construction
- Type: Reconstruction and renovation of administrative buildings
- Cost estimate: ₹20,000 crore (US$2.1 billion)
- Start date: September 2019
- Completion date: 2028 (expected)

Central Vista Redevelopment Project is the ongoing redevelopment of the Central Vista, India's central administrative area located near Raisina Hill, New Delhi. Designed and constructed by Edwin Lutyens and Herbert Baker during British rule as the seat of the imperial government, the area was retained by the Government of India following independence.

Scheduled for completion between 2020 and 2028, the project seeks to transform the 3 km (1.9 mi) stretch of Rajpath spanning from Rashtrapati Bhavan to India Gate into a modern, pedestrian-friendly boulevard. Key components include the construction of a new Parliament building with increased seating capacity, a new Central Secretariat to house all ministries, and new official residences and offices for the Prime Minister and Vice President near the North and South Blocks. The existing North and South Blocks will be converted into publicly accessible museums, along with the adaptive reuse of other historic structures.

The redevelopment project is estimated to cost around ₹13,450 crore (approximately ₹160 billion or US$1.9 billion as of 2023), with expenses spread over a four-year period.

The ratification of the project invited scathing scrutiny, criticism, and public outcry, particularly against the backdrop of the Covid-19 pandemic when the project was initiated, and the impact on numerous heritage structures, many of which have either been demolished or scheduled for demolition. Critics underscored the burgeoning cost of the project (equivalent to 1% of the relief package announced during the pandemic) as tone-deaf, especially against the backdrop of spiralling economic uncertainty. This was compounded by the proposed demolition of several historically significant structures to make way for the redevelopment, which many viewed as emblematic of the Government of India’s misplaced priorities. Moreover, as the second wave of the pandemic ravaged India in 2021—prompting a stringent lockdown to curb the virus’s spread—the project was controversially designated an "essential service": while all other construction activities in Delhi in the National Capital Region came to a screeching halt, work on the redevelopment continued unabated.

The project proceeded with limited public consultation on land use changes, incomplete disclosure of heritage review processes, and key approvals, such as for the new Parliament building, granted during lockdown meetings where non-governmental members were reportedly unable to attend. While the government justified the urgent commencement of the project citing the dilapidated condition of several ministry buildings, the absence of opportunities for public consultation, expert input, and adherence to established heritage bylaws generated considerable criticism from the public, conservationists, and opposition parties alike.

== Background ==
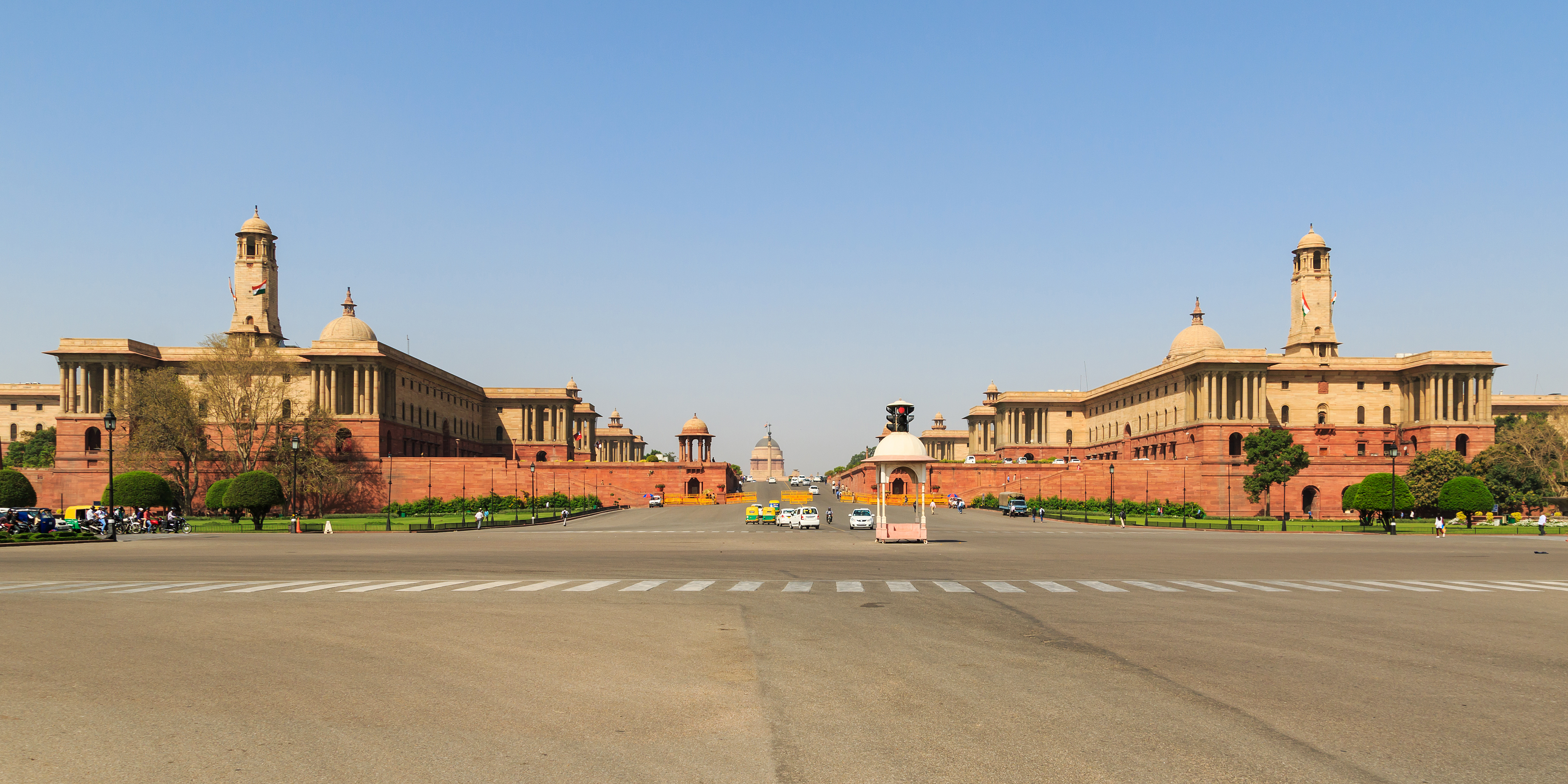
Ensemble of government buildings on Kartavya Path, New Delhi in 2016

Following the coronation of King George V at the Delhi Durbar in 1911 and his proclamation to shift the imperial capital from Calcutta to Delhi, the Central Vista was designed by architects Edwin Lutyens and Herbert Baker. The Parliament building alone took six years to construct, from laying the foundation stone on 12 February 1921 to the inauguration by then Viceroy Lord Irwin on 18 January 1927. After independence in 1947, it became the seat of the government of the new republic. The parliament campus was declared a heritage precinct in the 1962 Master plan of Delhi.

The government statement for the new Vista development project stated “As the needs and duties of the government expanded, so did the usage of the space. However, due to the development in the area being around a century old, and the current growth and development of India, the current Central Vista has failed to keep up with the needs of the country”.

The Central Vista Redevelopment Project was launched in 2019. The project includes converting North and South Blocks into public museums, creating an ensemble of new secretariat buildings to house all ministries, relocating the Vice President and the Prime Minister's offices and residences near the North and South Blocks, and revamping the 3 km (1.9 mi) long Rajpath between Rashtrapati Bhavan and India Gate. A new parliament building with increased seating capacity will be built beside the older one as India aims to expand its parliamentary membership in 2026. The project aims for completion in 2026. This plan did not include the proposed Prime Minister's Office (PMO) as there were issues of pending land-use change and litigation. The construction of the new Parliament building was temporarily put on hold by the Supreme Court of India but was released again within few days with some riders.

== Tender notice ==
The criteria for the competition were set by the Council of Architecture, which included no building being taller than India Gate. The project proponent or client had to seek conceptual approval from the Delhi Urban Arts Commission (DUAC). Financial decisions received clearance from the Central Vigilance Commission. Monetary allocation was provided from the Finance Ministry. Project assessment studies were done by the New Delhi Municipal Corporation (NDMC). The regulatory master plan was done by the Central Public Works Department (CPWD). A Notice Inviting Tender (NIT) was held. The bidding was held in two rounds. In the first round, merit was given on possibilities and innovation. In the second round, the winner was decided based on their capacity to deliver results. The winner was decided by a jury.

There were six bidders in the final competition, who presented their proposal to the Central Public Works Department (CPWD), Government of India.

The design contract was won by Bimal Patel led HCP Design Planning and Management Pvt. Ltd. of Ahmedabad, Gujarat in October 2019.

== Plan for redevelopment ==
The project is expected to cost around ₹13,000 crore (equivalent to ₹160 billion or US$1.7 billion in 2026) over several years and to be fully completed by 2026.

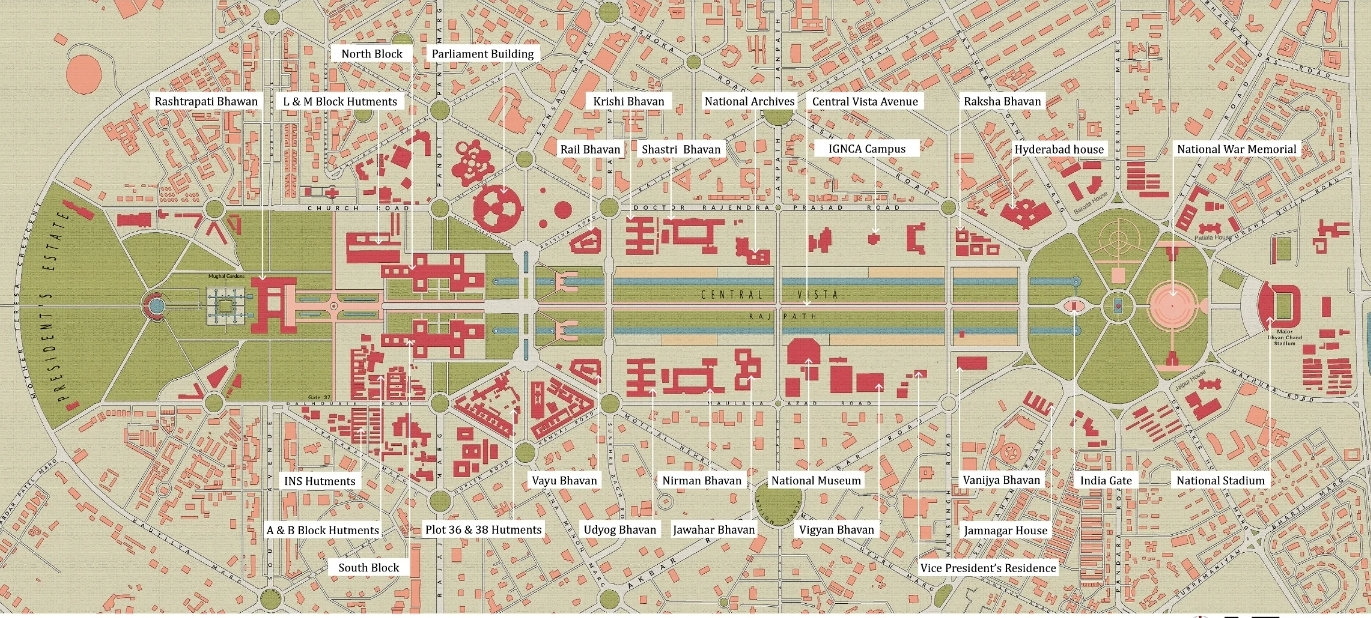
Present Masterplan of Central Vista

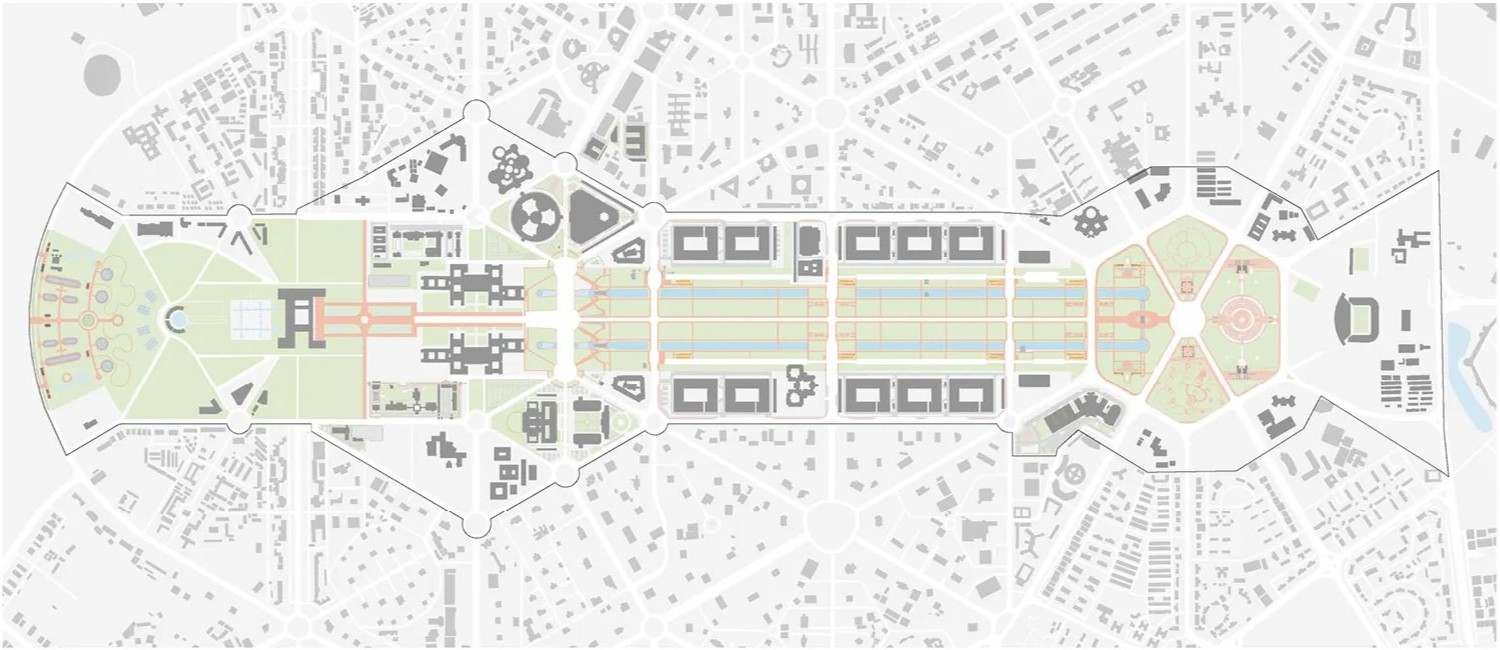
Proposed Masterplan for Central Vista

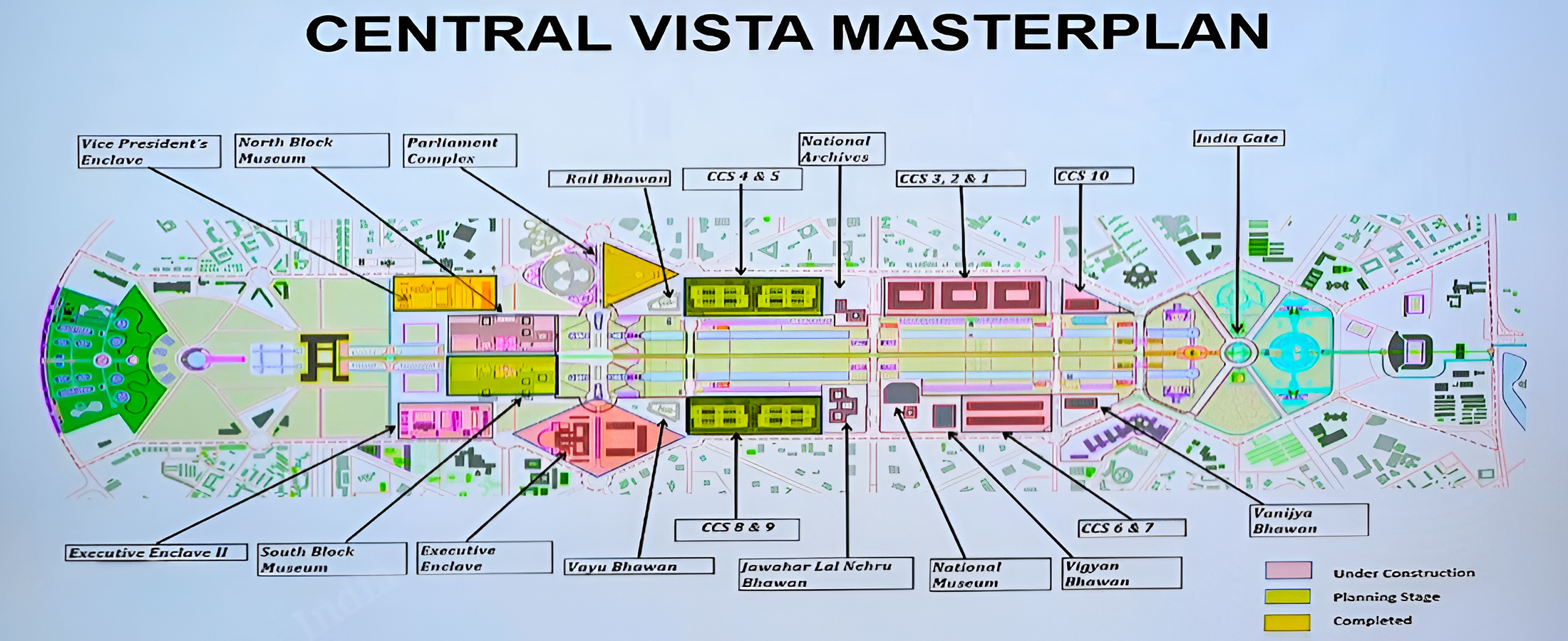
New Central Vista Masterplan

Central Vista redevelopment project
New structures	Structures to be repurposed	Structures to be retained as it is	Structures to be demolished
New Parliament House; Kartavya Path (Rajpath); Vice President's Enclave; Prime Minister's Enclave; Kartavya Bhavan; Executive Enclave; Cabinet Secretariat; National Security Council; Prime Minister's Office; India House; Vanijya Bhawan; New facilities for IGNCA	Old Parliament House; North and South Block; Presidential Gardens	Rashtrapati Bhavan; India Gate; National War Memorial; Rail Bhawan; Vayu Bhawan; Jawahar Lal Nehru Bhawan; National Museum; Vigyan Bhawan Main Building; National Archives	Indira Gandhi National Centre for the Arts; Vice President's House; Shastri Bhawan; Krishi Bhawan; Nirman Bhawan; Udyog Bhawan; Raksha Bhawan; Transport Bhawan; Shram Shakti Bhawan; Vigyan Bhawan Annexe building

=== New Parliament House ===
A new triangular-shaped building to house the Parliament of India was built beside the existing structure as the first building under the project. The new structure is spread over 20,866 metres (68,458 ft) and has a built-up area of 694,270 sq ft (64,500 m^{2}) throughout four floors (16,125 m^{2} (173,570 sq ft) each floor). The new parliament building has a larger seating capacity than the current building. The new Rajya Sabha hall has a capacity of 384 seats while the new Lok Sabha hall has 888 seats, with additional capacity up to 1272 seats for hosting joint sessions. It has digital interface systems and will consume significantly less power. The government claims it will last 150 years while the older structure will be transformed and refurbished to house a museum. Tata Projects won the bid to construct the building at a cost of ₹861.90 crores (₹8619 million) in September 2020 and began construction in January 2021. It was inaugurated on 28 May 2023.

=== Kartavya Path ===
Under this project, the 3 km (1.9 mi) long Rajpath (renamed to Kartavya Path by the BJP-led central government) was refurbished and redeveloped with construction of new bridges over the canals straddling its peripheries, pedestrian underpasses, wide footpaths, new parking lots, more green areas, and installation of benches as well as trees. Shapoorji Pallonji was awarded the tender for the redevelopment of the Central Vista Avenue in January 2021. They were required to complete the project within 300 days and maintain it for five years post-completion. The revamped avenue was inaugurated on 8 September 2022.

=== Common Central Secretariat ===
A set of ten doughnut-shaped buildings on four plots, comprising a unified Central Secretariat, will be built on either sides of the Kartavya Path. The height of all the buildings will be lower than 42 meters (height of India Gate), and each shall have 7 floors. The exteriors of all buildings will be similar to that of the surrounding buildings conforming to the Lutyens' style. An extension of the Delhi Metro via the Green Line will provide connectivity to the Common Central Secretariat.

The existing Secretariat Building houses 22 ministries with 41,000 employees, whereas the rest are spread across New Delhi. The new facility itself will house all the 51 ministries.

=== New office and residence for the Vice President and the Prime Minister ===
The residence of the Vice President will be relocated to a plot north of the North Block, while the residence and office of the Prime Minister will be moved to a plot south of the South Block. Bringing them both within the Central Vista will cut down on travel time and decrease traffic snarls caused by the movement of ministers and high-ranking government functionaries, which entails road blockades and inconvenience to the public.

The Vice President's enclave will be on a site of 15 acres, with 32 five-storey buildings at a maximum height of 15 meters. The new office and residence of the Prime Minister shall be housed on a site of 15 acres, with 10 four-storey buildings at a maximum height of 12 meters. A dedicated building has been earmarked for the Special Protection Group.

=== Indira Gandhi National Centre for Arts ===
The Indira Gandhi National Centre for the Arts (IGNCA) will be relocated from its current home on Man Singh Road, and its role as a cultural space will be expanded. A 15-acre plot near Jamnagar House has been identified to relocate the present building. The new building will retain IGNCA's existing role as a centre for research, publication, events and training while allowing additional facilities to be added.

=== Central Vista Metro Loop Line ===
The Central Vista Loop Line, as part of the Central Vista Redevelopment Project, shall constitute an underground line of the Delhi Metro with 4 stations, including the existing Central Secretariat metro station interchange of the existing Yellow and Violet lines. This loop line will connect the new government buildings comprising the project.

== Reception ==
Architect Bimal Patel claims the project is a triumph of "common sense" with a simple and functional design. He has also stated that the existing listed heritage buildings will be integrated into the project, with any new buildings to be "aesthetically harmonious" with existing buildings.

The project was criticised for being built at a time when India was facing an unprecedented crisis due to Covid-19, with casualties soaring exponentially owing to shortage of key medical supplies and inadequate personnel.

43% of the trees transplanted to make way for the structures and buildings of the Central Vista Redevelopment Project died, per the revelations of the Union Minister of State for Housing and Urban Affairs Tokhan Sahu in April 2026.

== Approvals ==
The project construction requires approval from the local body, which is New Delhi Municipal Council (NDMC) in this case. The NDMC was bypassed for the redevelopment project as that would require project to be adhered to municipal building laws. NDMC was replaced by Central Public Works Department (CPWD). A colonial law (The Government Building Act, 1899) was activated to empower CPWD. This law gives central government power to build anywhere without approval of the urban local body. Other bodies like Delhi Urban Art Commission (DUAC) were notified to treat CPWD as local body. As the CPWD was empowered, no technical drawings for any part of the project were sent to other authorities for approval including the independent environmental impact assessment as the project did not require clearance for environment, as mandated by Environment Ministry's 2006 notification on Environmental Impact Assessment (EIA).

== See also ==
- Architecture of India
- Bimal Patel
- Raisina Hill
- Lutyens' Delhi
