= Yuge Yugeen Bharat =

Museum in Delhi, India

Yuge Yugeen Bharat is an under-construction museum in New Delhi, India, which will be the largest museum in the world, with an area of 155,000 square meters and 950 rooms. It will be housed in the existing Secretariat buildings, both north and South blocks and replace the National Museum of India as national museum.
