= Vigyan Bhawan =

Building in India

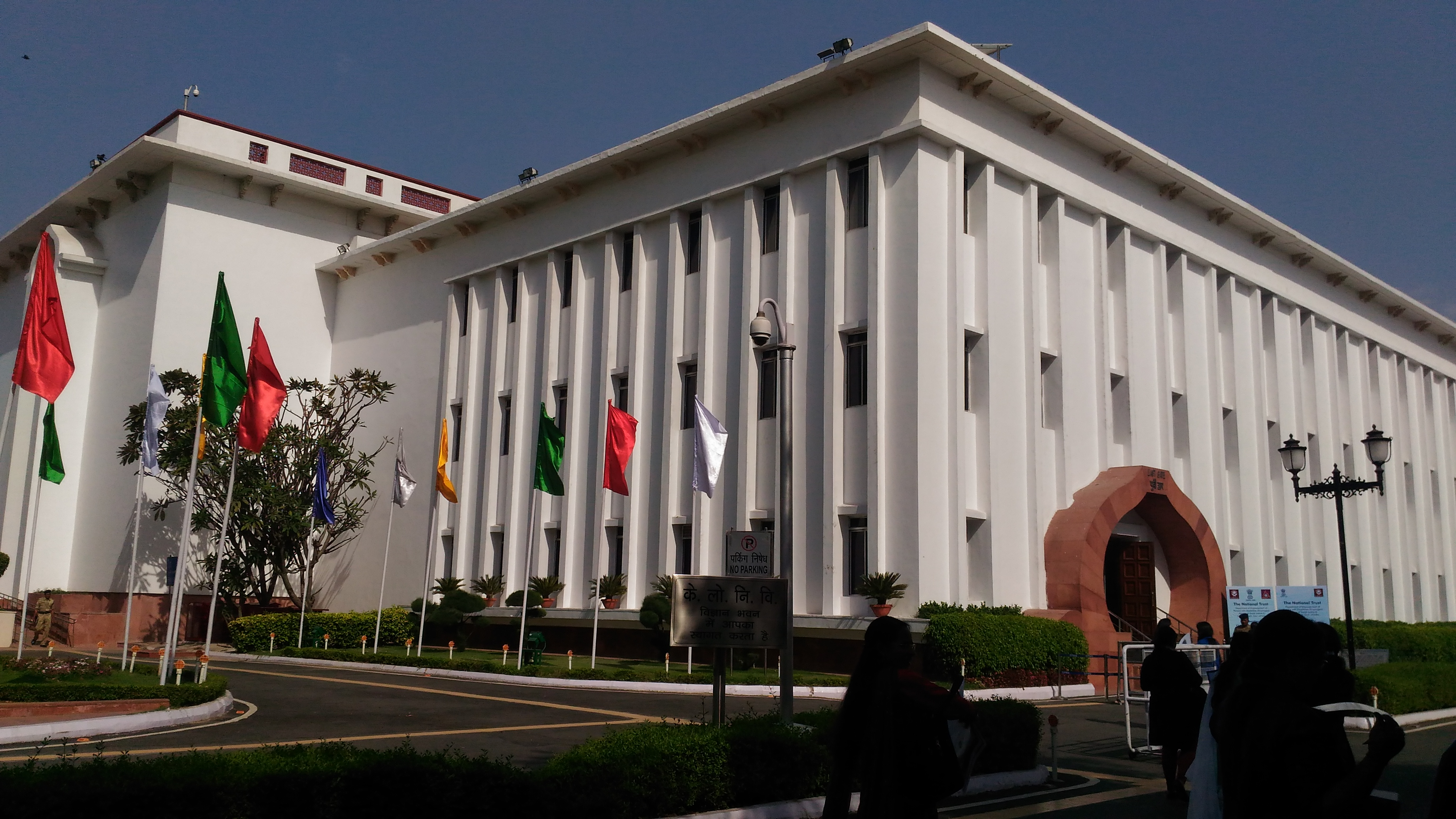
- Main entrance to the Vigyan Bhawan
- Interactive map of Vigyan Bhawan
- Address: Maulana Azad Road, New Delhi-110003, India
- Location: New Delhi
- Coordinates: 28°36′37.49″N 77°13′14.93″E
- Owner: Ministry of Urban Development, Government of India
- Operator: ITDC, Govt. of India

Construction
- Built: 1956

Website
- itdc.co.in/vigyan-bhawan/

Vigyan Bhawan (lit. "science building") is a premier conference centre of the Government of India in New Delhi. Built in 1956, over the years it has been the venue of conferences of national and international stature, seminars and award ceremonies attended by distinguished world leaders and dignitaries, including Commonwealth Heads of Government Meeting (CHOGM) in 1983, 7th Summit of the Non-Aligned Movement (NAM), 7–12 March 1983, and SAARC Summit. It is managed by the Directorate of Estates, under the Ministry of Urban Development, Government of India, and maintained by CPWD.

It only holds National-level functions and conferences, and functions by the Government of India, State Governments, PSUs and Autonomous Bodies order by priority given. It is allotted to NGOs/Private Enterprises where either the President, Vice President or the Prime Minister of India are present. It also holds various award ceremonies, including the annual National Film Awards.

== Architecture ==
The main building was designed in 1955 by R.P. Gehlote of Central Public Works Department (CPWD) belonging to Jaipur, incorporating elements of British Raj architecture, evident in the nearby buildings of the Secretariat Building and of Lutyens' Delhi along with Hindu and Mughal architecture, as well as ancient Buddhist architecture, especially the chaitya arches of Ajanta Caves. The overall style of the building remains modernistic with revivalist elements.

== Overview ==
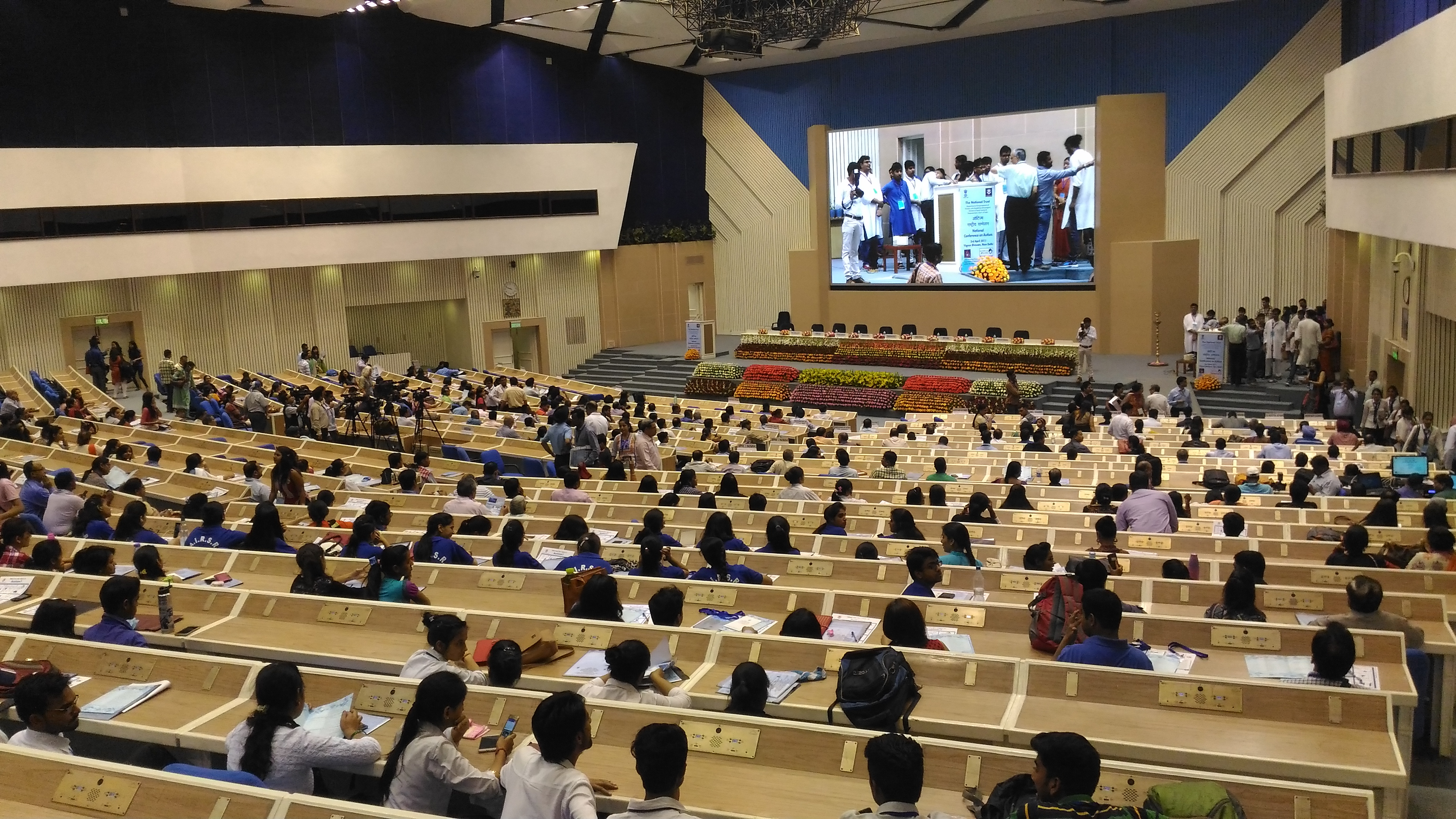
Plenary hall of Vigyan Bhawan

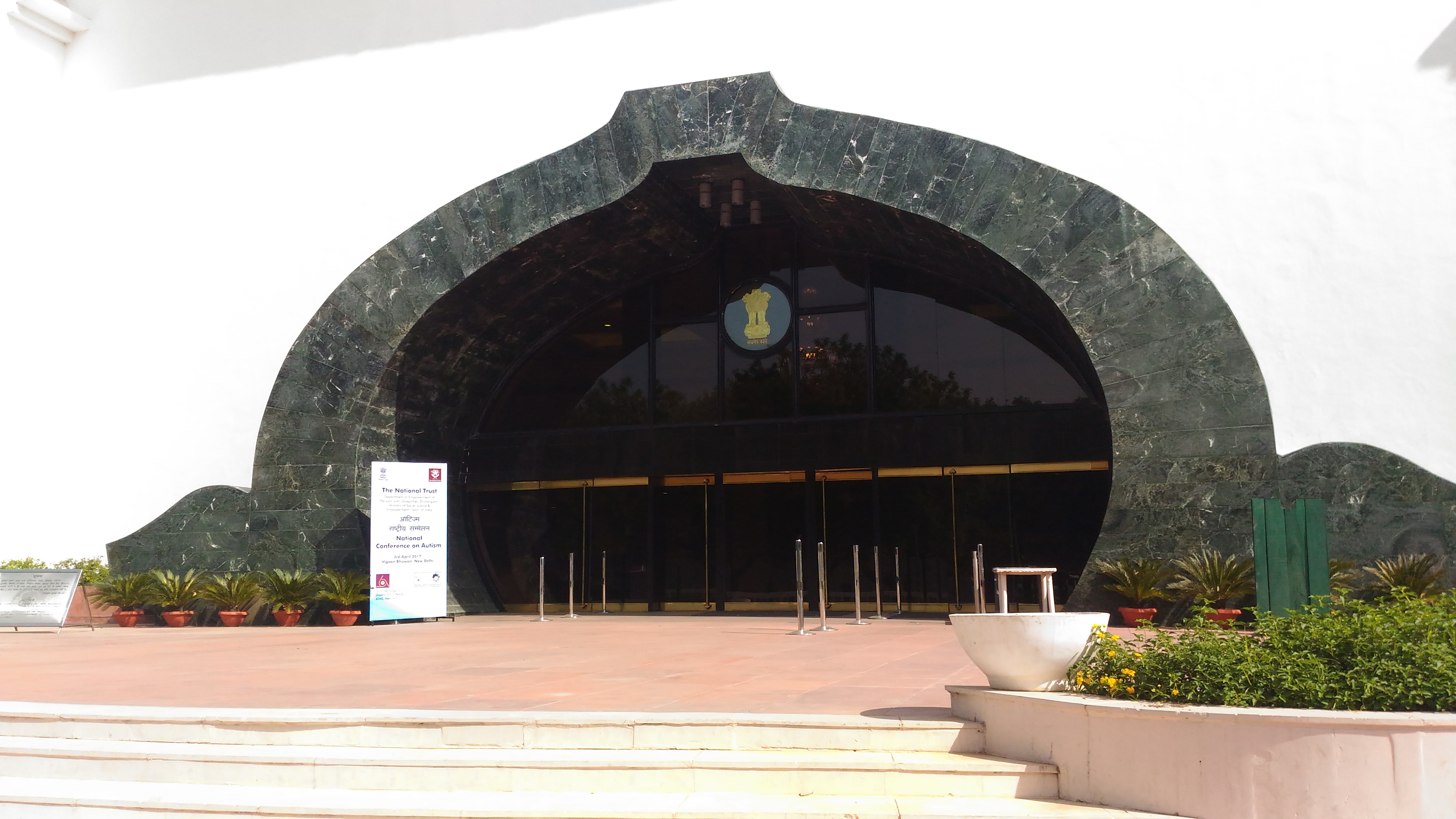
Main gate of Vigyan Bhawan with the chaitya arches, inspired by Ajanta Caves.

The main feature of the complex is the Plenary hall, with a seating capacity of over 1200(922+326+37) delegates, besides it has six smaller halls with capacities ranging from over 65 delegates to over 375 delegates. The building also has a VIP Lounge, the Office block for on-site offices, secretariat and a documentation centre, a Studio, a Business centre and an Exhibition hall. The adjacent building is called the Vigyan Bhavan Annexe added later on with four Committee Rooms and a separate Media centre. The annexe also houses the Ministry of Development of North Eastern Region (MDoNER) of Government of India and INVEST INDIA, the National Investment Promotion and Facilitation Agency. The Vigyan Bhawan Annexe stands adjacent to the Vice President House.

F&B services at 'The Atrium' at the centre are managed by the Ashok Group of the India Tourism Development Corporation (ITDC).

As a part of Central Vista Redevelopment Project, Vigyan Bhavan Annexe will be demolished but main building will be restored as it is due to its historic legacy.

== Important Events Hosted ==
- 7th Summit of the Non-Aligned Movement
- 1983 Commonwealth Heads of Government Meeting

== See also ==
- Bharat Mandapam
- Yashobhoomi
- Siri Fort Auditorium
