= Rajpath =

Boulevard in New Delhi stretching from India Gate to Rashtrapati Bhavan

Coordinates: 28.613388°N 77.218397°E

- Kartavya Path
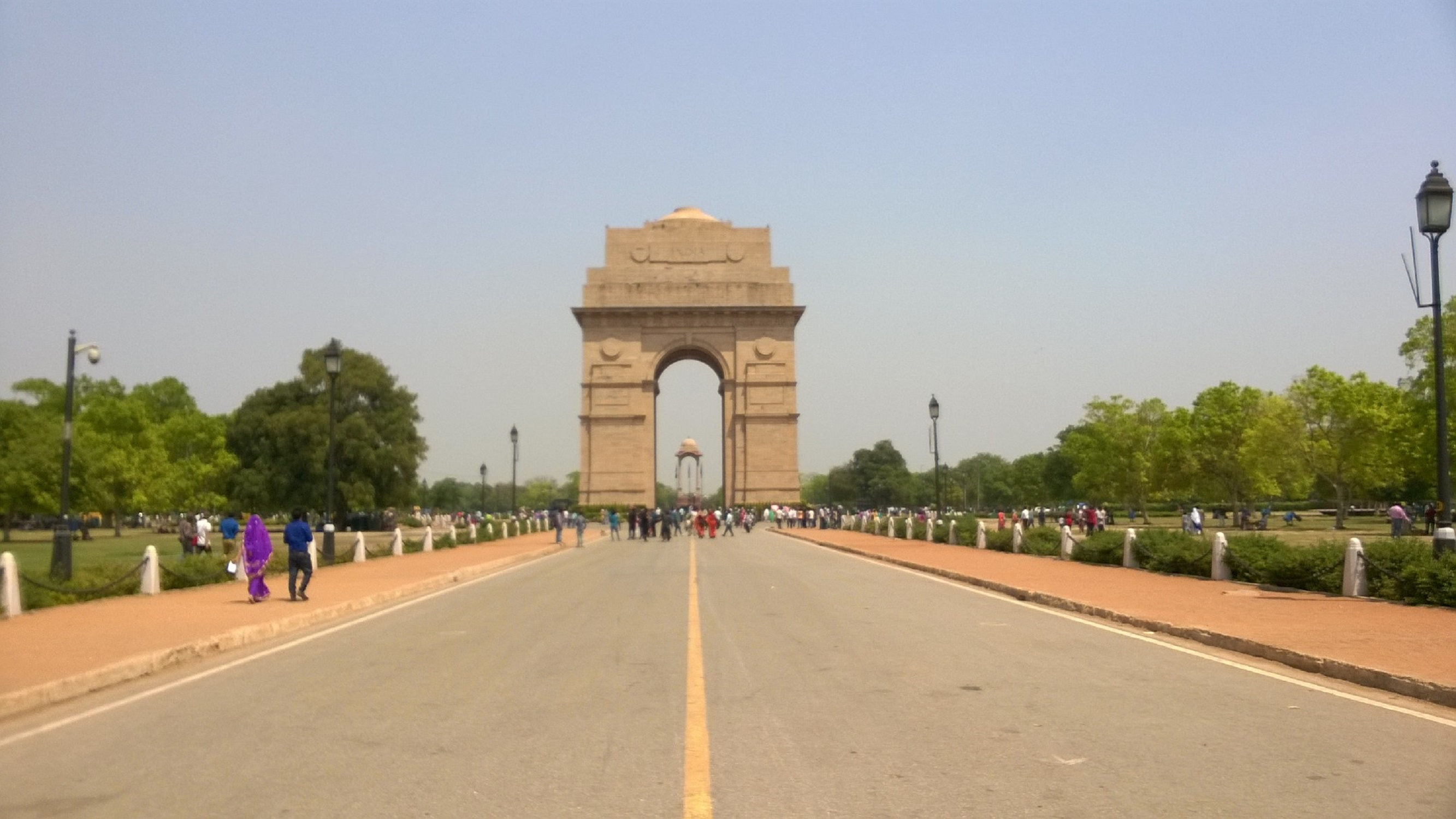
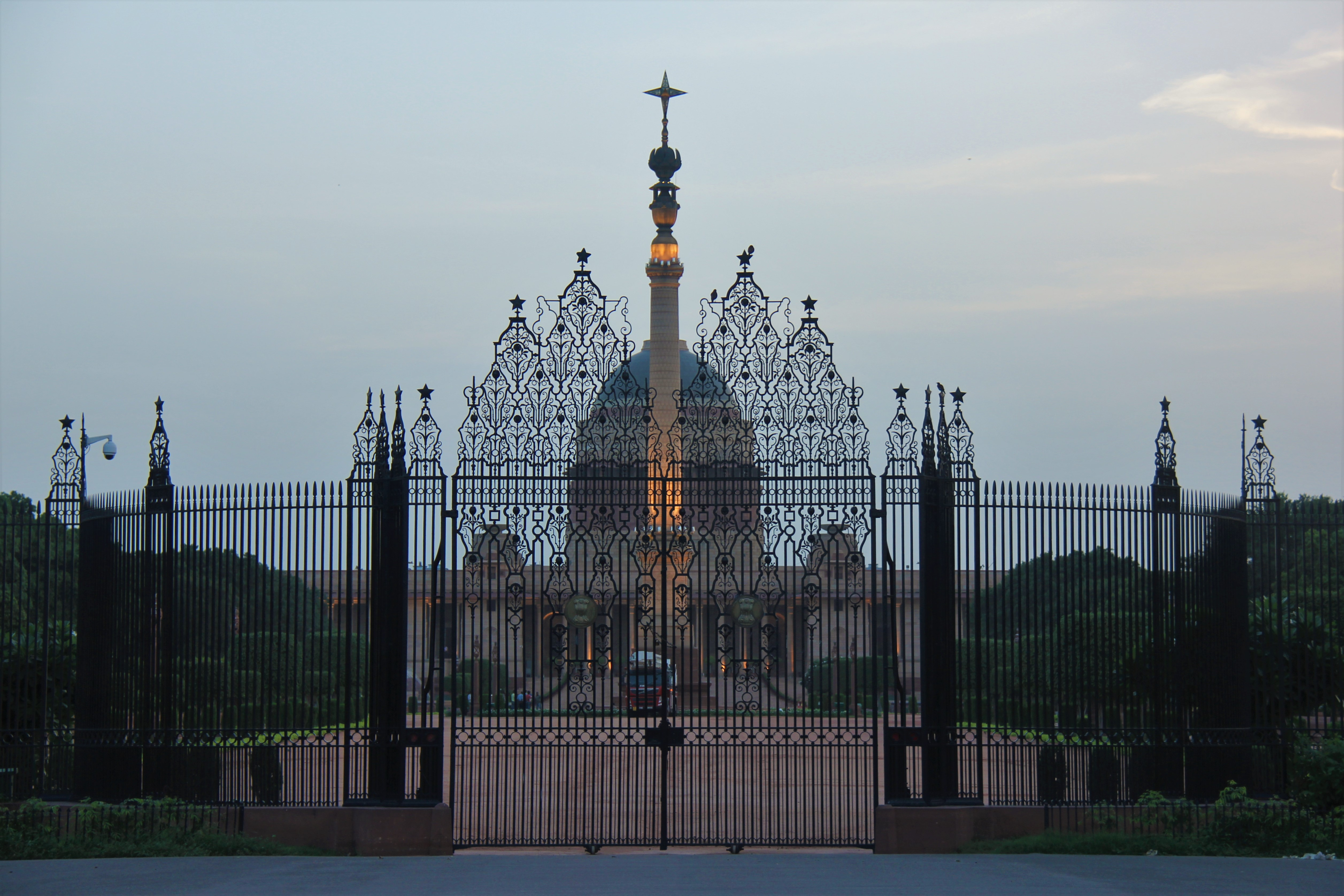
- From top: India Gate on the eastern end of Rajpath; Rashtrapati Bhavan on the western end of Rajpath
- Rajpath, located in New Delhi, India
- Former name: Kingsway
- Location: New Delhi, India
- Nearest metro station: Central Secretariat metro station

Construction
- Inauguration: 1911

Other
- Designer: Sir Edwin Lutyens
- Status: Heritage status

Rajpath (transl. Kingsway), officially named Kartavya Path (transl. Path of Duty), and formerly known as Kingsway, is a ceremonial boulevard in New Delhi, India, that runs from Rashtrapati Bhavan on Raisina Hill through Vijay Chowk and India Gate, National War Memorial to National Stadium, Delhi. The avenue is lined on both sides by huge lawns, canals and rows of trees. Considered to be one of the most important roads in India, it is where the annual Republic Day parade takes place on 26 January. Janpath (meaning "People's Way") crosses the road. Rajpath runs in east-west direction. Roads from Connaught Place, the financial centre of Delhi, run into Rajpath from north. It was made during the construction of New Delhi.

After climbing Raisina Hill, Rajpath is flanked by the North and South Blocks of the Secretariat Building. Finally it ends at the gates of Rashtrapati Bhavan. At Vijay Chowk it crosses Sansad Marg, and the Parliament House of India can be seen to the right when coming from the India Gate.

It is also used for the funeral processions of key political leaders of India.

== Name and history ==
In 1911 the British Imperial Government and the Viceregal administration determined that the capital of the British Indian Empire should be moved from Calcutta to Delhi. Accordingly, construction in that year began on the district of New Delhi, which would serve as the purpose-built administrative capital of the Indian Empire. The British Raj duly turned to Sir Edwin Lutyens to construct the new city. Lutyens conceived of a modern imperial city centred around a "ceremonial axis", such axis being the large boulevard now called the Rajpath. Lutyens wanted a panoramic view of the city of Delhi from the viceregal palace. Consequently, the view from Raisina Hill runs unhindered across Rajpath and the India Gate, and is obstructed only by the National Stadium.

Most of the buildings surrounding the Rajpath were designed by Lutyens and the second architect of the project, Sir Herbert Baker and contracted by Sir Sobha Singh. The key function of such buildings in the government of India ensures the road's importance. The first project was done in 1911 under Sujan Singh Hadaliwale, the Vijay Chowk, but it then halted due to the onset of the First World War.

=== Name ===
When built, the road was named King's Way, or Kingsway, in honour of the Emperor of India George V, who had visited Delhi during the Durbar of 1911, and where the Emperor formally proclaimed the decision to move the capital. The name was similar to Kingsway in London, which had been opened in 1905, and which was also a custom-built arterial road, and which had been named in honour of George V's father, Edward VII (as King of the United Kingdom).

Following the Independence of India the road was given its Hindi name, 'Rajpath', in place of its English designation. This represented a mere translation more than a substantial renaming, since 'Rajpath' in Hindi is broadly analogous in meaning to 'King's Way'.

In September 2022, Rajpath was redeveloped under Central Vista Redevelopment Project and renamed Kartavya Path.

== Landmarks ==
- The Rashtrapati Bhavan, the official residence of the President of India. It was the viceroy's residence before Indian independence.
- North Block and South Block, also called the Secretariat Building. North Block houses the offices of Finance and Home ministries. South Block hosts External affairs and Defense ministries. Other important offices like some of the Prime Ministers Offices are also in the Secretariat Buildings.
- Vijay Chowk is a spacious plaza and the site of Beating the Retreat ceremony, which takes place on 29 January each year, which marks the end of Republic Day celebrations, in which Military Bands, Pipes and Drums Bands, Buglers and Trumpeters from various Army Regiments besides bands of the Navy and Air Force take part, with the President of India as the Chief Guest.
- India Gate is India's war memorial arch in honour of those who died in the First World War and the Second Anglo-Afghan War. It is also India's memorial of the unknown soldier.
- National War Memorial, built to honour and remember soldiers of the Indian military who fought in armed conflicts of independent India. Since Independence, more than 25,000 soldiers of the Indian Armed Forces have been killed in various conflicts, humanitarian assistance and disaster response operations.

== Redevelopment ==
The Central Vista Redevelopment Project started construction on 4 February 2021 and is planned to be finished in 2026 in phases.

On 8 September 2022, the redeveloped Boulevard was inaugurated by Prime Minister Narendra Modi. A number of new features like planned landscapes, lawns with walkways, green spaces, refurbished canals, amenity blocks, improved signages and vending kiosks, new pedestrian underpasses, improved parking spaces, new exhibition panels, and upgraded night lighting were added.

New sustainability features like solid waste management, storm-water management, recycling unit, rainwater harvesting, water conservation and energy efficient lighting systems were implemented. Foldable seats were added for the annual Republic Day parade.

== Gallery ==
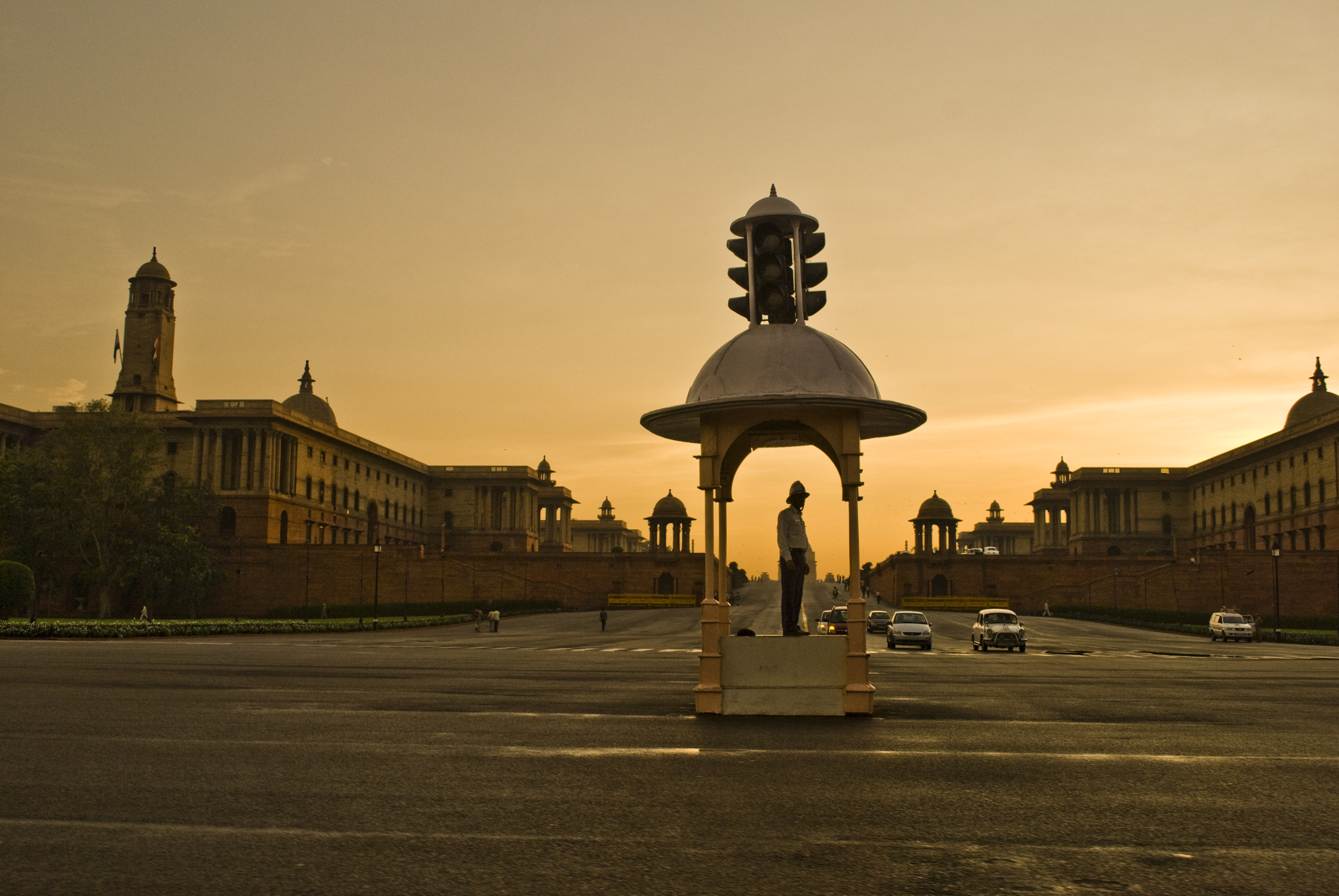
Vijay Chowk at Rajpath, with Secretariat Building in the background, New Delhi, the venue of the Beat Retreat ceremony

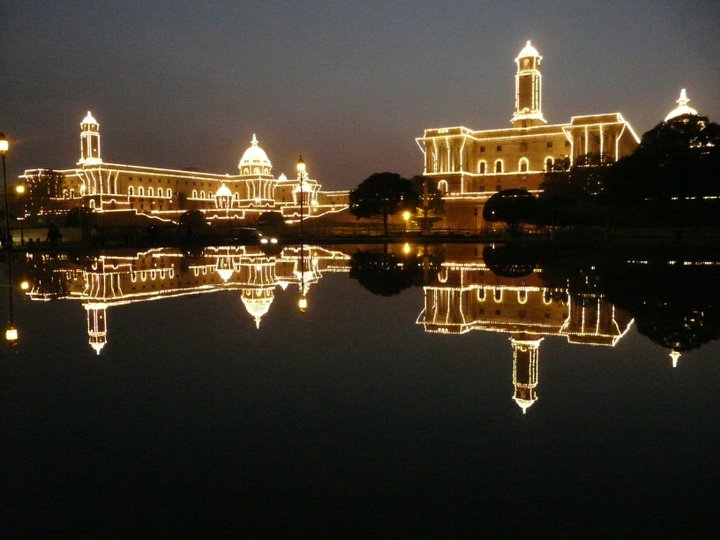
North and South Block of the Secretariat Building illuminated

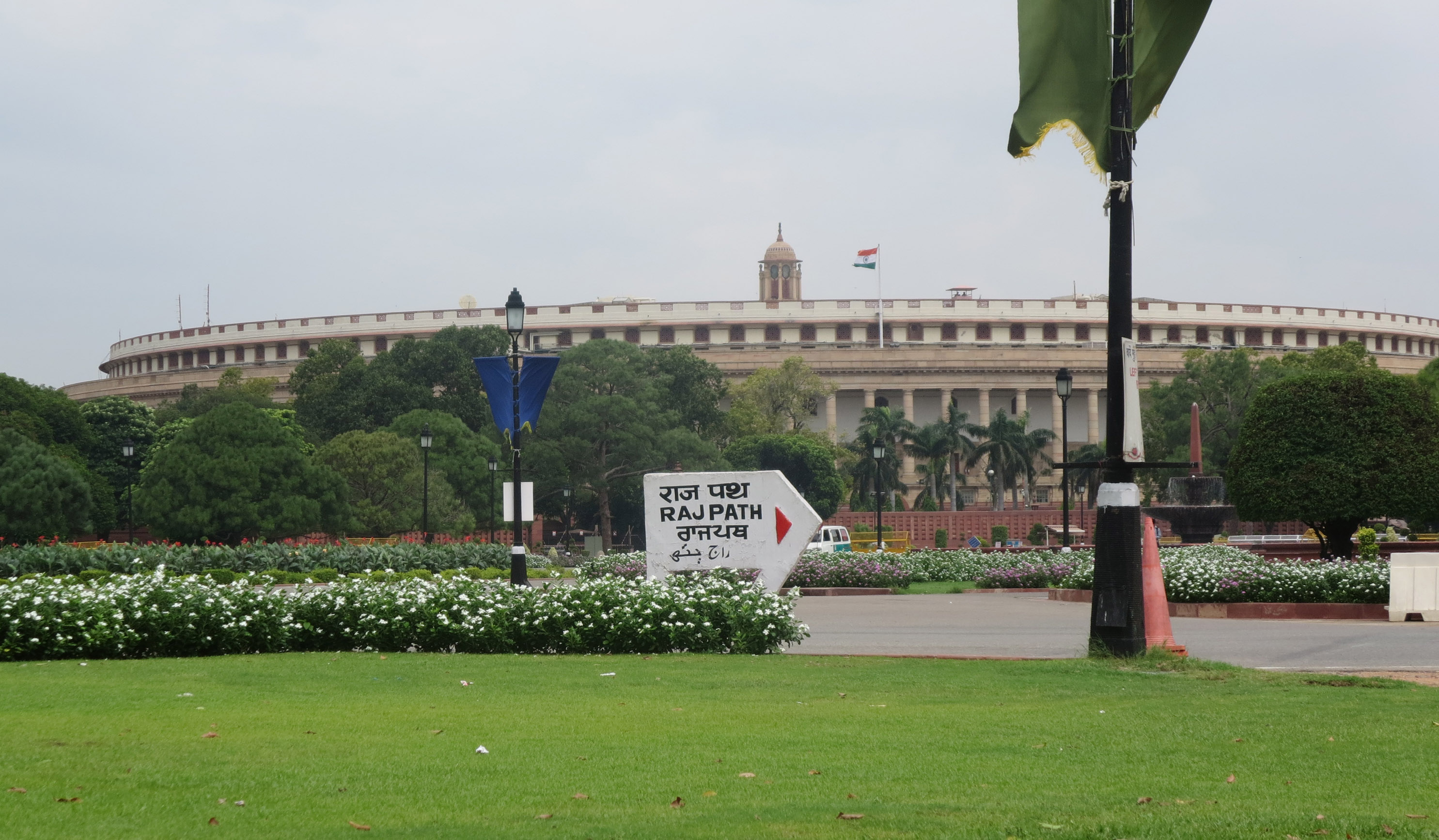
Old Parliament House as seen from the Rajpath

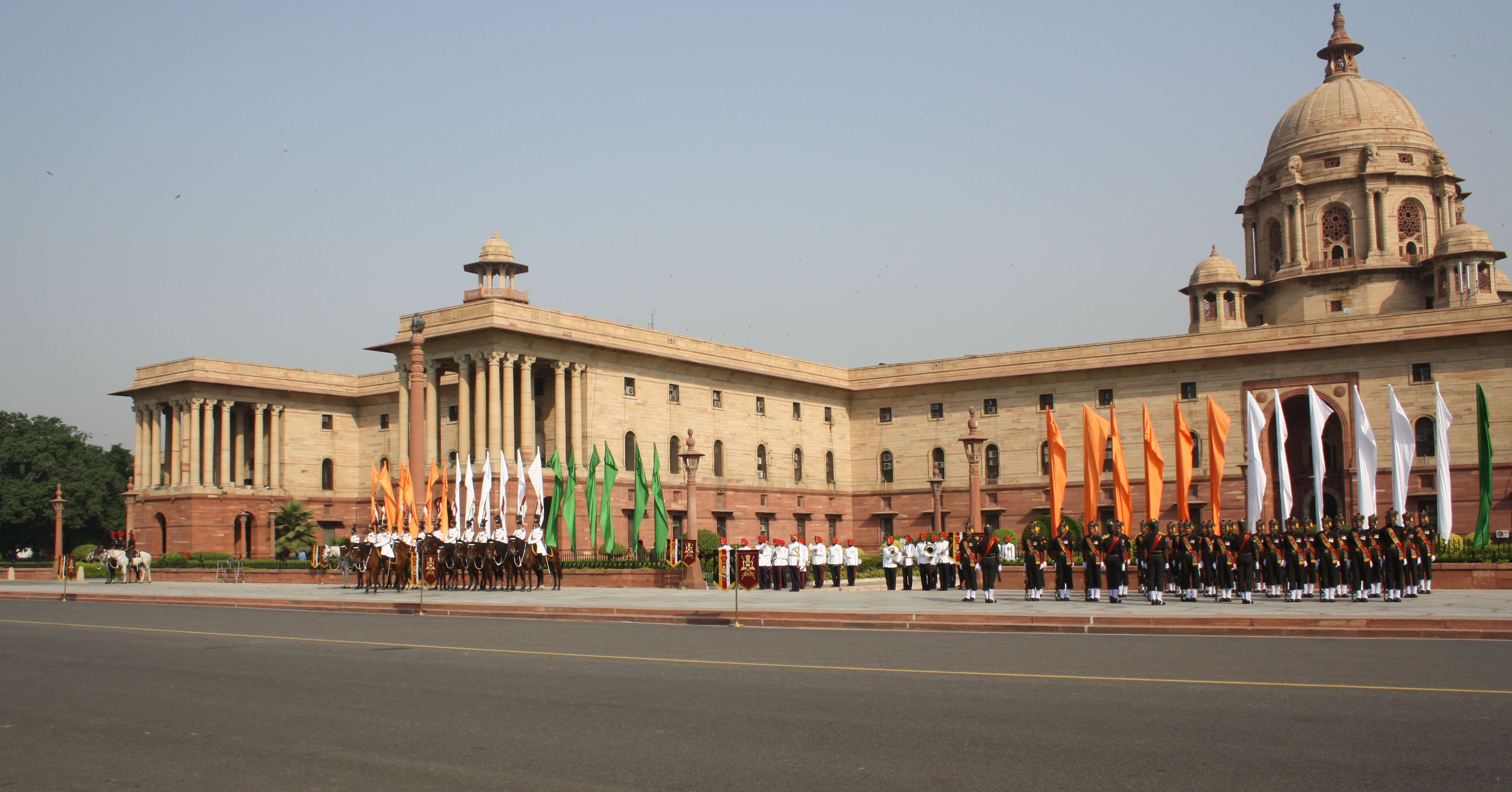
North Block of the Secretariat Building seen from Rajpath

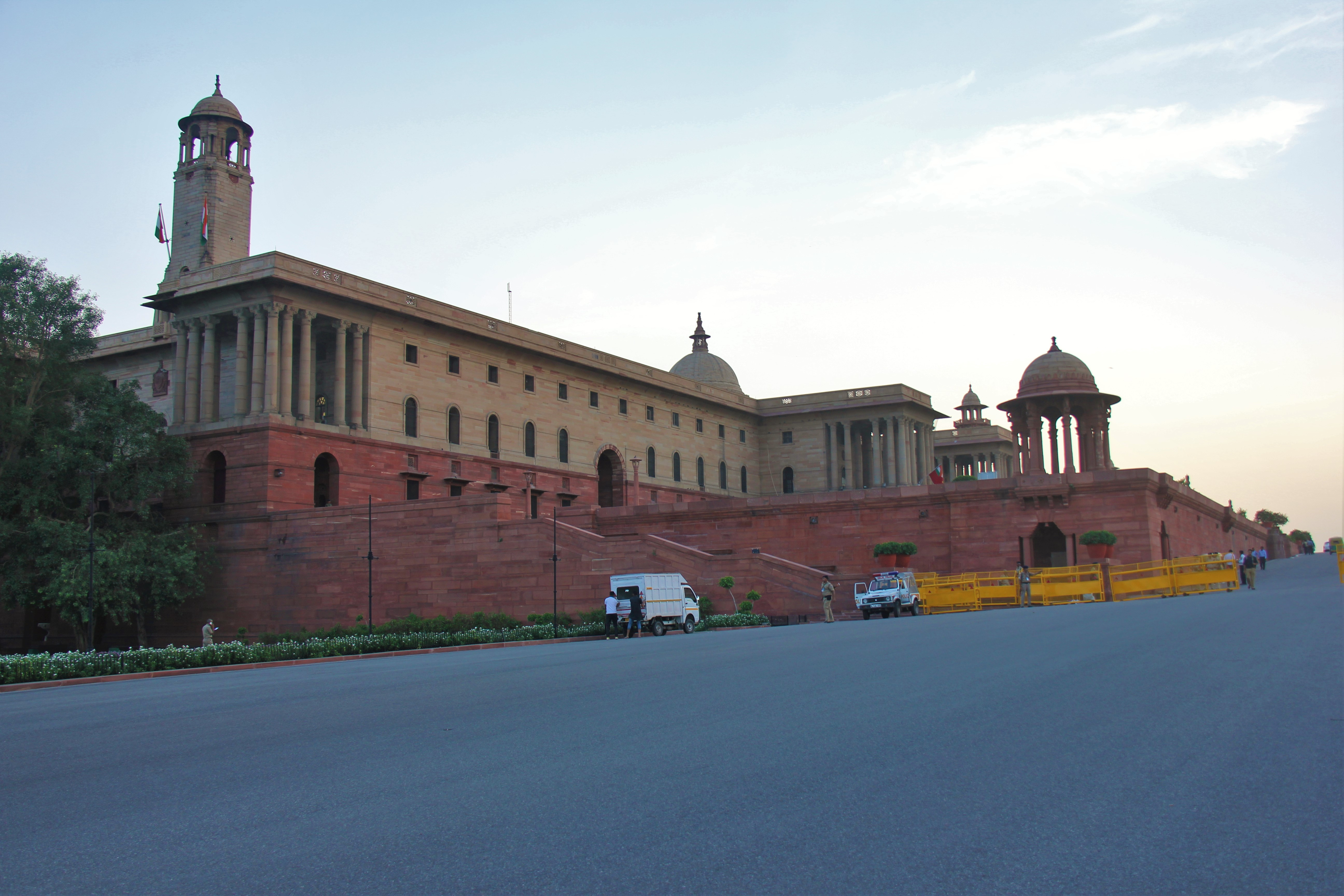
South Block of the Secretariat Building seen from Rajpath

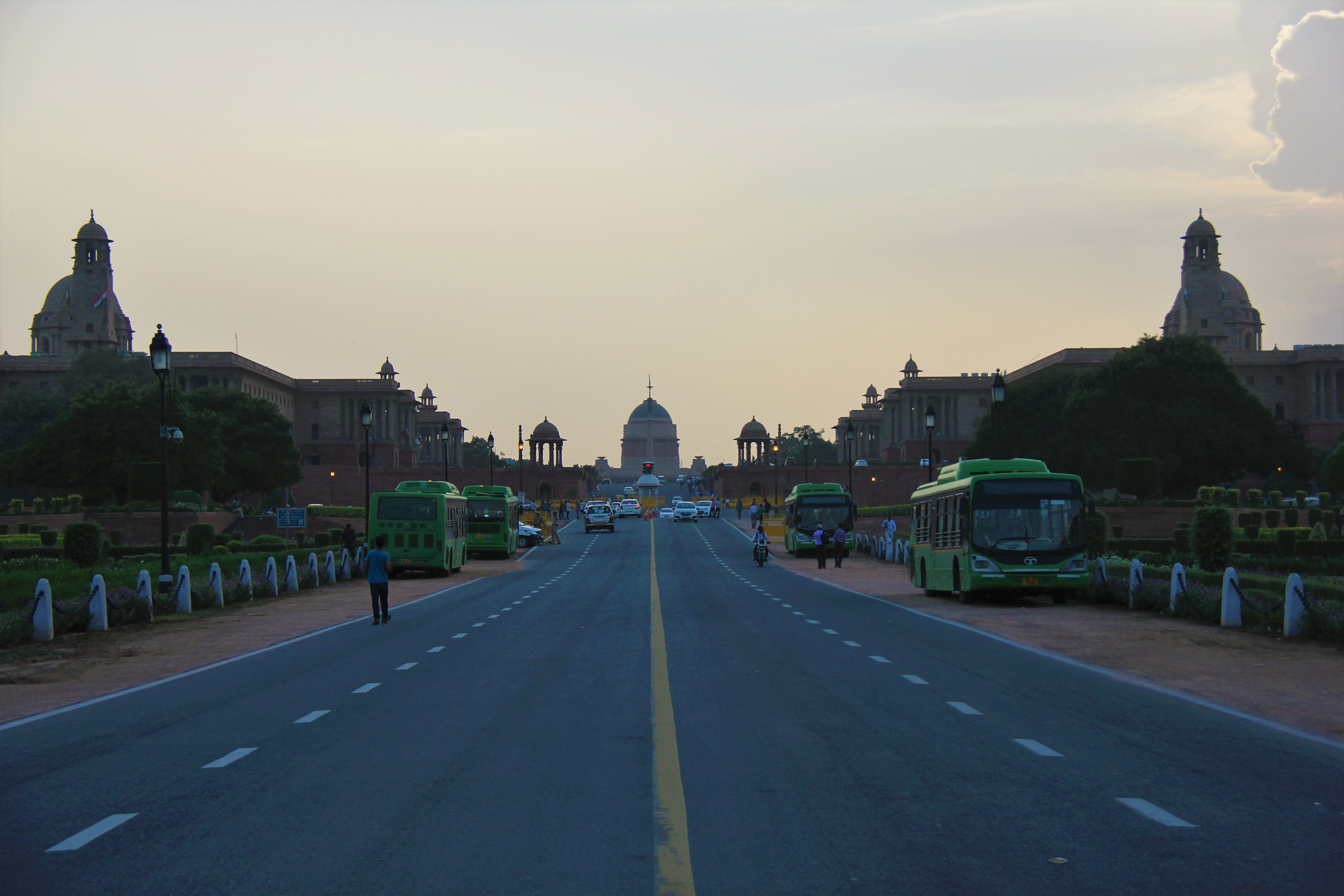
Rashtrapati Bhavan seen from Rajpath

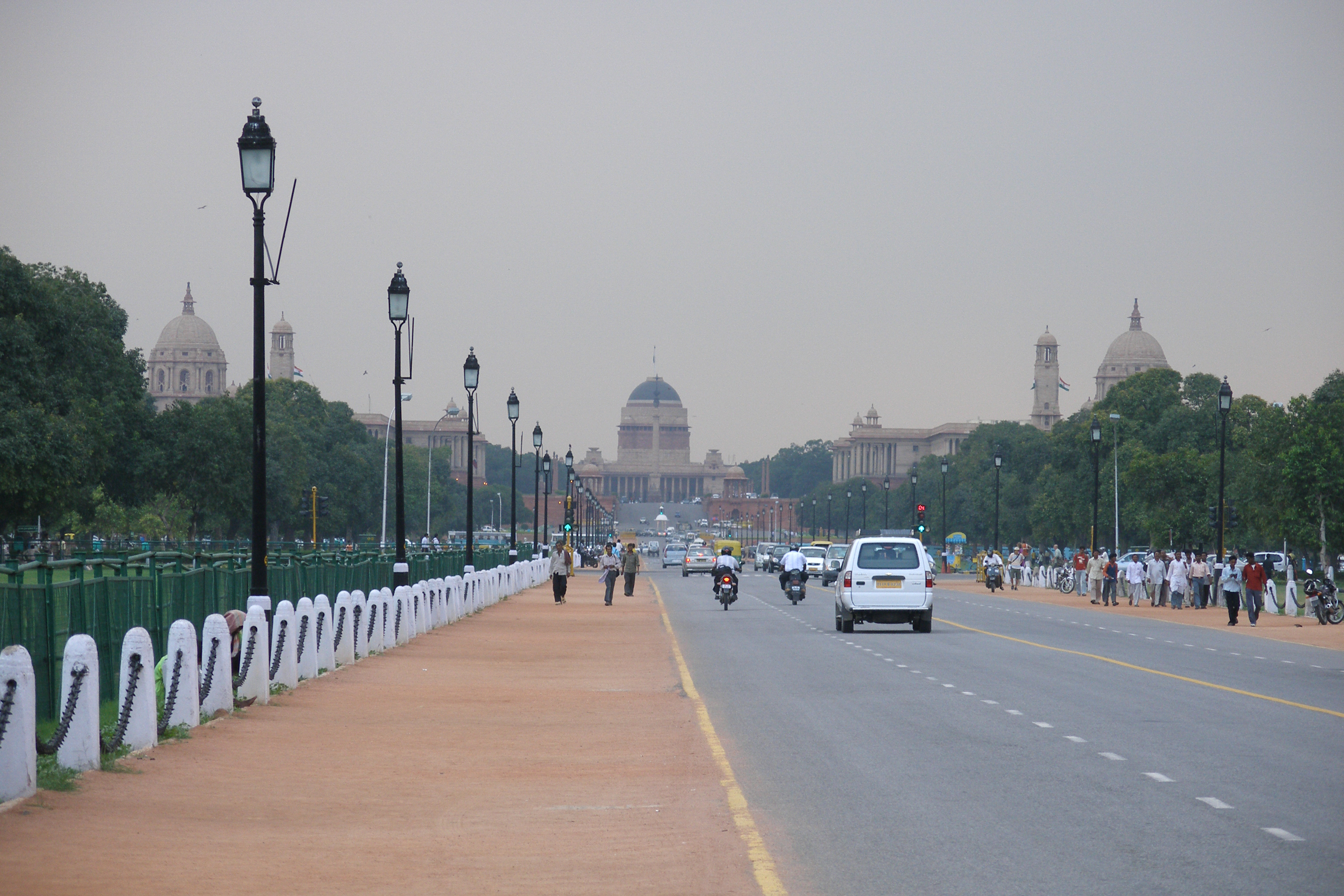
Panoramic view of Rajpath

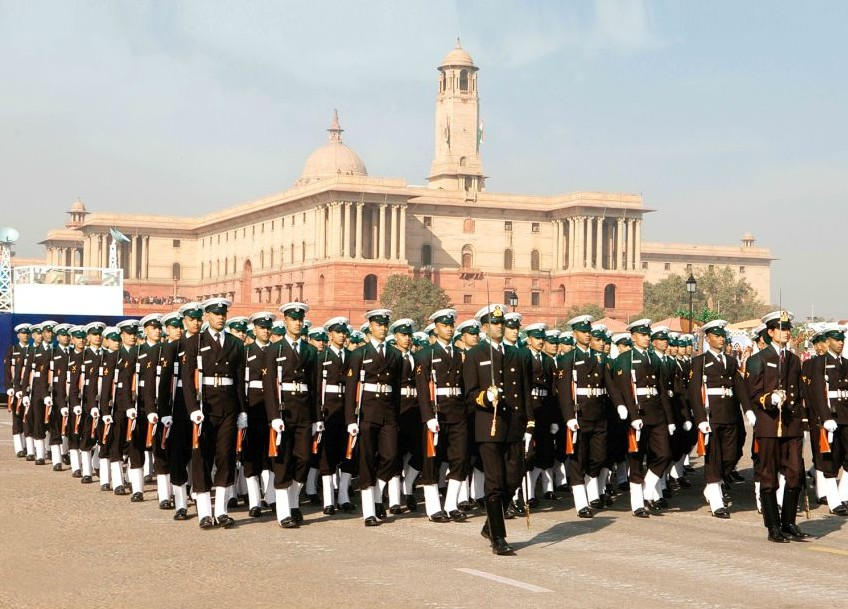
Indian Naval contingent marching on the Rajpath during Delhi Republic Day parade

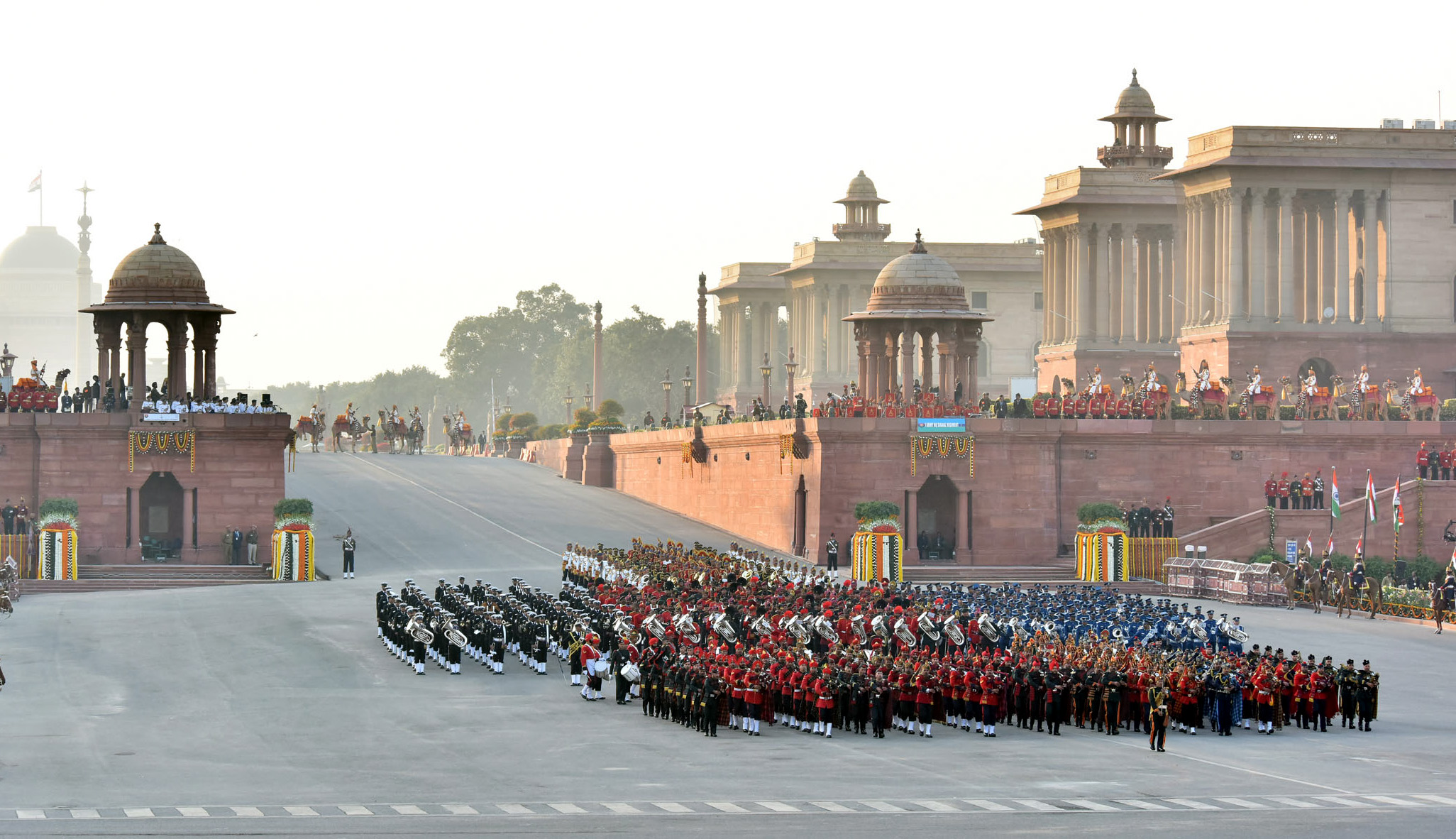
A band performance at India's Beat Retreat ceremony at Vijay Chowk in 2018.

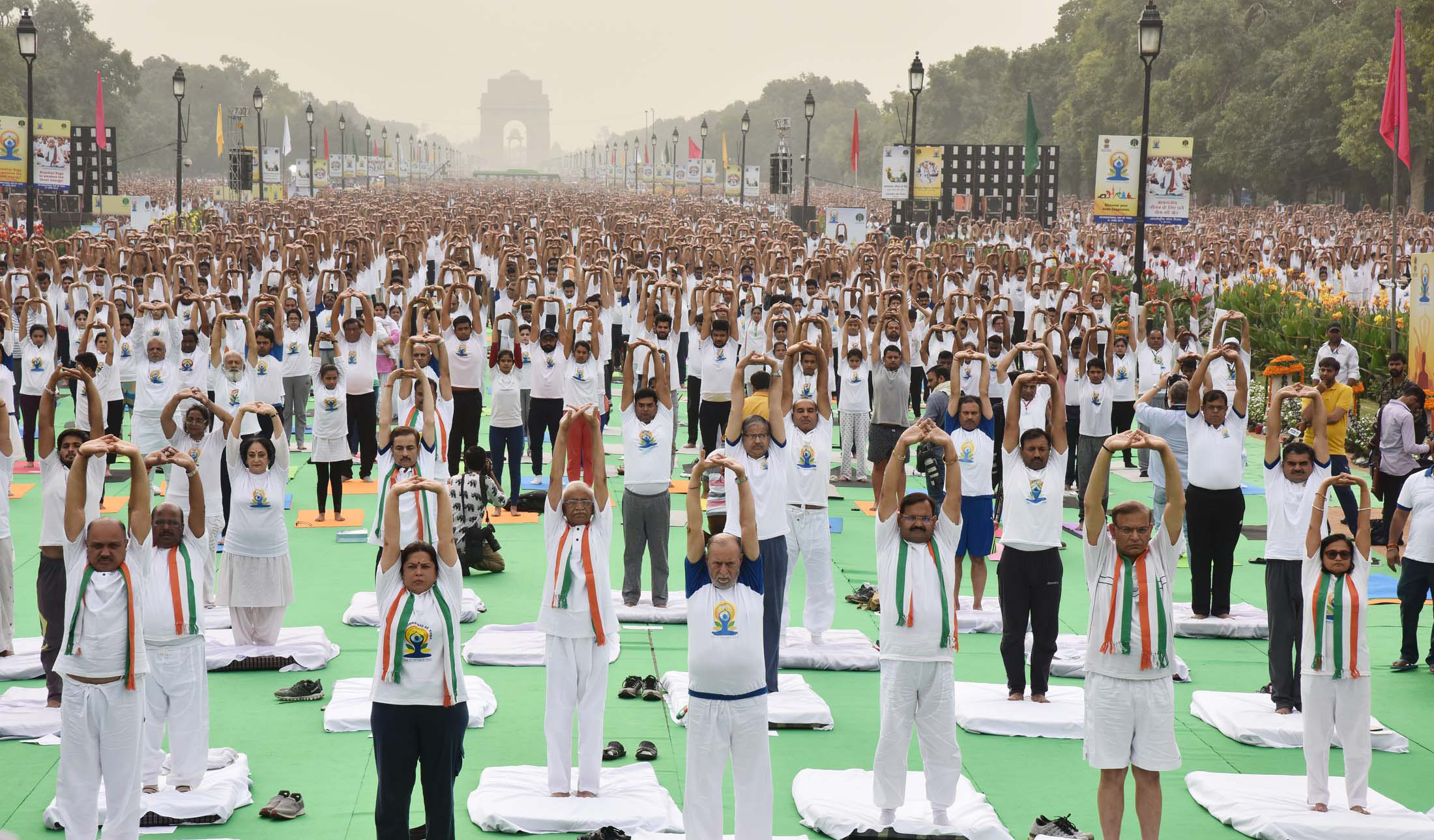
International Day of Yoga on 21 June 2018
