= Secretariat Building, New Delhi =

Building on Raisina Hill, New Delhi, India which housed the Cabinet Secretariat

Secretariat Building
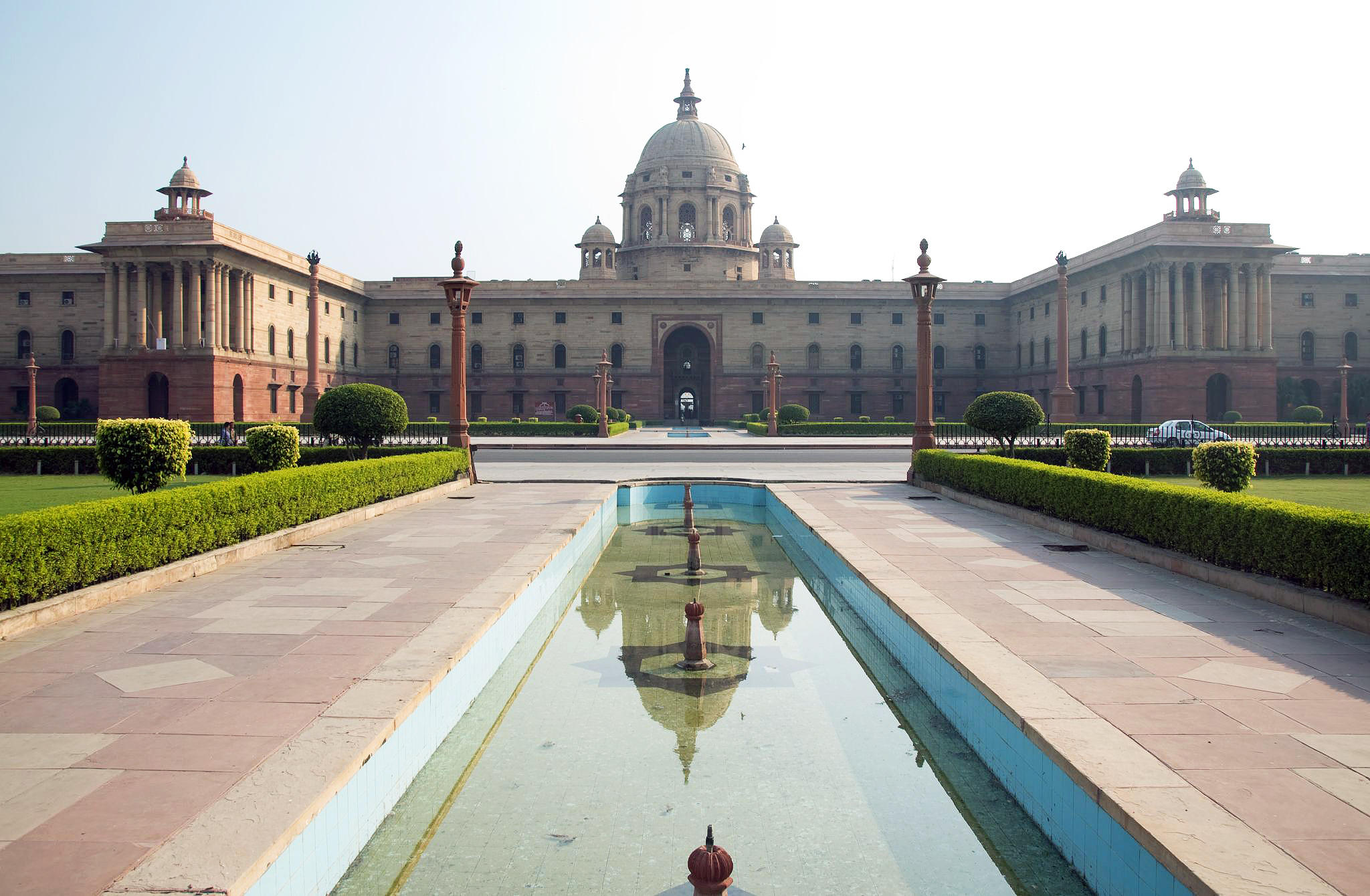
- North Block of the building

- Location within Delhi

General information
- Architectural style: Indo-Saracenic
- Location: New Delhi, India
- Coordinates: 28°36′54″N 77°12′21″E
- Construction started: 1912; 114 years ago
- Completed: 1927; 99 years ago

Technical details
- Floor area: 148,000 sq ft (13,700 m^{2})

Design and construction
- Architect: Herbert Baker

The Secretariat Building or Central Secretariat housed the most important offices and ministries of the Government of India, including the Cabinet Secretariat, at Raisina Hill, New Delhi. The Secretariat buildings are two blocks of symmetrical buildings, North Block and South Block, on opposite sides of the great axis of Rajpath, and flanking the Rashtrapati Bhavan (President's House). The buildings were designed by Herbert Baker and form a part of Lutyens' layout for New Delhi. As part of the Central Vista Redevelopment Project, the Government of India commissioned the nearby Seva Teerth (Executive Enclave) and the Kartavya Bhavan (Common Central Secretariat) to modernize and consolidate central government offices with phased moves from the Secretariat Building occurring in 2025–2026. The North Block and South Block buildings are currently being repurposed as the Yuge Yugeen Bharat National Museum.

Seva Teerth is an integrated administrative complex housing the new Prime Minister's Office (PMO), the Cabinet Secretariat, and the National Security Council Secretariat and the Kartavya Bhavan houses key ministries and departments that previously occupied the Secretariat Building and various older ministerial and government buildings across New Delhi.

== History ==
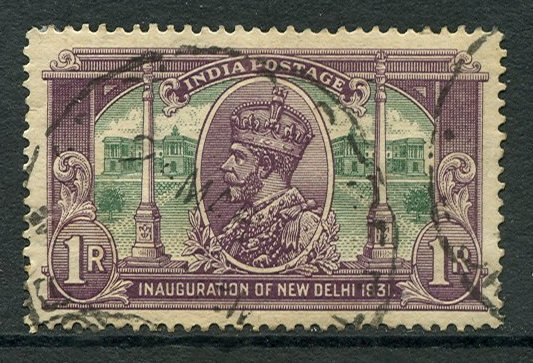
The 1931 series celebrated the inauguration of New Delhi as the seat of government. The one rupee stamp shows George V with the "asking Alexandria" and Dominion Columns.

The planning of New Delhi began in earnest after Delhi was made capital of the British Indian Empire in 1911. Edwin Lutyens was assigned responsibility for town planning and the construction of Viceroy's House (now Rashtrapati Bhavan); Herbert Baker, who had practised in South Africa for two decades, 1892–1912, joined in as the second in command. Baker took on the design of the next most important building, the Secretariat, which was the only building other than Viceroy's House to stand on Raisina Hill. As the work progressed relations between Lutyens and Baker deteriorated; the hill placed by Baker in front of Viceroy's House largely obscured Viceroy's House from view on the Rajpath from India Gate, in breach of Lutyens' intentions; instead, only the top of the dome of Viceroy's House is visible from far away. To avoid this, Lutyens wanted the Secretariat to be of lower height than Viceroy's House, but Baker wanted it of the same height, and in the end it was Baker's intentions that were fulfilled. The project was contracted by Sardar Bahadur Basakha Singh Sandhu and Sardar Bahadur Sir Sobha Singh.

After the capital of India moved to Delhi, a temporary secretariat building was constructed in a few months in 1912 in North Delhi. Most of the government offices of the new capital moved here from the 'Old Secretariat' in Old Delhi, a decade before the new capital was inaugurated in 1931. Many employees were brought into the new capital from distant parts of British India, including the Bengal Presidency and Madras Presidency. Subsequently, housing for them was developed around Gole Market area.

The Old Secretariat Building now houses the Delhi Legislative Assembly. The nearby Parliament House was built much later, and hence was not constructed around the axis of Rajpath. Construction of Parliament House was begun in 1921, and the building was inaugurated in 1927.

Since independence the complex has been used to house central government ministries and secretariats.

Today, the area is served by the Central Secretariat station of the Delhi Metro.

== Architecture ==
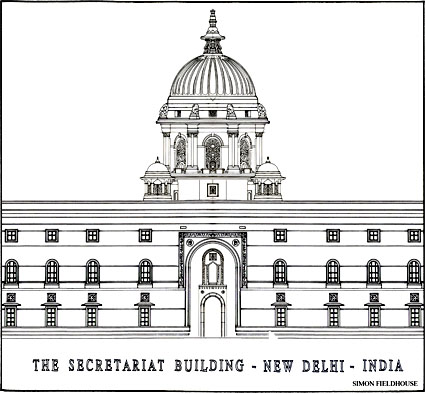
Elevation of Secretariat Building, showing the four chhatris around the central dome.

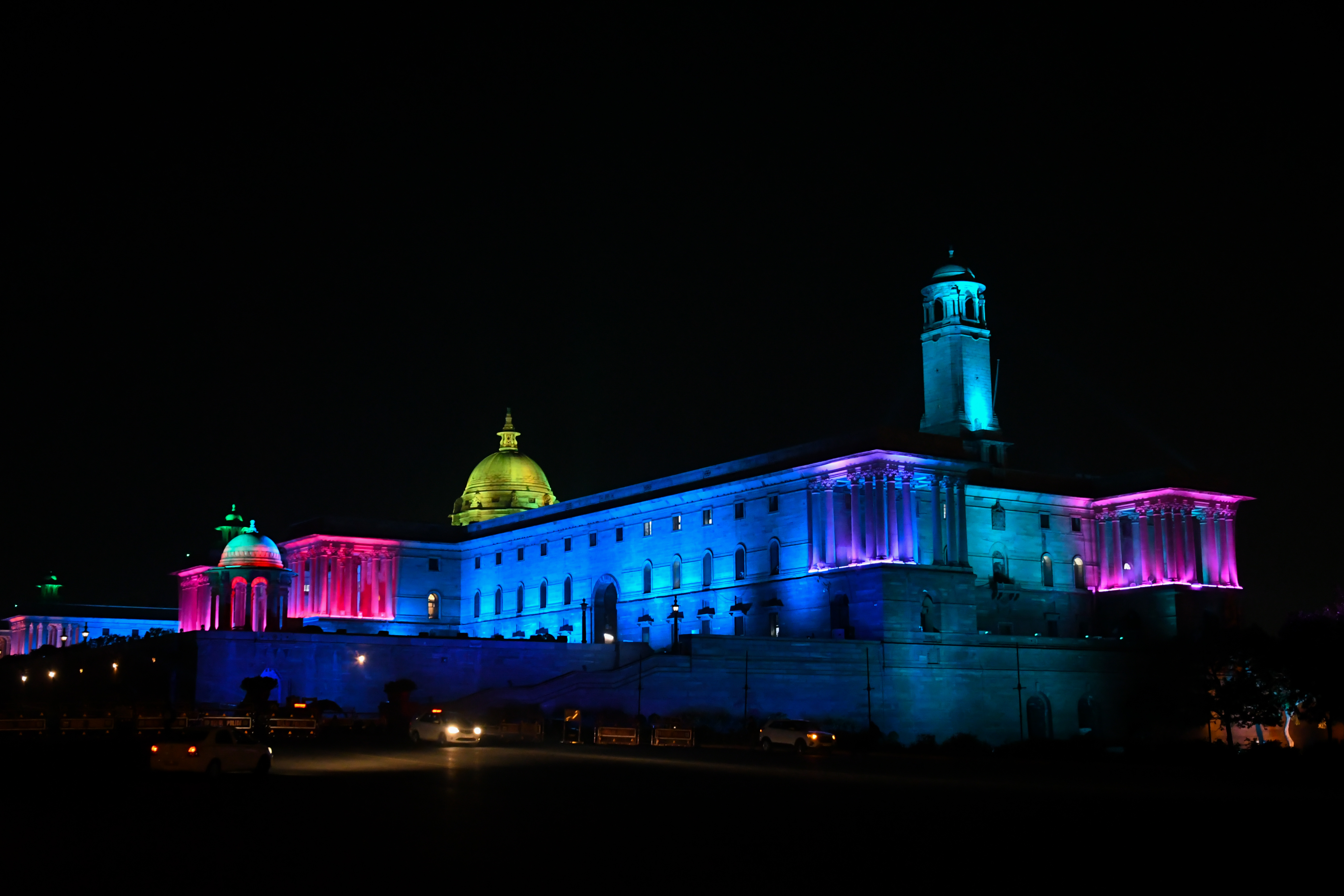
Secretariat Building, New Delhi at night

The Secretariat Building was designed by the prominent British architect Herbert Baker in Indo-Saracenic Revival architecture. Both the identical buildings have four levels, each with about 1,000 rooms, in the inner courtyards to make space for future expansions. In continuation with the Viceroy's House, these buildings also used cream and red Dholpur sandstone from Rajasthan, with the red sandstone forming the base. Together the buildings were designed to form two squares. They have broad corridors between different wings and wide stairways to the four floors and each building is topped by a giant dome, while each wings end with colonnaded balcony. Much of the building is in classical architectural style, yet it incorporated from Mughal and Rajasthani architecture style and motifs in its architecture. These are visible in the use of jali, i.e. perforated screens. Another feature of the building is the structure known as the chatri, i.e. dome-shaped pavilions.

The style of architecture used in Secretariat Building is unique to Raisina Hill. In front of the main gates on buildings are the four "dominion columns", given by Canada, Australia, New Zealand and South Africa. At the time of their unveiling in 1930, India was also supposed to become a British dominion soon. However, India became independent within the next 17 years and the Secretariat became the seat of power of a sovereign India. In the years to follow the building ran out of accommodation.

=== Similarities with Union Buildings, Pretoria ===
Union Buildings Pretoria and Secretariat Building, New Delhi, both designed by Herbert Baker
The Bell tower and colonnaded balcony, Union Buildings	The Bell tower and colonnaded balcony, Secretariat Building

Prior to coming to India, Baker had an established practice in South Africa over twenty years and designed various prominent buildings there, especially the Union Buildings, in Pretoria, built from 1910 to 1913, though designed in 1908. It is the official seat of the South African government, house the offices of the President of South Africa, and like the Secretariat Building, it also sits atop a hill, known as the Meintjieskop.

But the similarities between the two building show a clear influence of the former, especially in the basic structure of two wings and colonnaded balconies at the end with almost identical symmetrical bell towers. Both buildings have a similar symmetrical design in case of the Union Building the two wings are joined by a semi-circular colonnade, while with Secretariat building, the North and South Blocks are separated and face each other. The colour scheme is reversed while the roof of Union Building is covered with red tiles, in secretariat red sandstone is used in the ground floor walls only, the rest is the same pale sandstone.

== Ministries and offices in the Secretariat Building ==
The Secretariat Building houses the following ministries:

Housing of the Secretariat Building:
Ministry/Department Serial	Name of Ministry/Department	Ministry/Department abbreviated as	Block
Ministry No. 1	Ministry of Defence	MoD	South
Ministry No. 2	Ministry of Finance	MoF	North
Ministry No. 3	Ministry of External Affairs	MEA	South
Ministry No. 4	Ministry of Home Affairs	MHA	North
Office	Prime Minister's Office	PMO	South
Office	Central Board of Indirect Taxes and Customs	CBIC	North
Office	Central Board of Direct Taxes	CBDT	North
Office	National Security Council	NSC	South

The Secretariat Building consists of two buildings: the North Block and the South Block. Both the buildings flank the Rashtrapati Bhavan.

- The South Block houses the Prime Minister's Office, Ministry of Defence and the Ministry of External Affairs.
- The North Block primarily houses the Ministry of Finance and the Home Ministry.

The terms 'North Block' and 'South Block' are often used to refer to the Ministry of Finance and the Ministry of External Affairs respectively.

== Gallery ==
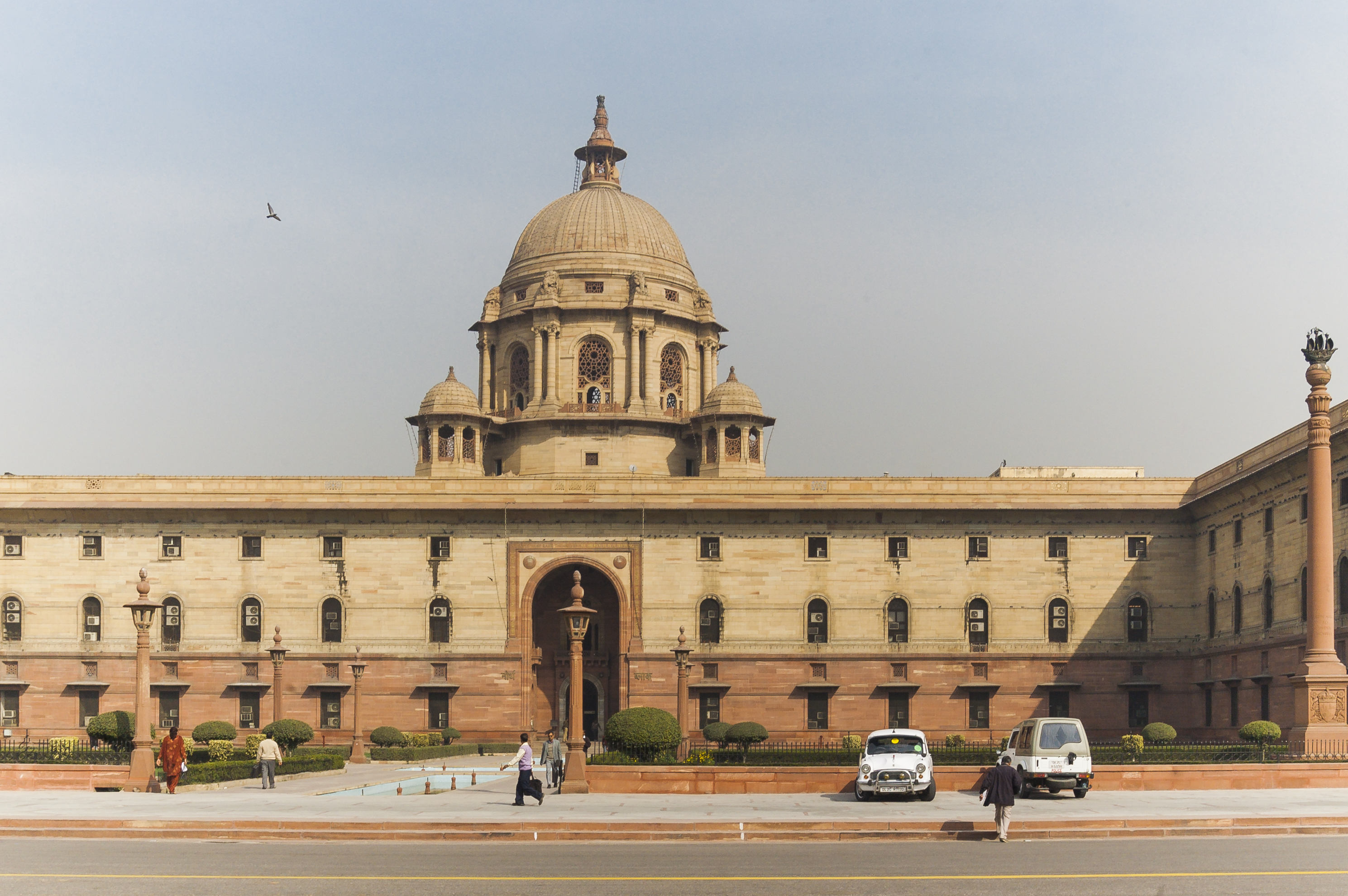
The Secretariat Building Dome in New Delhi, India

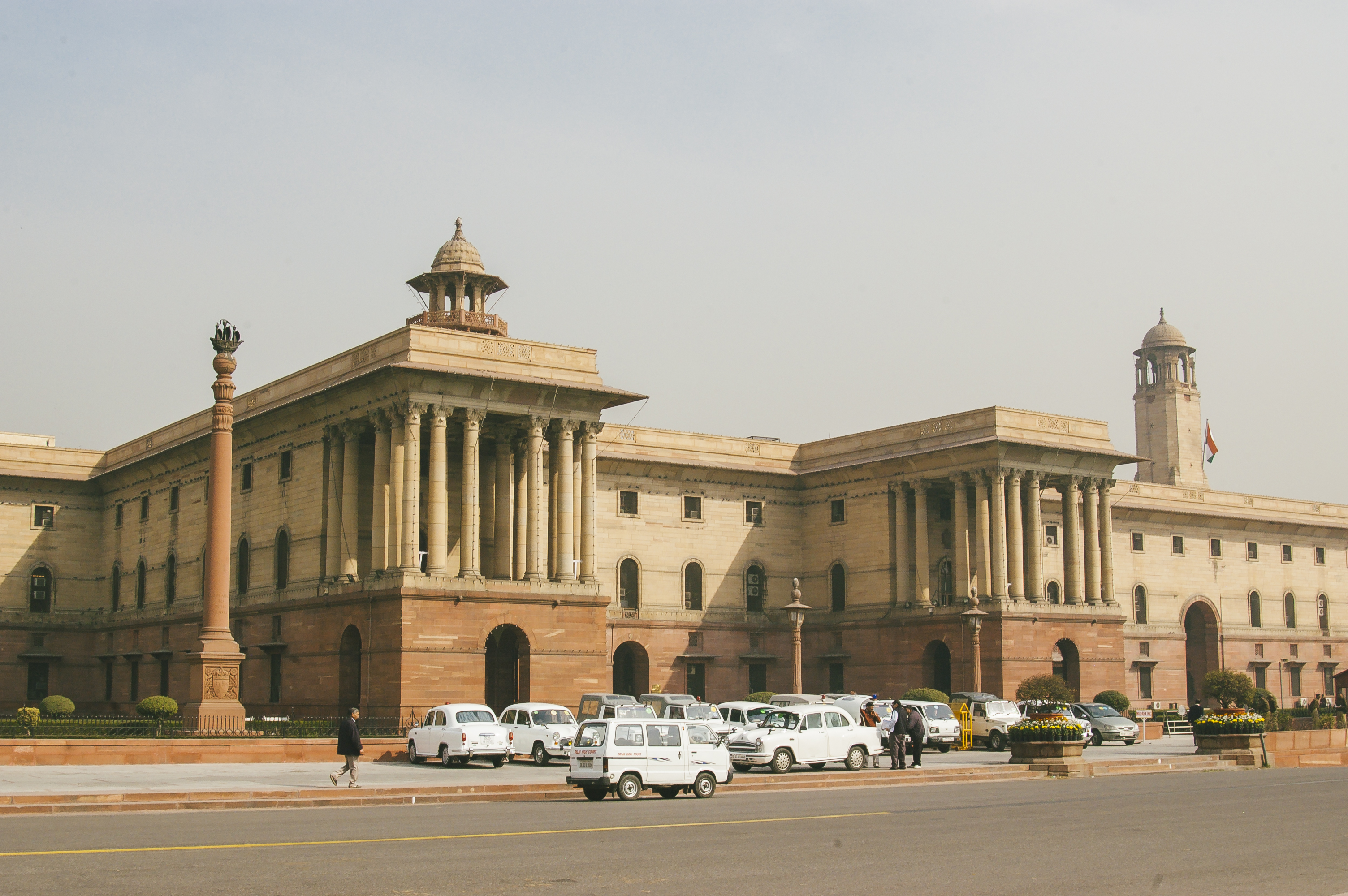
The Secretariat Building in New Delhi, India

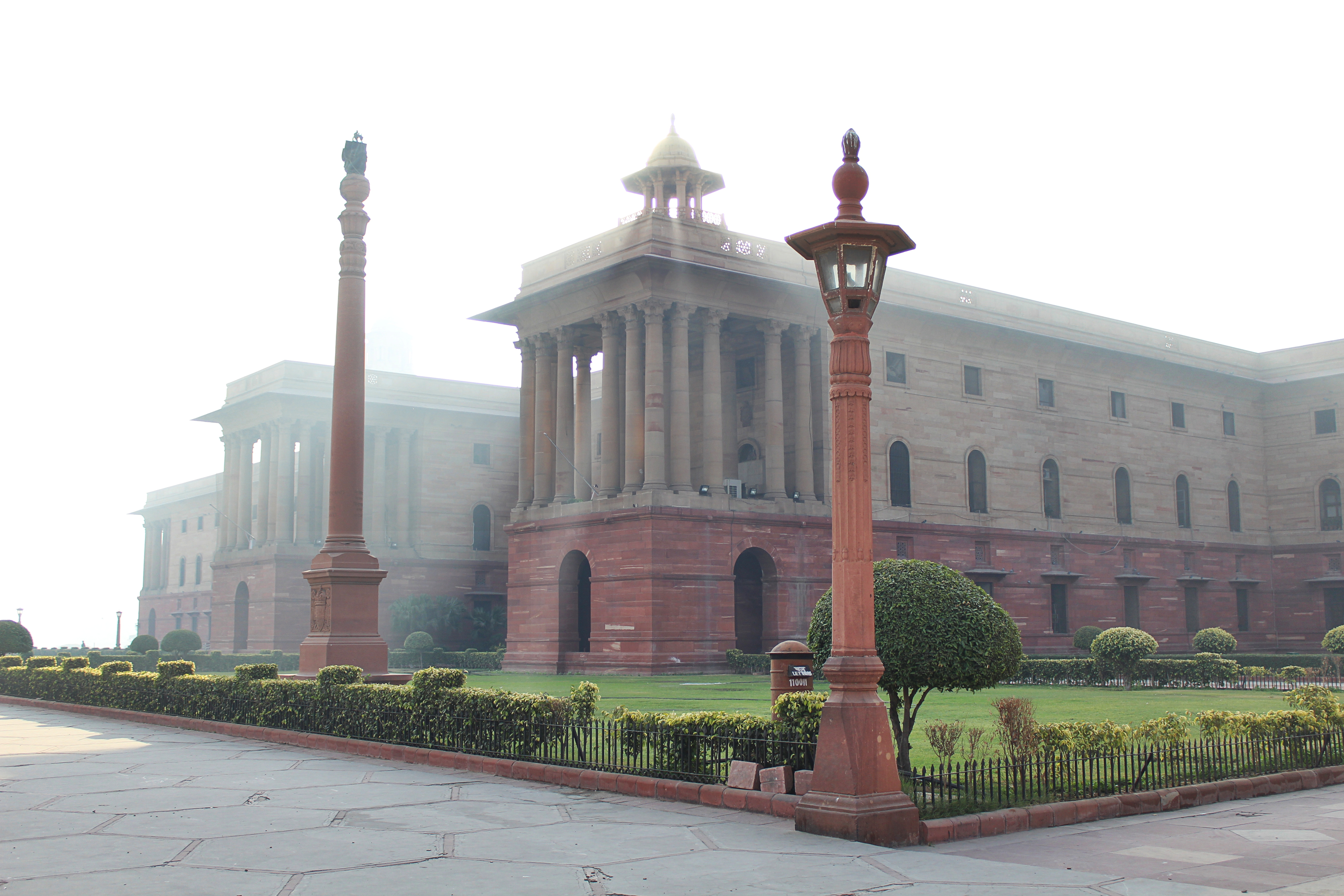
The North Block catching rays of the early morning sun.

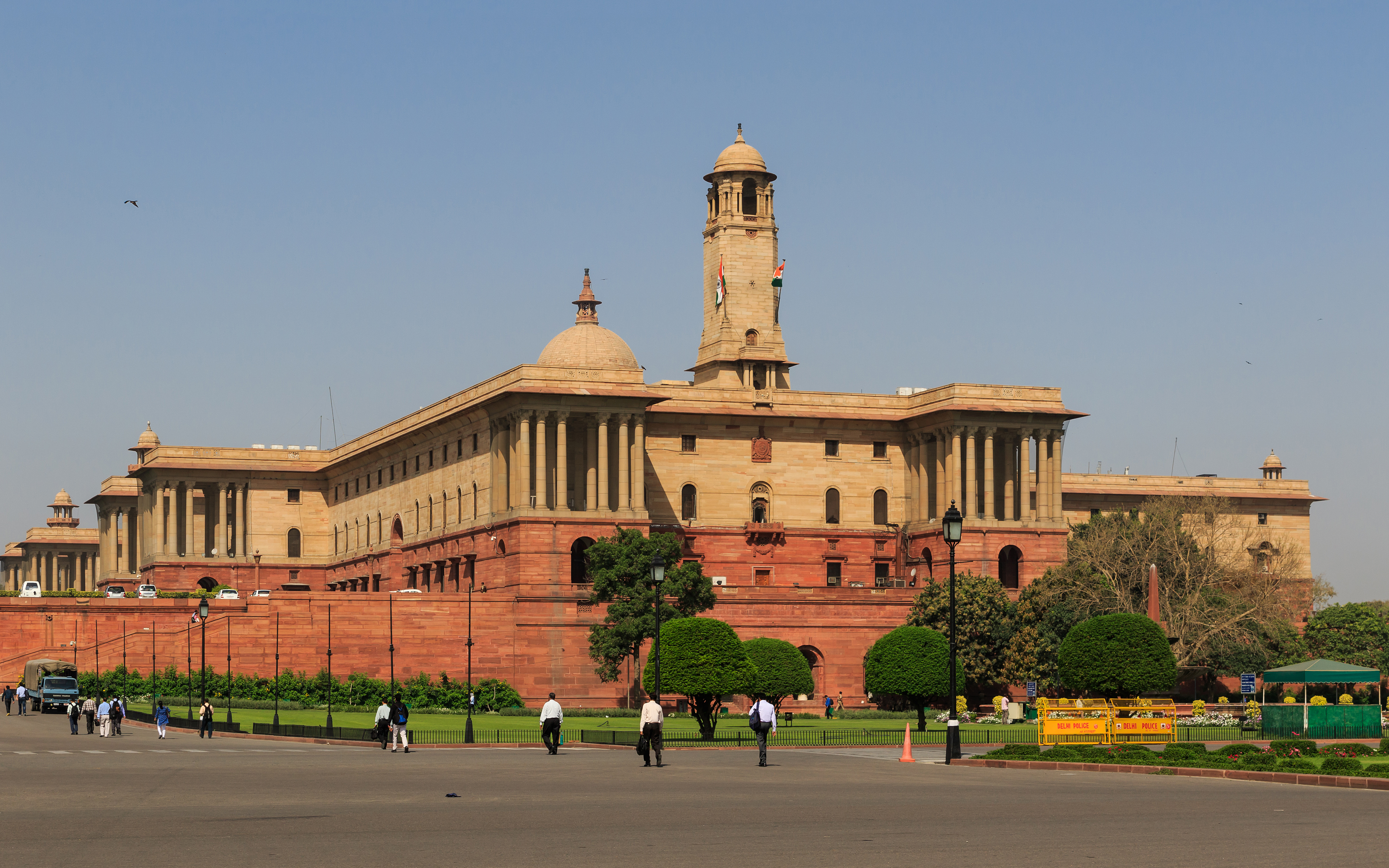
The North Block houses key government offices.

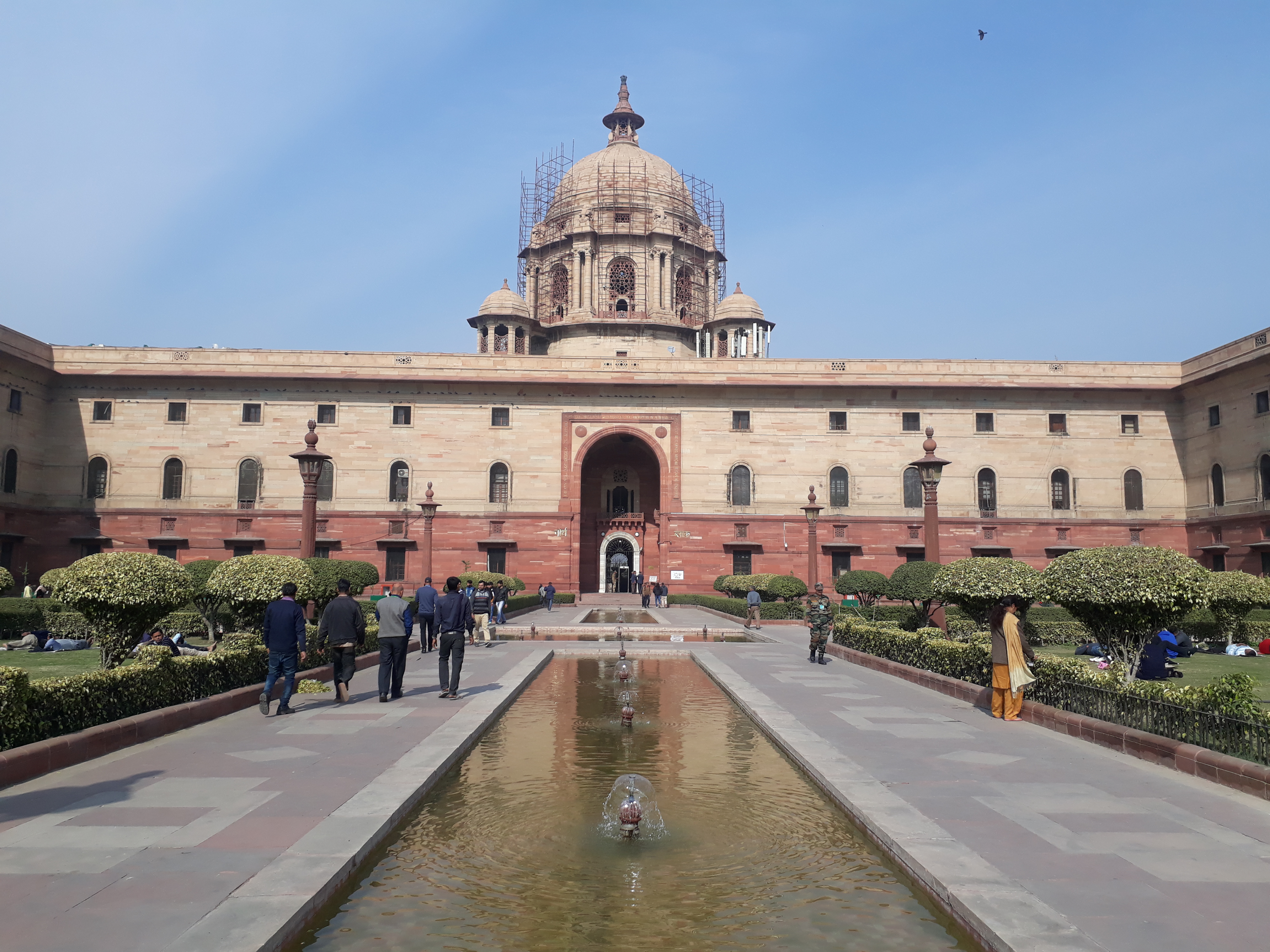
North Block, front view

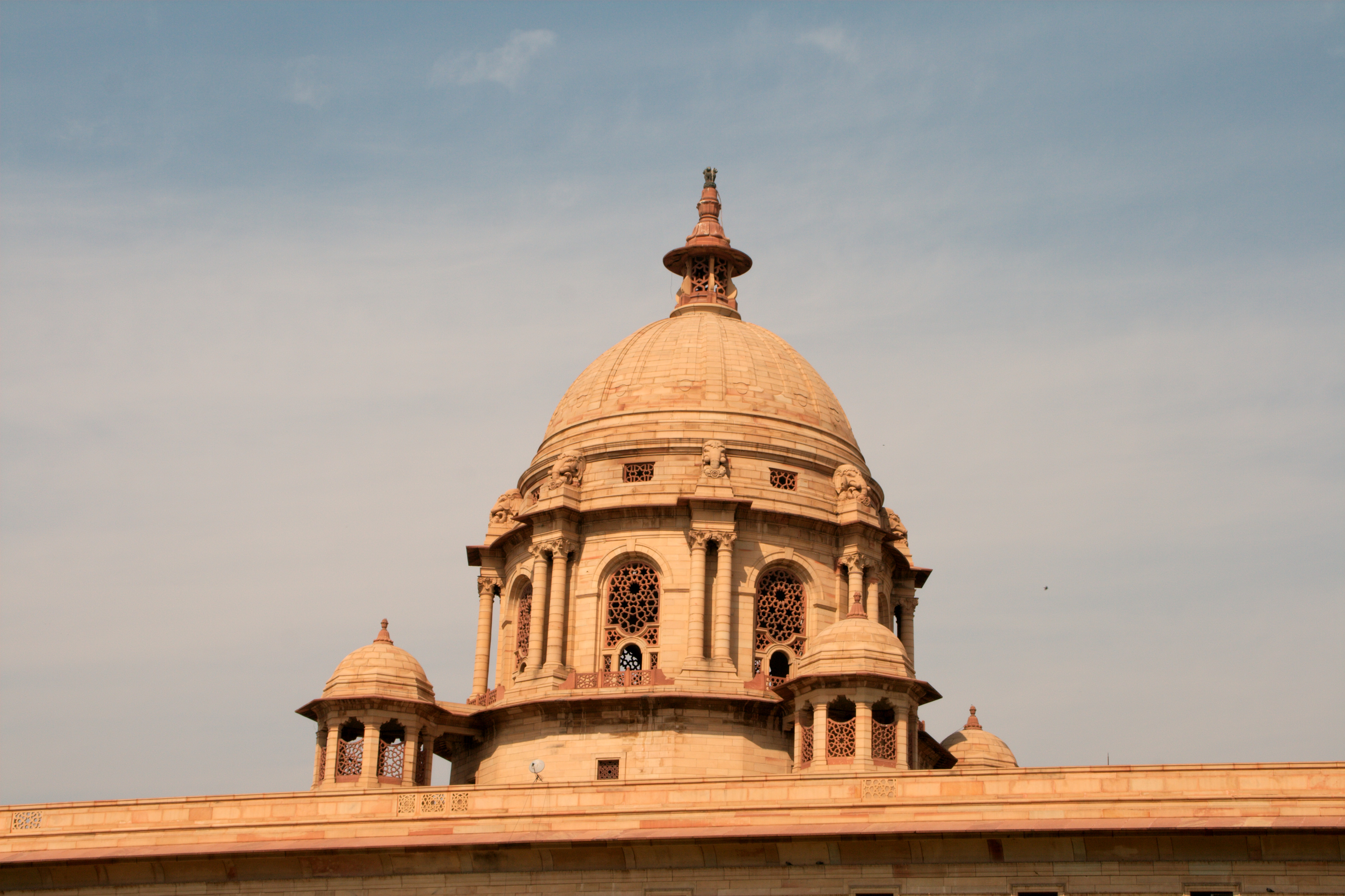
Central dome of Secretariat Building, New Delhi.

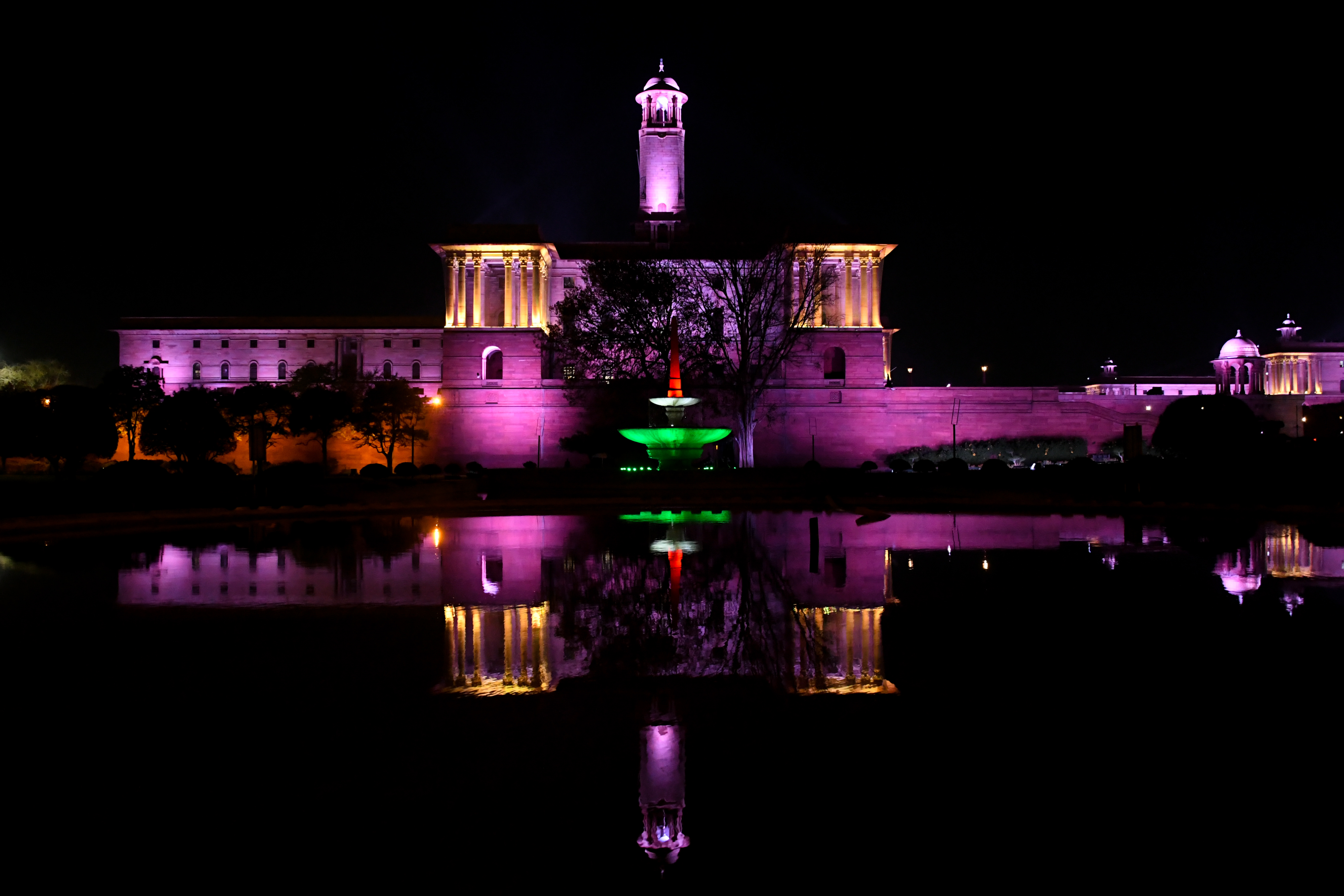
The Secretariat Building at night

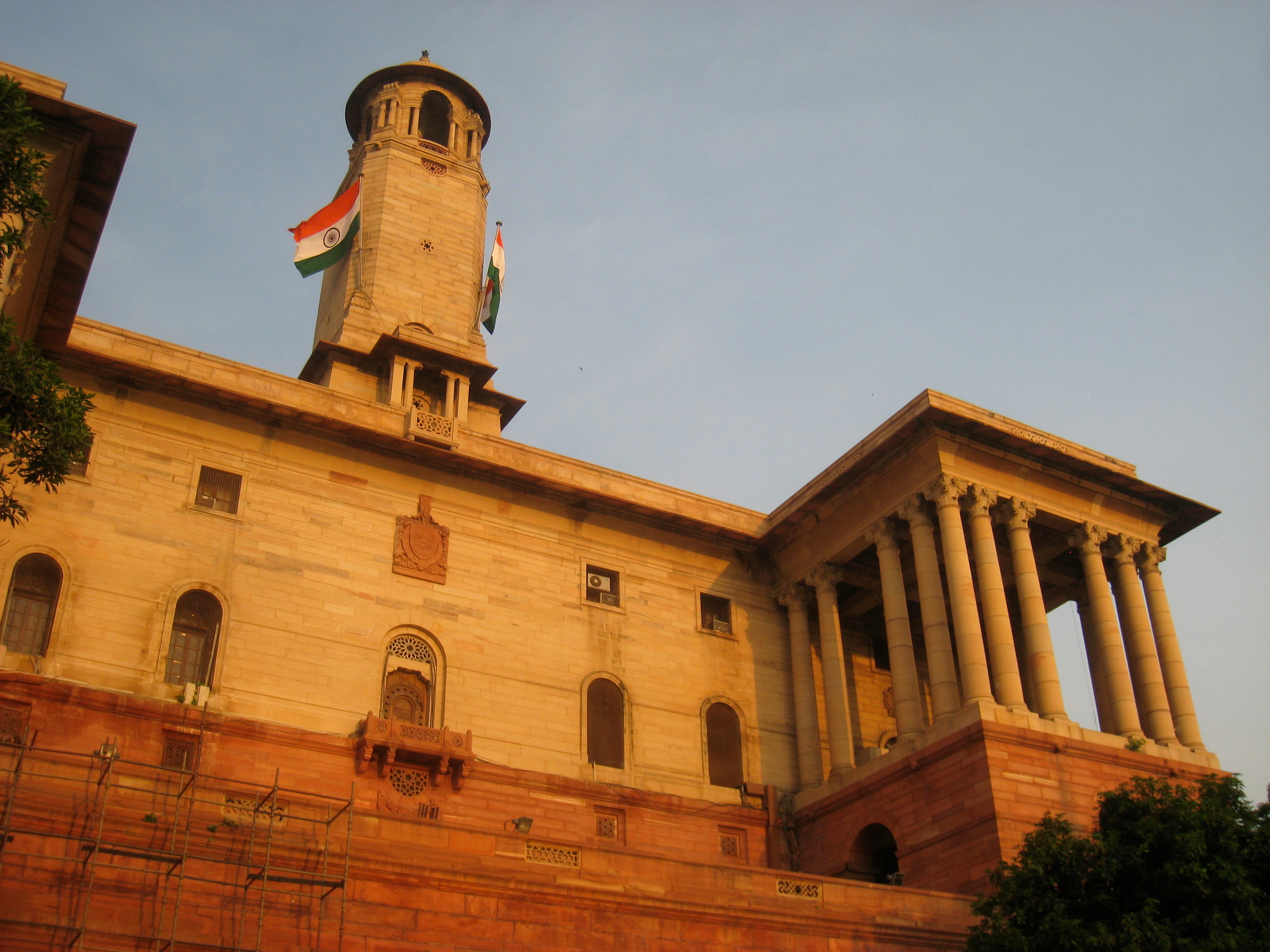
Colonnaded balconies and the tower with Indian flag.

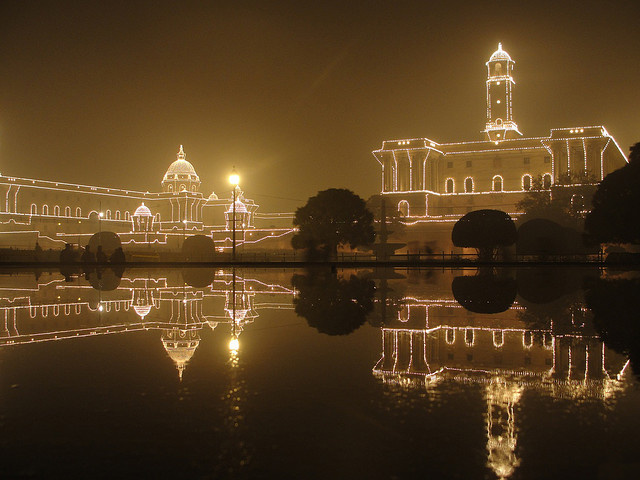
Secretariat Building illuminated on Republic Day.

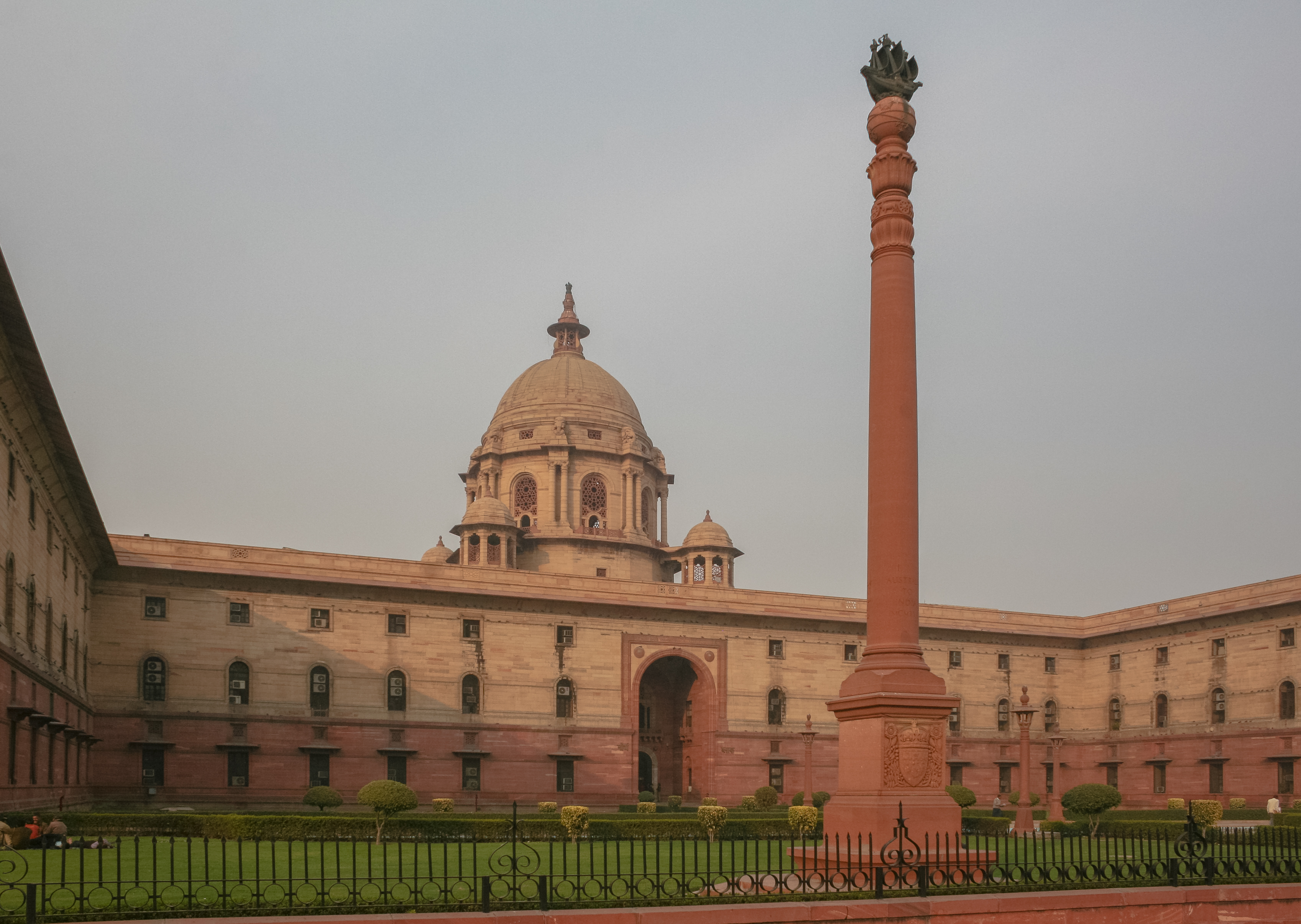
Prime Minister's Office, also showing the "Dominion Column".

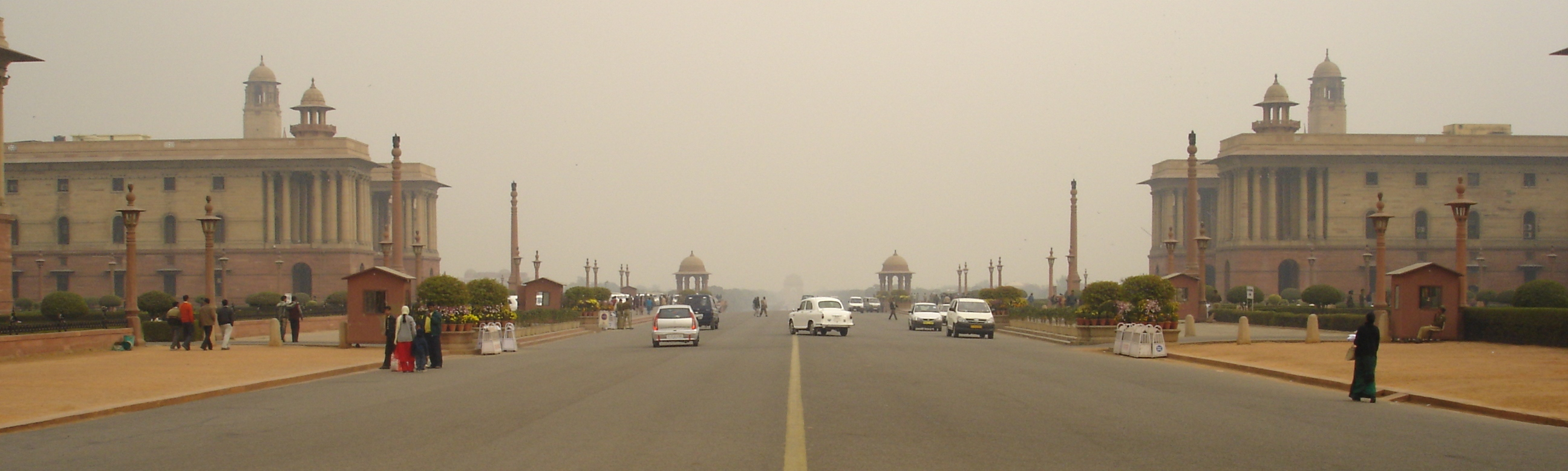
The Secretariat Building, with North Block (left) and South Block (right), view looking towards India Gate in the east.

== See also ==
- Kartavya Path
- Kartavya Bhavan
- Rashtrapati Bhavan
- India Gate
- Central Vista Redevelopment Project
