= Sujata =

Sujata or Sujatha may refer to:

== People ==
- Sujata (name), a Hindu/Sanskrit Indian feminine given name includes list of name-holders

=== Persons known by the single name ===
- Sujatha (actress) (1952-2011), Indian actress
- Sujata (actress) (fl. 1963–present), Bangladeshi film actress
- Sujata of Sujata and seven types of wives, in the Buddha's teaching
- Sujata (milkmaid), who is said to have fed milk and rice to Gautama Buddha
- Sujata, a name of the Hindu goddess Lakshmi
- Sujā, or Sujātā, is queen of the Heaven of the Thirty-Three in Theravada Buddhism

=== Persons with the given name ===
- Sujata (dancer), Indian dancer of the Sujata and Asoka duo
- Sujatha (writer) (1935–2008), Indian author
- Sujatha Singh (born 1954), Indian civil servant
- Sujatha Mohan (born 1963), Indian playback singer, known professionally as Sujatha
- Alisha Chinai (born Sujatha Chinai; 1965), Indian singer

=== Persons with the surname ===
- C. S. Sujatha (born 1965), Indian politician

== Films and television ==
- Sujatha (1953 film), directed by T. Sundaram, D. V. Chari.
- Sujata (1959 film), directed by Bimal Roy.
- Sujatha (1980 film), directed by Mohan.
- Sujata (TV series), a 2008 Indian TV series.

== Other uses ==
- Sujatha Vidyalaya, girls' secondary school in Sri Lanka
- Sujata Sadan, theatre auditorium in Kolkata, West Bengal, India
- INS Sujata (P56), Sukanya class patrol vessel of the Indian Navy

== See also ==
- Šuja, Slovakia
