= Sujata (name) =

- Gender: Female
- Language: Hindi; Sanskrit
- Name day: 25 12 1998

Origin
- Meaning: "birth" "from a good family origin" "origin"
- Region of origin: India

Other names
- Related names: Sujatha

Sujātā (Hindi: सुजाता) is an Indian popular feminine given name, which means "birth", "from a good family origin" and"origin".

== Notable people named Sujata ==
- Sujata (milkmaid) Sujata is believed to have given a bowl of milk rice to Buddha, his last meal before enlightenment.
- Sujata Bhatt (born May 6, 1956), German-Indian poet.
- Sujata Chaudhuri (23 March 1901 - ?), Indian professor of medicine
- Sujata Day, (born June 27, 1984), American-Indian actress, model and screenwriter.
- Sujata Gadkar-Wilcox, American politician
- Sujata Manohar (born August 28, 1934), Indian judge and member of the National Human Rights Commission of India.
- Sujata Massey (born 1964), American-British writer.
- Sujata Mohapatra (born June 27, 1968), Indian choreographer and dancer
- Sujata Nahar (born December 12, 1925 – died May 4, 2007), Indian writer.
- Sujata Sridhar (born December 25, 1961), Indian cricketer.
- Sujata (actress), Bangladeshi film actress.

== Notable people named Sujatha ==
- Sujatha (actress) (born December 10, 1952 – died April 6, 2011), Indian actress.
- Sujatha Alahakoon (born March 9, 1959), Sri Lankan politician.
- Sujatha Mohan (born March 31, 1963), Indian singer.
- Sujatha (born May 3, 1935 – died February 27, 2008), Indian writer.
- Sujatha Sivakumar, Indian actress.
- C. S. Sujatha (born May 28, 1965), Indian politician and member of the 14th Lok Sabha of India.

== Others ==
- Sujata and seven types of wives, the unruly daughter-in-law of Anathapindika, a lay-disciple of the Buddha, who later became a slave-wife to her husband .
- Sujata Bhikkhuni, one of the Buddha's arahant nuns.
- Sujata is a name of the Hindu goddess Lakshmi.
