= Connaught Place, New Delhi =

Connaught Place
- Business district
- Rajiv Chowk
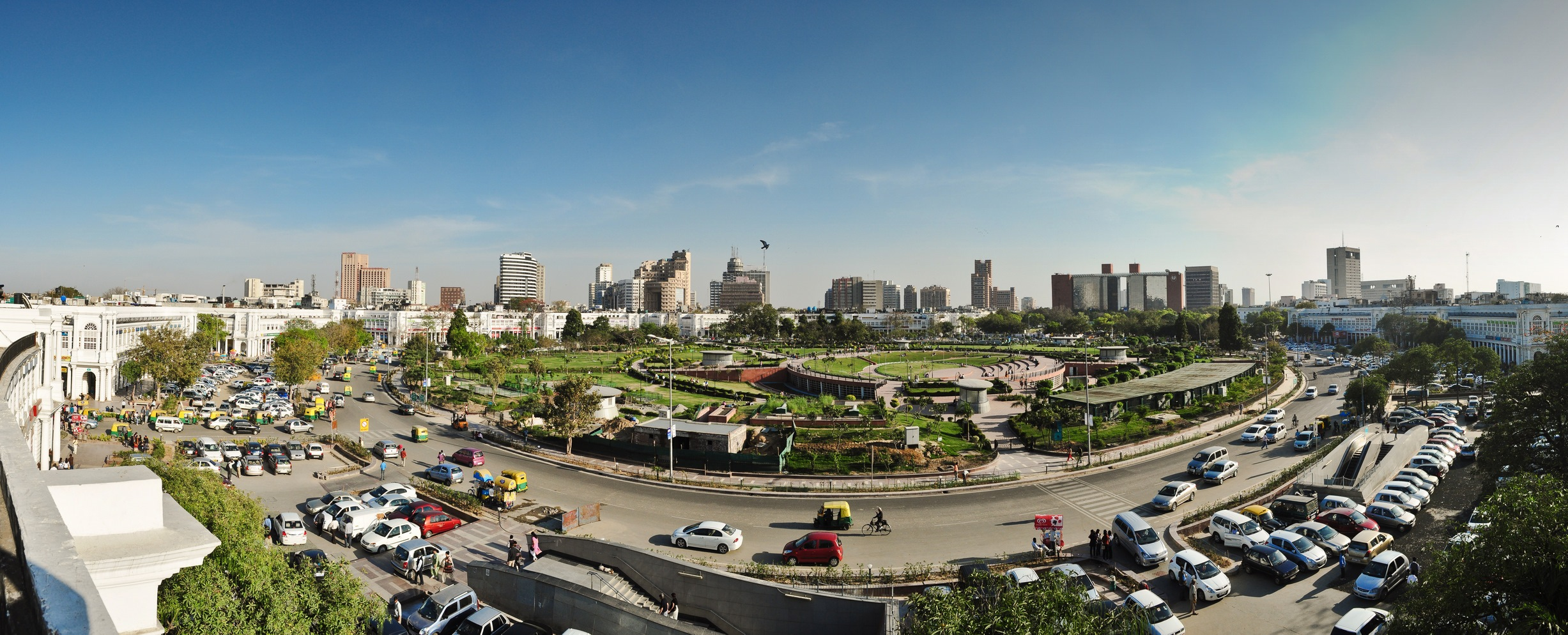
- Panoramic view of the inner circle and central park in Connaught Place
- Nickname: CP
- Location in New Delhi, India
- Coordinates: 28°37′58″N 77°13′11″E
- Country: India
- Union Territory: Delhi
- District: New Delhi
- Named for: Prince Arthur (Connaught Place); Rajiv Gandhi (Rajiv Chowk)

Government
  - Body: New Delhi Municipal Council
- Time zone: UTC+5:30 (IST)
- PIN: 110001
- Lok Sabha constituency: New Delhi
- Civic agency: NDMC
- Public transit: Blue Line Yellow Line; Rajiv Chowk

Connaught Place, also known as Rajiv Chowk, is one of the main financial, commercial and business centres in New Delhi, Delhi, India. It houses the headquarters of several noted Indian firms and is a major shopping, nightlife, and tourist destination in New Delhi. As of July 2018, Connaught Place ranked as the ninth most expensive office location in the world, with an annual rent of $1,650 per square metre ($153 per sq ft).

Connaught Place, considered the principal commercial hub of the new city, holds a place of pride and is recognized as one of the top heritage structures in New Delhi. Developed as a showpiece of Lutyens' Delhi, Connaught Place features a prominent Central Business District (CBD). Christened after Prince Arthur, 1st Duke of Connaught and Strathearn,it saw construction begin in 1929 and was completed in 1933. It was designed by Robert Tor Russell. Although Connaught Place was officially renamed in 1995 after former Prime Minister Rajiv Gandhi, the term "Rajiv Chowk" is seldom used, with locals and officials alike continuing to refer to it as Connaught Place.

An underground Delhi Metro station built beneath Connaught Place is named Rajiv Chowk.

== History ==
In the centuries preceding the construction of Connaught Place, the area encompassing Connaught Place was a ridge, covered with kikar trees and populated with jackals and wild pigs. Residents of Kashmere Gate and Civil Lines paid visits to the area during the weekends for partridge hunting. The Hanuman temple attracted many visitors from the old walled city, who visited only on Tuesdays and Saturdays and before sunset, as the return trip was considered dangerous.

Residents of villages including Madhoganj, Jaisingh Pura and Raja ka Bazaar were evicted to clear the area for the construction of Connaught Place and the development of its nearby areas in the early twentieth century. The villages once straddled the historic Qutb Road, the primary route connecting Shahjahanabad, the walled city of Delhi (now Old Delhi), to Qutb Minar, on Delhi's southern edge, since the Mughal era. The displaced people were relocated to Karol Bagh to the west, a rocky region that had previously been populated only by trees and wild bushes. However, three structures were spared demolition. These comprised the Hanuman temple, a Jain temple in Jaisingh Pura, and the Jantar Mantar.

=== Construction ===
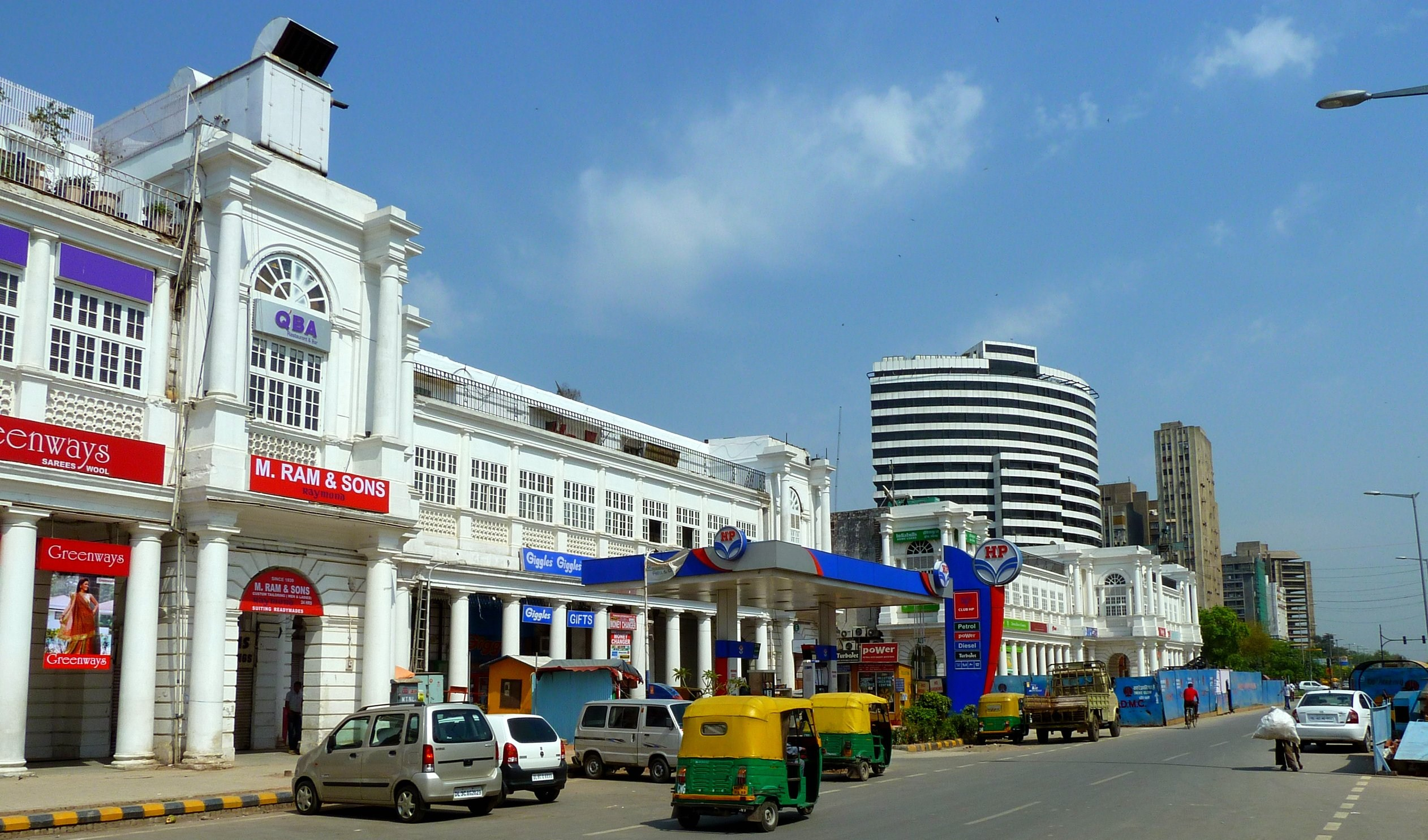
Robert Tor Russell was the architect of Connaught Place

Plans for the development of a central business district took shape as the construction of the new capital of British India began to gather traction. Headed by W.H. Nicholls, the chief architect to the Government of British India, the plans featured a central plaza based on the European Renaissance and in the Classical style. However, Nicholls left India in 1917, and with Lutyens and Baker preoccupied with the construction of larger buildings in the capital, the design of the plaza was eventually entrusted to Robert Tor Russell, chief architect of the Public Works Department (PWD), Government of India, who collaborated with Sobha Singh in the construction of New Delhi.

Originally barren and arid, the area saw its first development with the construction of Sujan Singh Block A (now Wenger’s Block), followed by Blocks B and C, then Scindia House block, Regal Building, Rivoli Cinema, and the American Express block. These properties were built and privately owned by Sobha Singh as the British Government aimed to ensure Delhi had a blend of official and private spaces. Subsequently, Sardar Bahadur Dharam Singh Sethi and Sardar Bahadur Narain Singh of Akoi joined in developing the area, constructing buildings such as the Odeon Cinema and structures on the southern side.

Connaught Place was named after Prince Arthur, the 1st Duke of Connaught (1850–1942), the third son of Queen Victoria and uncle of King George VI. Prince Arthur visited India in 1921 and laid the foundation of the Council House (now Sansad Bhavan, or Parliament House). In 2013, Connaught Place was renamed Rajiv Chowk, in honor of former Prime Minister Rajiv Gandhi.

Connaught Place's Georgian architecture is modelled after the Royal Crescent in Bath, designed by the architect John Wood the Younger and built between 1767 and 1774. While the Royal Crescent is semi-circular and a three-storied residential structure, Connaught Place consists of two floors, which made almost a complete circle intended to house commercial establishments on the ground with residential space on the first floor. The circle was eventually designed with two concentric circles, creating an Inner Circle, Middle Circle and the Outer Circle with seven roads radiating from a circular central park known as Radial Roads- radiating from a circular central park. As per the original plan, the different blocks of Connaught Place were to be joined from above, employing archways, with radial roads below them. However, the circle was 'broken up' to give it a grander scale. Even the blocks were originally planned to be 172 metres (564 ft) in height but were later reduced to the present two-storied structure with an open colonnade.

Government plans to have New Delhi Railway Station built inside Central Park were rejected by railway authorities as they found the idea impractical, and instead, chose the nearby Paharganj area. Construction work began in 1929, with the Viceroy's House (now known as the Rashtrapati Bhavan, the seat of the President of India), Secretariat Building, Parliament House, and India Gate (previously known as the All-India War Memorial) completed by 1933, well after the city's inauguration in 1931.

=== Early years ===
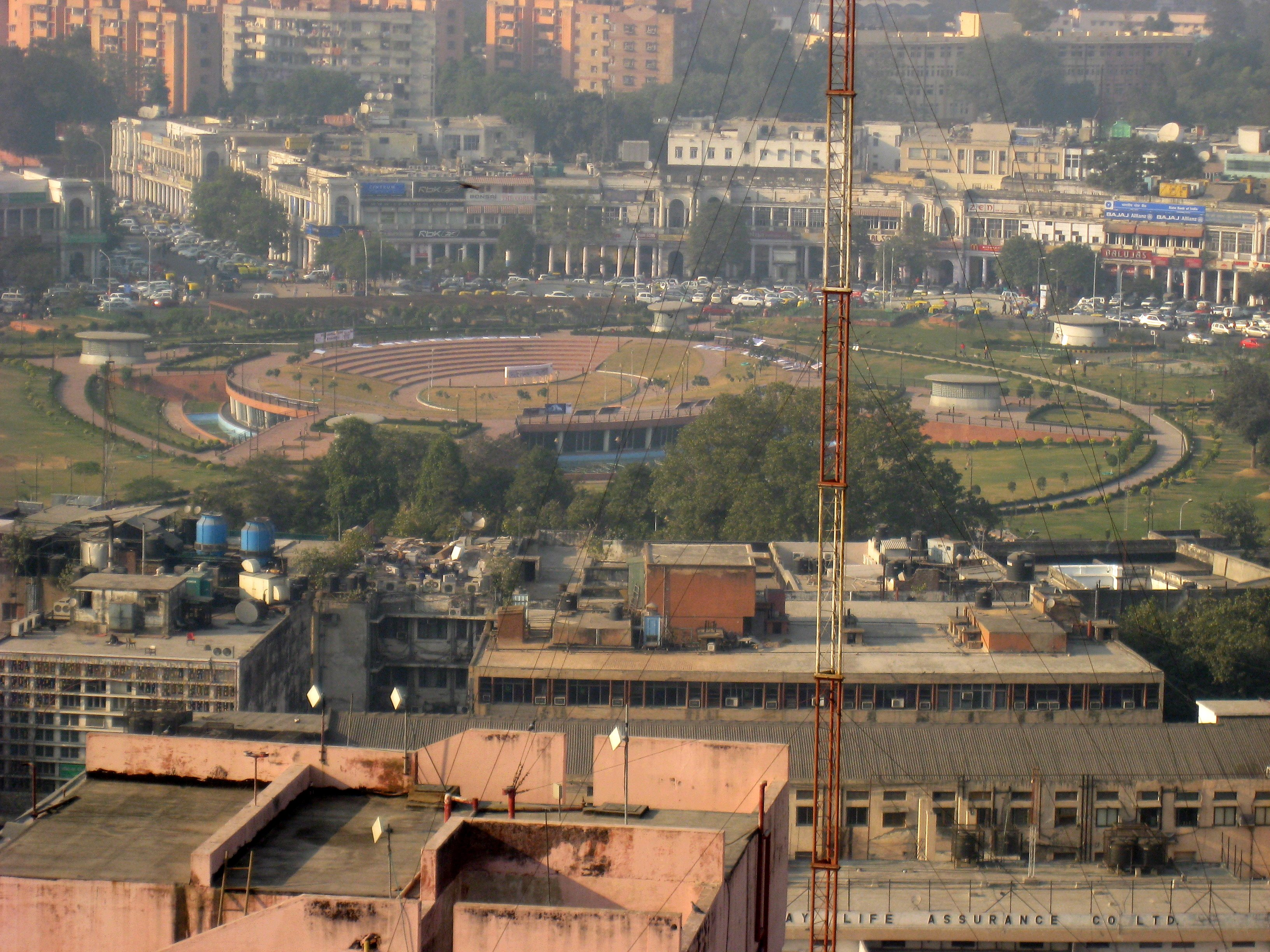
View of the Central Park and the inner circle of Connaught Place

Early commercial establishments belonged to traders from the Kashmere Gate area: Harnarain Gopinath (Harnarains), Kanter's, Galgotias, and Snowhite. Some of the other oldest and still-extant establishments include Ram Chandra & Sons (1935), Novex (1937), Dhoomi Mal Gallery (1936), Vaish at Rivoli (1939), Indian Arts Palace (1935), Mahatta & Company (1947).

Regal Cinema, the first cinema in Connaught Place, commenced operations around this time and went on to host popular concerts, theatre groups, and ballet performances. The Odeon and Rivoli followed the Regal, while the Indian Talkie House opened in 1938. Initially, only Indian snacks were available in the area; gradually, restaurants opened in the plaza, with outlets like Kwality, United Coffee House and others offering Continental and Mughlai cuisines.

Wenger's, the confectioners, was one of the first shops in Connaught Place. The firm also owned New Delhi's largest restaurant, located on the first floor of its current A-Block outlet. Originally established in 1926 as Spencers in Kashmere Gate, Wenger's was owned by a Swiss couple and introduced Delhi to pastries and homemade Swiss chocolates. In its early years, it was primarily patronized by British officers, Indian royalty, and a few businessmen with international exposure, as Delhi remained a city of classical taste within the walled city. Over the years, Wenger's opened another shop adjacent to their original location in Connaught Place's A Block. This space had previously belonged to Harnarains, a food processing brand established in the 1860s. Harnarains currently operates under the name Harnarains International. Davico's, located across Connaught Plaza, and the Standard restaurant were popular for decades before eventually fading away. Another long-standing establishment, the Embassy Restaurant, opened in 1948.

New Delhi's first luxury hotel, The Imperial, established in 1936 in Janpath, eventually became a haunt for the royalty and a place for political discussions. It was here that Jawaharlal Nehru, Mohandas K. Gandhi, Muhammad Ali Jinnah and Lord Mountbatten met to discuss the Partition of India and the birth of Pakistan.

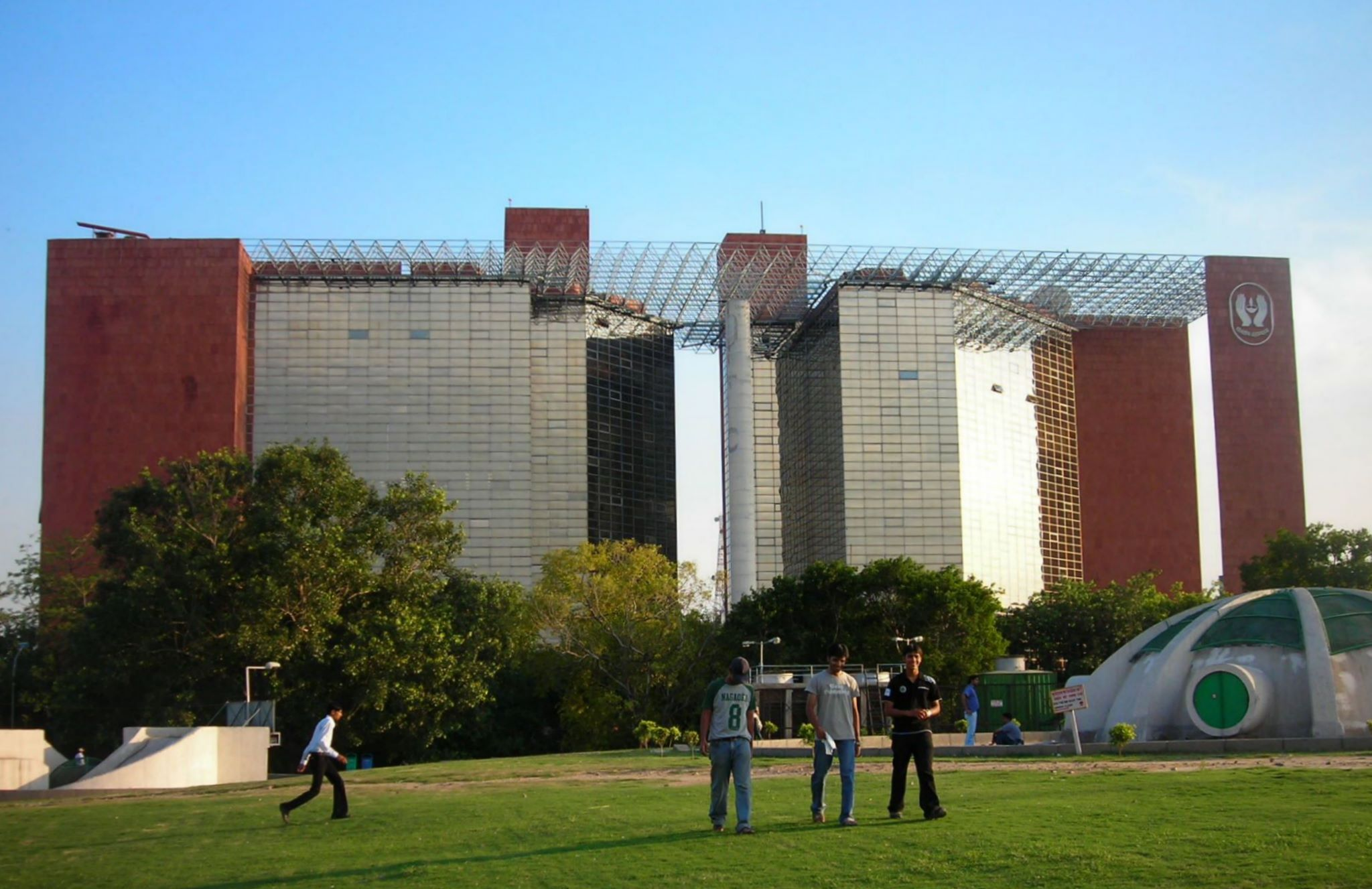
Jeevan Bharti, LIC building, Connaught Place, Outer Circle, built in 1986

Residents of Connaught Place gradually moved into the first-floor quarters, which were nearly fully occupied by 1938. However, it took another decade for the plaza to transform into the bustling marketplace it would later become, as World War II began and the Indian independence movement intensified and reached a feverish pitch. Markets experienced dwindling sales, but post-independence business began to burgeon in the 1950s.

=== Post-independence ===
Until the 1980s, the Phatphat Sewa, a Harley Davidson rickshaw service, took visitors from Connaught Place to the Red Fort and Chandani Chowk, before it ceased operations due to pollution concerns. The empty block of the Inner Circle came into use in the late 1970s with the construction of an underground market, the first in Delhi, Palika Bazaar, at the junction point. Stretching up to the Outer Circle, it also came with an adjoining underground parking lot. Concurrently, the State Emporiums on Baba Kharak Singh Marg radial emerged. However, a major alteration in the skyline was the development of a skyscraper comprising red sandstone (inspired by the historic Red Fort) and glass, the Jeevan Bharti building (owned by the LIC), which was designed by architect Charles Correa. In 1986, it towered over the low-lying, predominantly white Connaught Place and faced criticism for being too futuristic. However, as other skyscrapers were gradually built on the periphery, the debate faded away.

== Cinemas ==
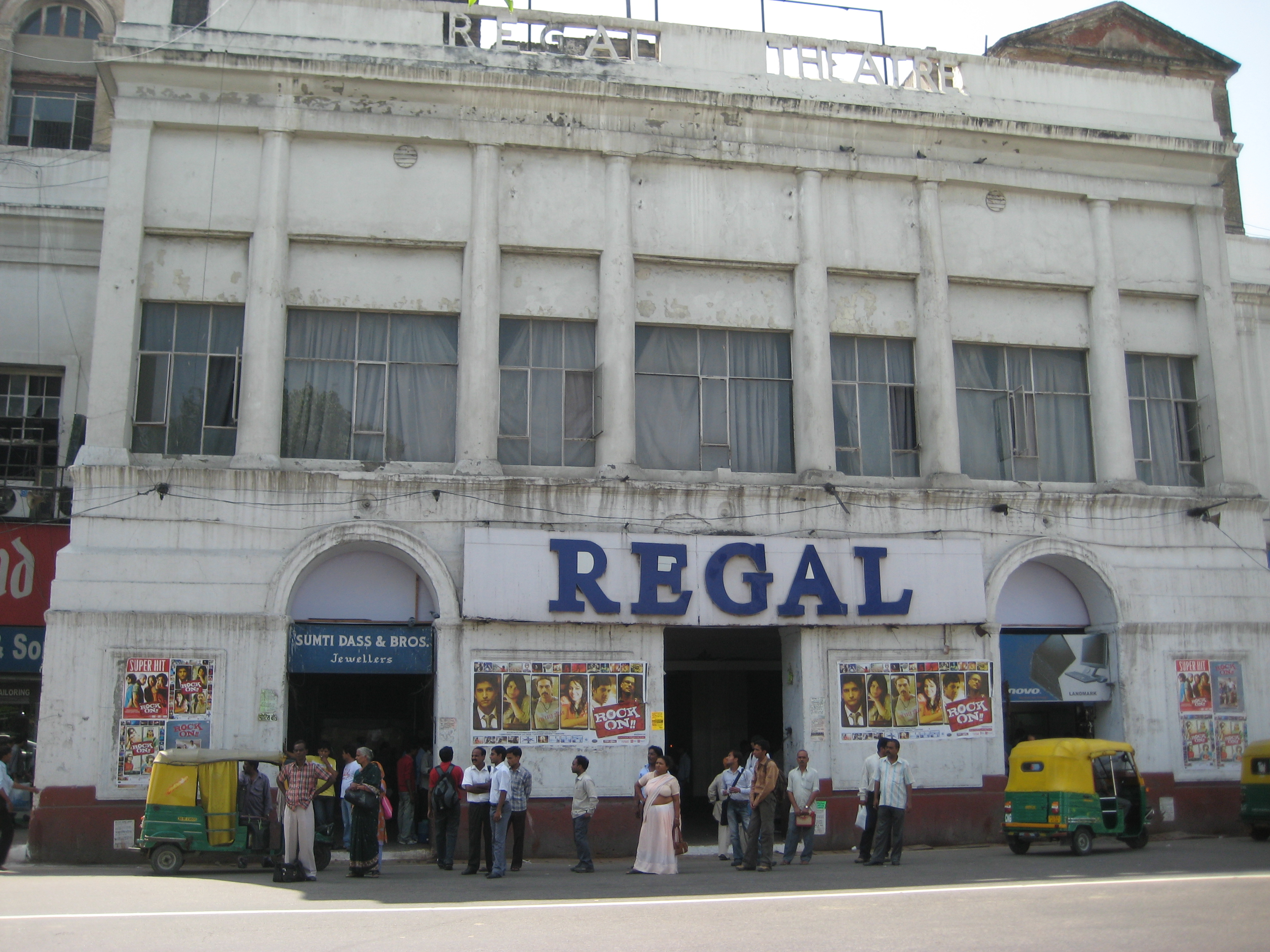
Regal Cinema, Connaught Place's first theatre, opened in 1932 and was designed by Walter Sykes George

With the introduction of talkies to Indian cinema in 1931, the new medium quickly gained immense popularity. In the 1930s and 1940s, four theaters opened within Connaught Place Plaza: Regal, Rivoli, Odeon, and the short-lived "Indian Talkie House," which opened in 1938.

Connaught Place sprouted as the entertainment hub of New Delhi. The Regal, the first theatre in the area, was opened in 1932 by Sir Sobha Singh. It was designed by architect Walter Sykes George and mainly hosted stage performances. In the coming years it hosted Western Classical music artists, Russian ballet and British theatre groups, and soon started morning and afternoon movie shows. The next theatre to be built was the Plaza in 1940, designed by Sir Robert Tor Russell, the architect of Connaught Place itself. It was owned by director and actor Sohrab Modi until the early 1950s.

The Odeon was built in 1945 and had the city's second 70mm screen after the "Shiela Cinema" in Paharganj. The Rivoli, close to the Regal, was the smallest theatre in the area. Half a century later, while the vast majority of the theatres were still running, most changed ownership. The Plaza and Rivoli are now owned by multiplex giant PVR INOX Cinemas, while the Odeon runs as a joint venture with Reliance Big Pictures.

== Today ==
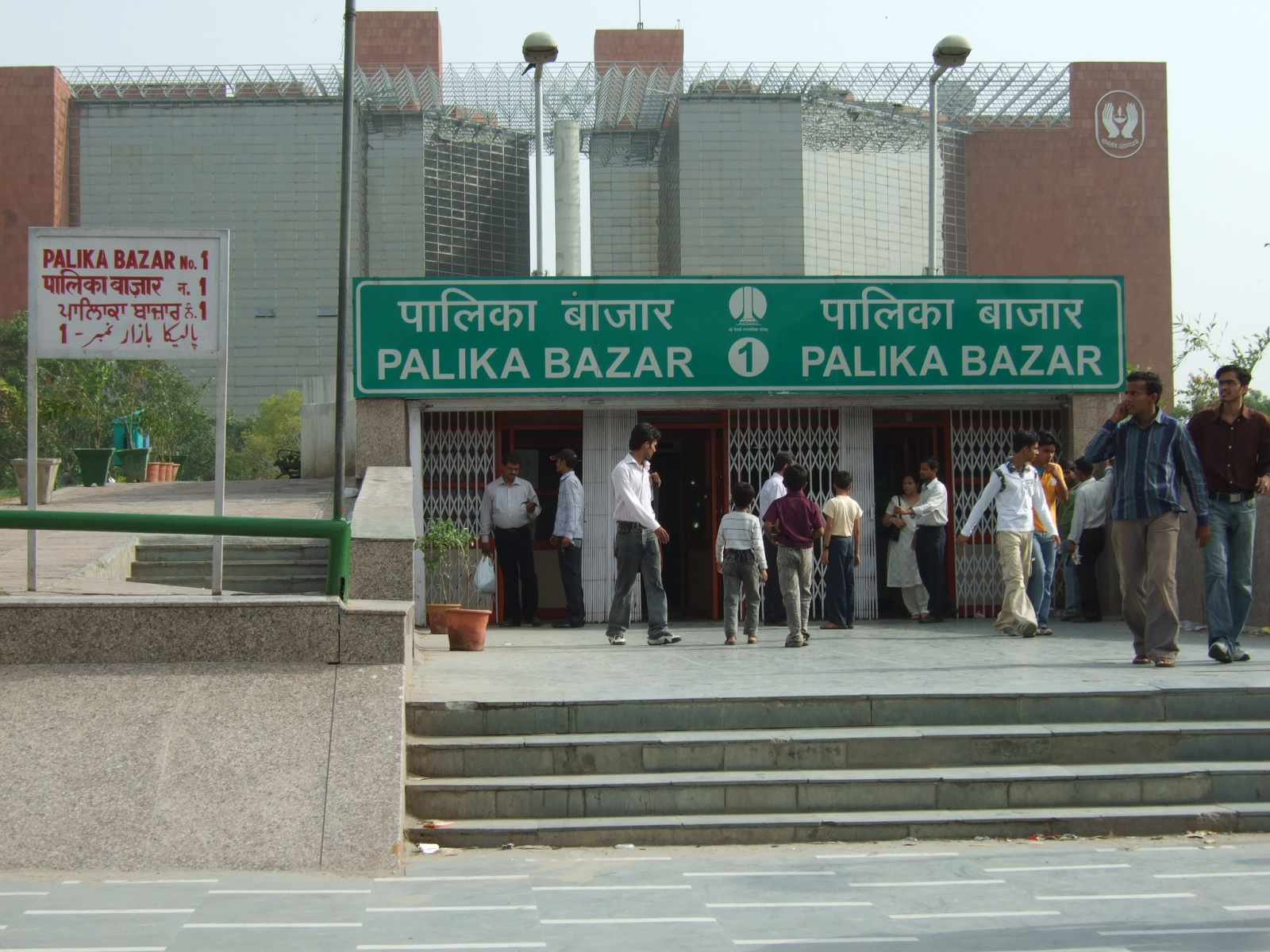
Entrance of the underground shopping complex, Palika Bazaar, which was constructed in the 1970s

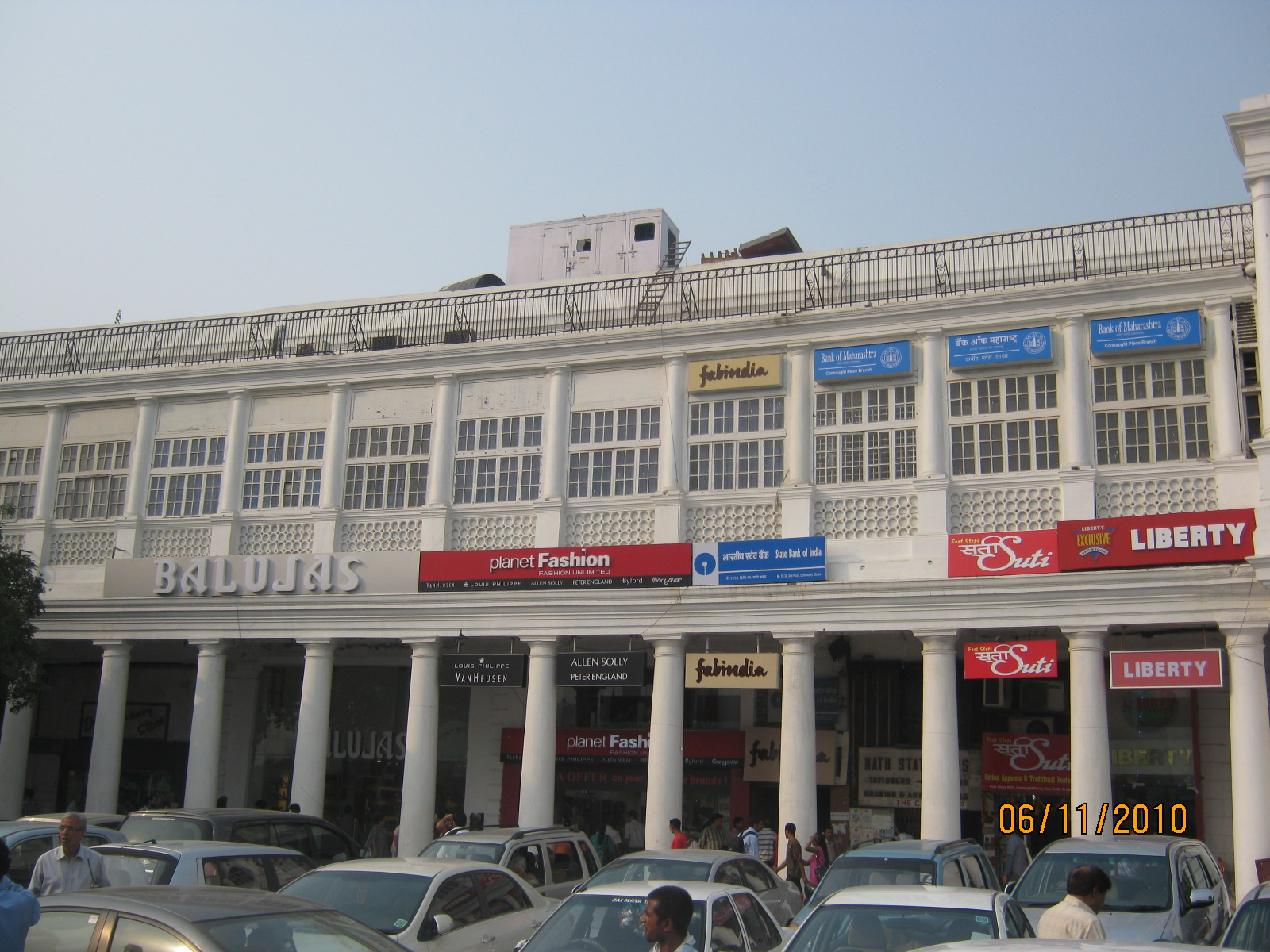
Connaught Place on a busy weekend

The area is instantly recognisable on any map of Delhi as a giant circle in the middle with radial roads beaming in all directions. Eight separate roads extend from Connaught Place's inner circle, named Parliament Street and Radial Roads 1 through 7. Twelve different roads lead out from Connaught Circus, the outer ring. The best known of these is Janpath, the continuation of Radial Road 1. Connaught Place is a logically planned area and is home to one of India’s first underground markets, the Palika Bazaar (Municipal Market), named after the Hindi term "nagarpalika" (municipal council).

The Outer Circle, known as Connaught Circus (officially Indira Chowk), consists of rows of restaurants, shops, and hotels. On December 1, 2017, the historic Regal Building was reopened as Madame Tussauds Wax Museum, the first of its kind in India.The Middle Circle houses offices, banks, exchange facilities like Thomas Cook and ATW Exchange, a PVR theatre complex, and various dining outlets.

=== Central Park ===
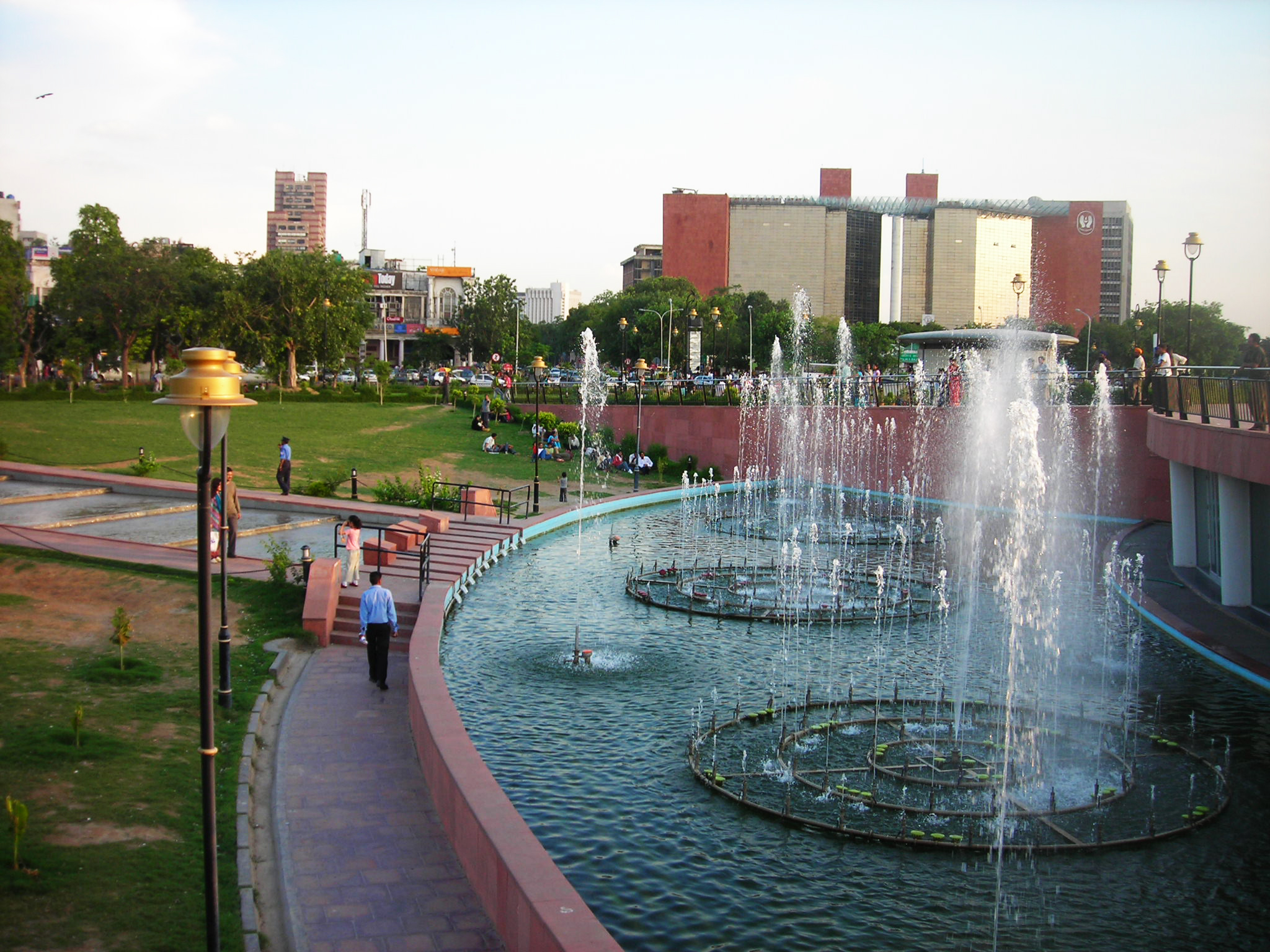
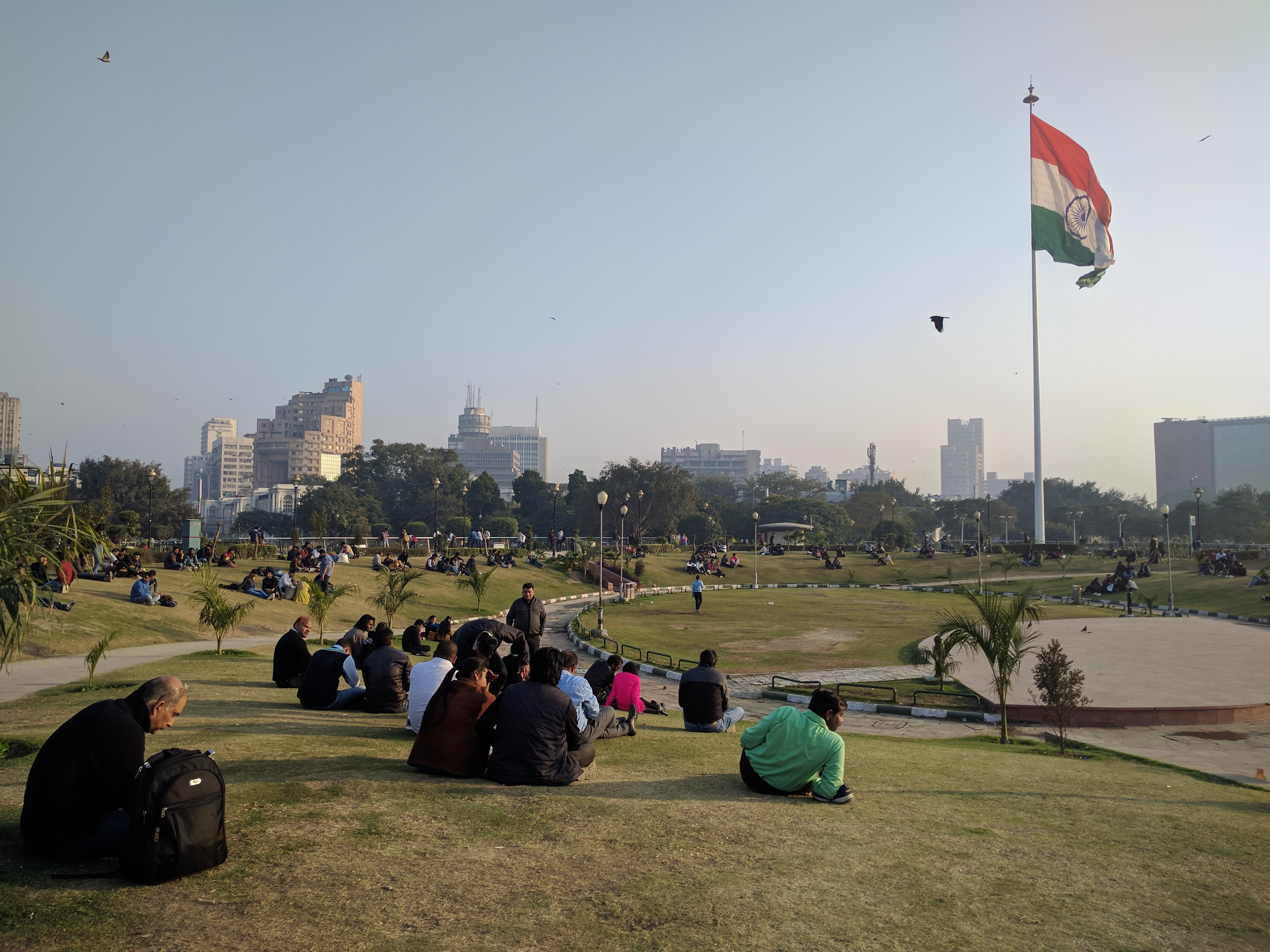
Central Park, Connaught Place

The Central Park of Connaught Place has gained a reputation for hosting cultural events and is regarded as one of the city's top local hangouts. In 2005–06, Central Park was rebuilt following the construction of the Delhi Metro station beneath it. This station, Rajiv Chowk, serves as an interchange for the Yellow and Blue lines and is one of the largest and busiest stations in the network.

Connaught Place hosts various cultural events in the Central Park area such as the Urdu Heritage Festival, One Billion Rising demonstrations, Delhi Government's Youth Festival, Awam Ki Awaz (Voices of People) concert and many others.

=== National flag at Central Park ===
The first known Indian to hoist the tricolour flag at Connaught Place was Padma Shri Mir Mushtaq Ahmad, the first Chief Executive Councillor of Delhi. During the colonial era, when Connaught Place was seen as the heart of British imperial India, he would annually hoist the tricolour at the bandstand in Central Park on January 26. On March 7, 2014, the largest Indian national tricolour at that time (now the second largest) was erected at the centre of Central Park, measuring 90 by 60 feet (27 by 18 m), on a 207-foot (63 m) pole.

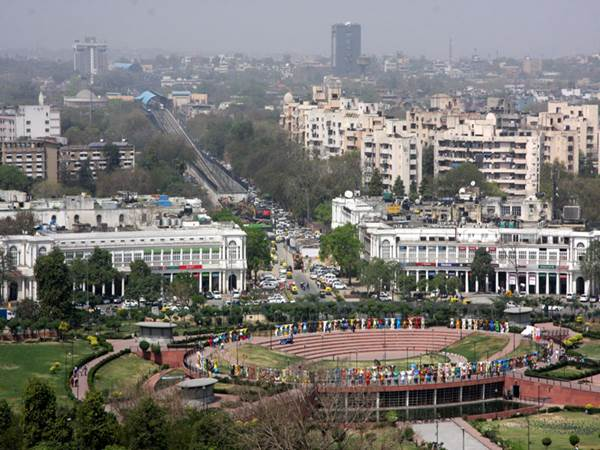
In 2012, the United Buddy Bears exhibition attracted more than 1 million visitors at Connaught Place

== Delhi blasts ==
Two of the five terrorist blasts that occurred during the 13 September 2008 Delhi bombings were in Connaught Place. Ten people were injured; police and witnesses said that the bombs went off in garbage cans in and around Connaught Place. Another explosion occurred in the nearby Central Park. Authorities also discovered two undetonated bombs in Delhi, one of which was found at the Regal Cinema complex in Connaught Place. As a response, all trashcans were removed from the area.

== Redevelopment plans ==
Redevelopment work to revamp Connaught Place ahead of the 2010 Commonwealth Games was slated for timely completion; however, owing to huge cost overruns and undue delays, this deadline was not met. The performance audit report prepared by Comptroller and Auditor General of India on the Games concluded that there were "significant deficiencies in contract management, with consequent avoidable expenditure". Moreover, the mis-management and delays caused great inconvenience to shoppers and shop-owners alike, and led to a decline in trade. Many outlet proprietors complained of erratic power supplies and lost air-conditioning in their shops during the renovation work.

Another spate of renovation work on Connaught Place resumed shortly after the Commonwealth Games, with an initial completion target of December 2012. However, by 2016, only the first phase—renovation of Blocks A and B—had been completed. The plan aimed to restore all six blocks of Connaught Place to their former grandeur by 2020, although delays have affected the timeline.

On 5 January 2017, the Union Urban Development Ministry announced a plan to convert the middle and inner circles of Connaught Place, into an exclusive pedestrian zone, starting February 2017. Under the auspices of the proposal, people driving into the area would have to park their vehicles at designated parking slots located at Shivaji Stadium and Palika Bazaar and subsequently proceed either on foot to Connaught Place or use the shuttle bus service. However, bicycles would have been allowed in the pedestrian zones. The plan was eventually scrapped as it was determined that the then-extant public infrastructure was incapable of sustaining the pedestrianisation proposal.

By late 2020, Connaught Place had experienced a decline in its former grandeur, though it continued to attract visitors. In response, the New Delhi Municipal Council (NDMC) initiated several redevelopment projects to restore and enhance this iconic Delhi landmark. The plan included the provision of heritage sensitive signage, engineering improvements of roads, drainage sewerage, water supply and substations, development of a traffic management plan, provisions of street furniture including adequate parking, walkways etc. and enhancing the structural stability of all buildings including retrofitting for earthquake resistance. All these components have been identified based on studies conducted by various agencies such as SPA, RITES, CMCCC, and NTPAC, etc.

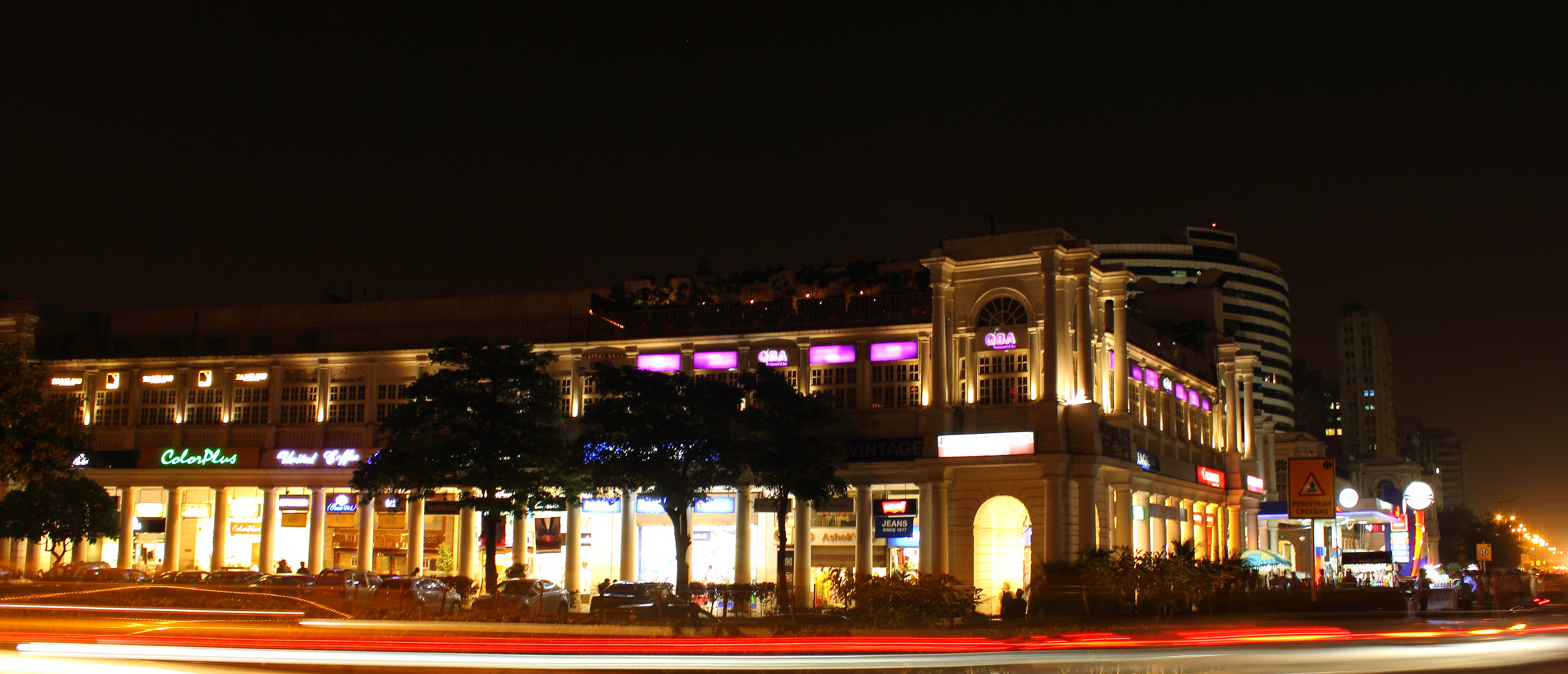
Connaught Place at night

== Films ==
Over the years, Connaught Place has been the location of many films including sequences in Dil Se.. (1998), Hazaaron Khwaishein Aisi (2003), Pyaar Ke Side Effects (2006), Sunday (2008), 3 Idiots (2009), Aisha (2010), Delhi Belly (2011), Rockstar (2011), Ahista Ahista (2006), Agent Vinod, Vicky Donor (2012), Hate Story (2011), Special 26 (2013), A Wednesday (2008), Rang De Basanti (2006), PK (2014) and 2 States (2014).

== Visitor attractions ==
- Agrasen's Baoli, Connaught Place
- The Imperial, New Delhi
- National Philatelic Museum, New Delhi
- Madame Tussauds Delhi
- Jantar Mantar, Delhi

== Nearby areas ==
- Barakhamba Road and Kasturba Gandhi Marg: Hubs for prominent international banks and corporate offices.
- Janpath and Baba Kharak Singh Marg: A popular shopping area for local Indian handicrafts, with many small shops offering a variety of traditional crafts.
- Parliament Street: A hub for government offices, with Jantar Mantar and the headquarters of the NDMC located along this major road.
- New Delhi railway station on the Indian Railways network.
- Lady Hardinge Medical College
- Babar Road and Bengali Market: the solitary residential areas in the vicinity of Connaught Place.

== Picture gallery ==
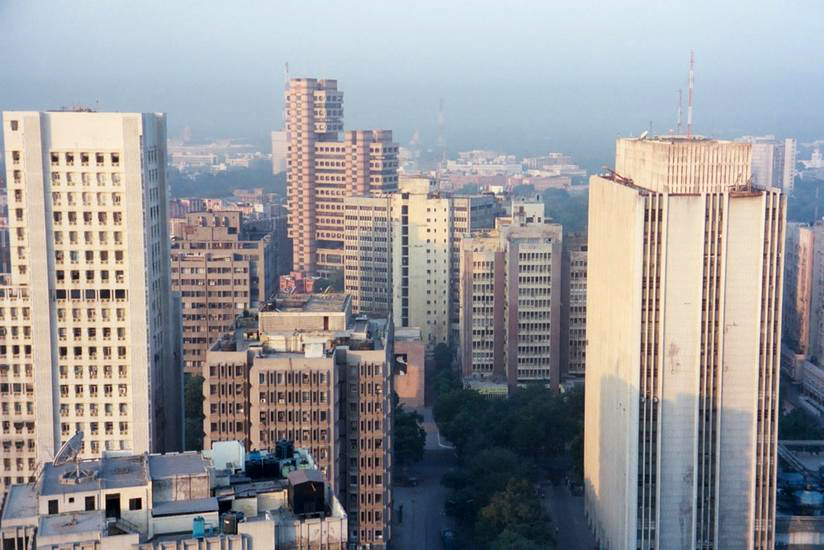
Skyscrapers at Connaught Place

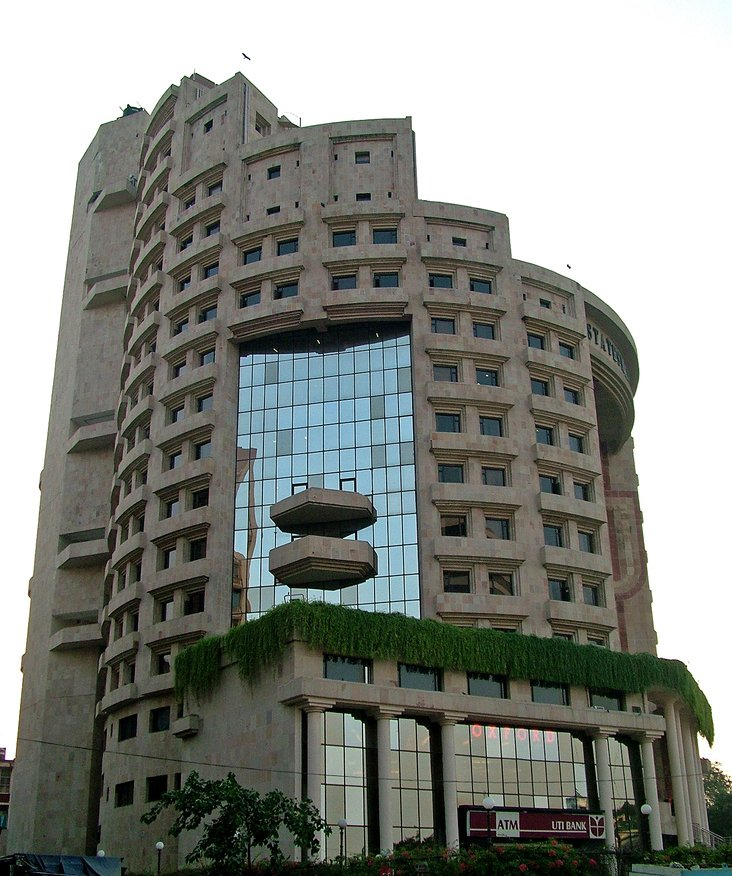
The Statesman Building

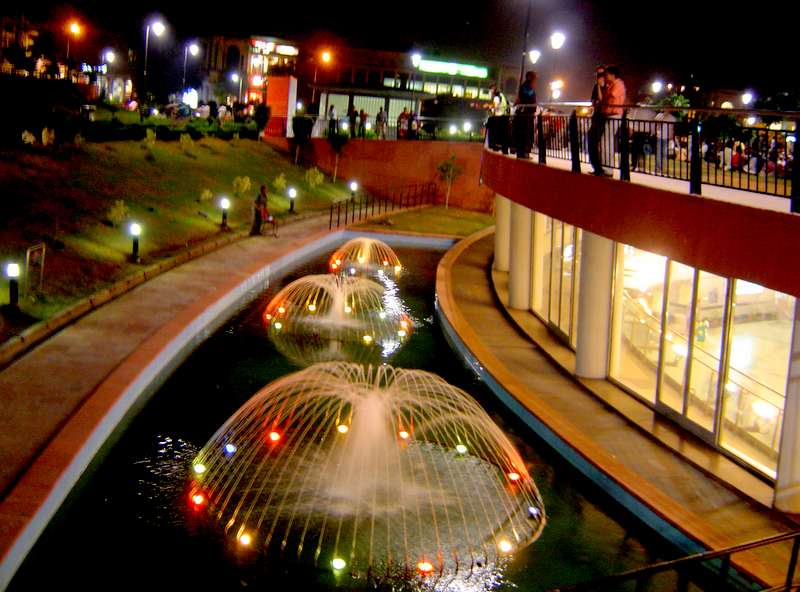
Central Park

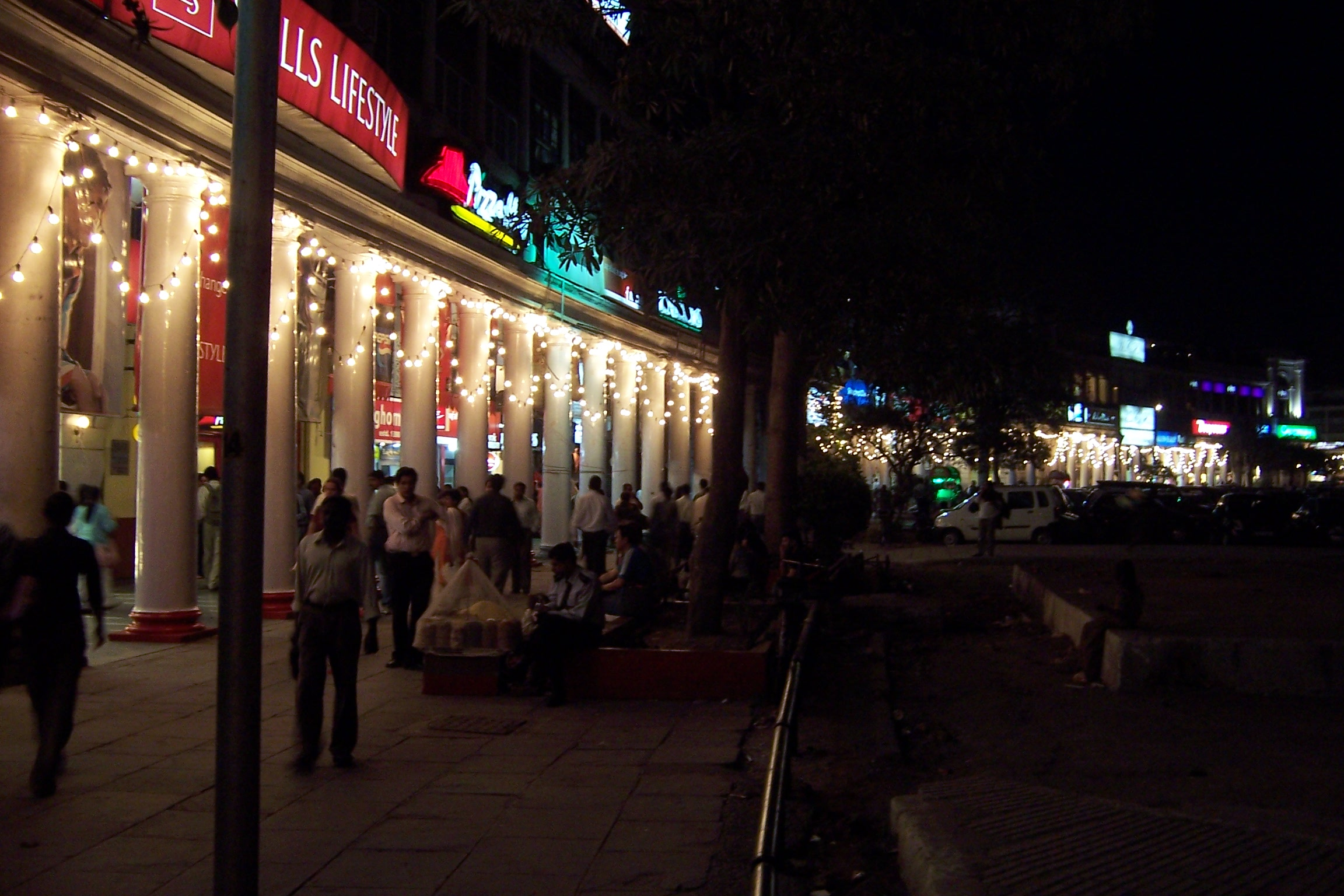
Shops along the innermost Connaught Circle at night in early 2006

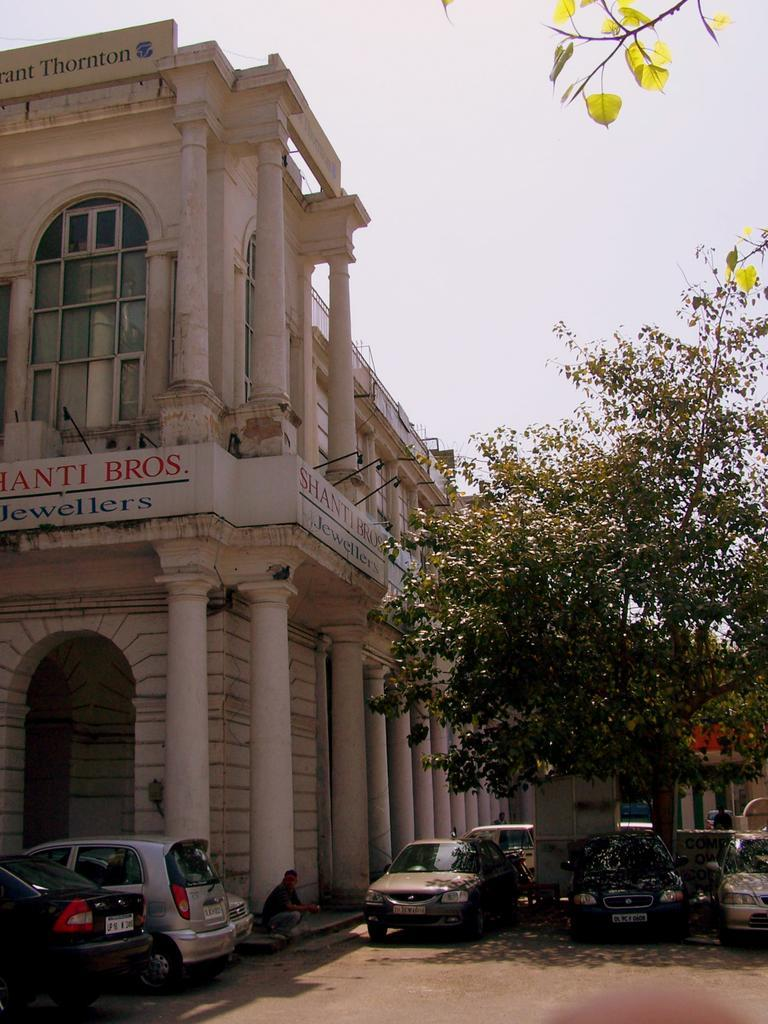
Georgian architecture of Connaught Place

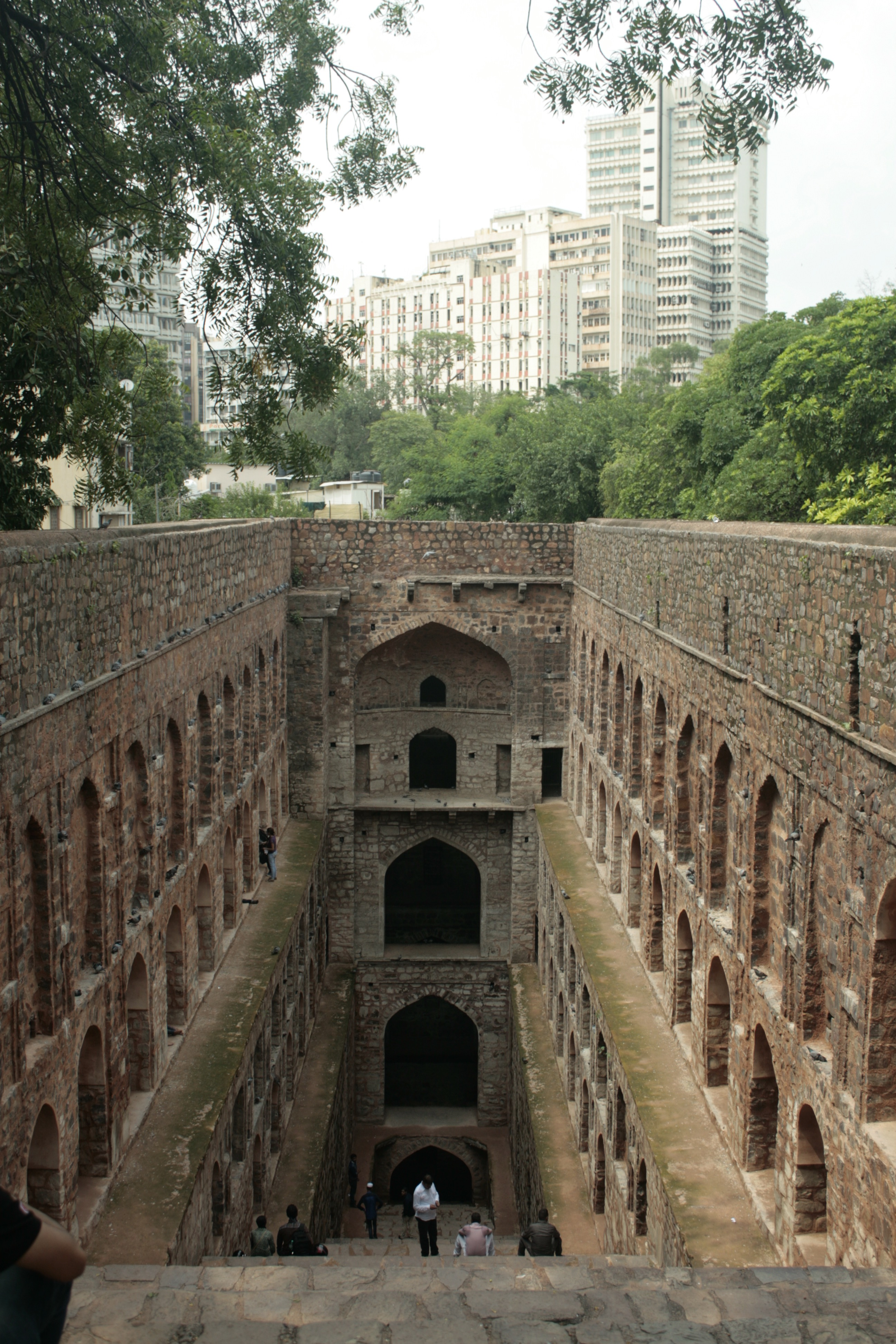
The medieval Agrasen ki Baoli is tucked amidst the skyscrapers of Connaught Place

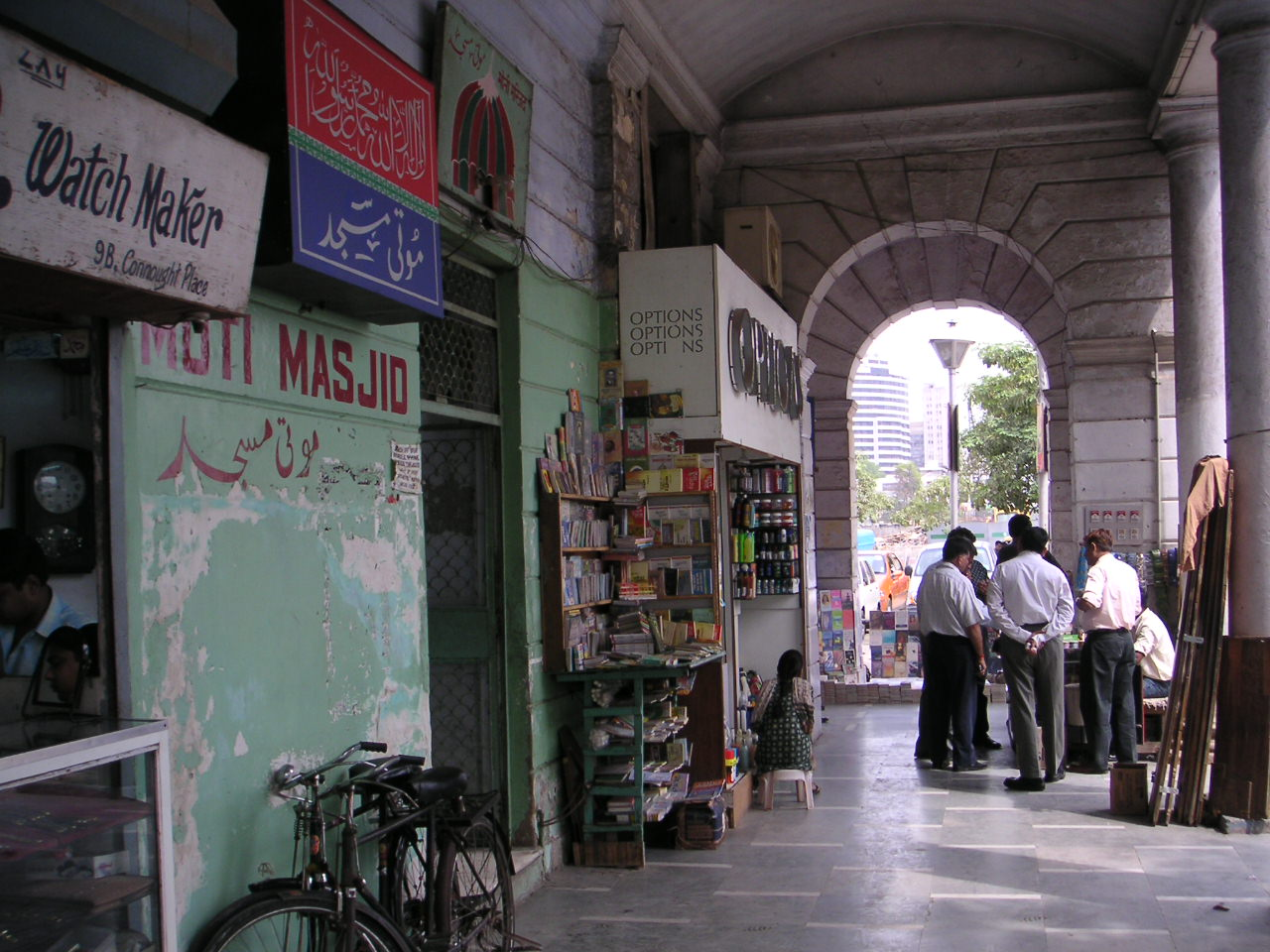
A mosque in the inner circle

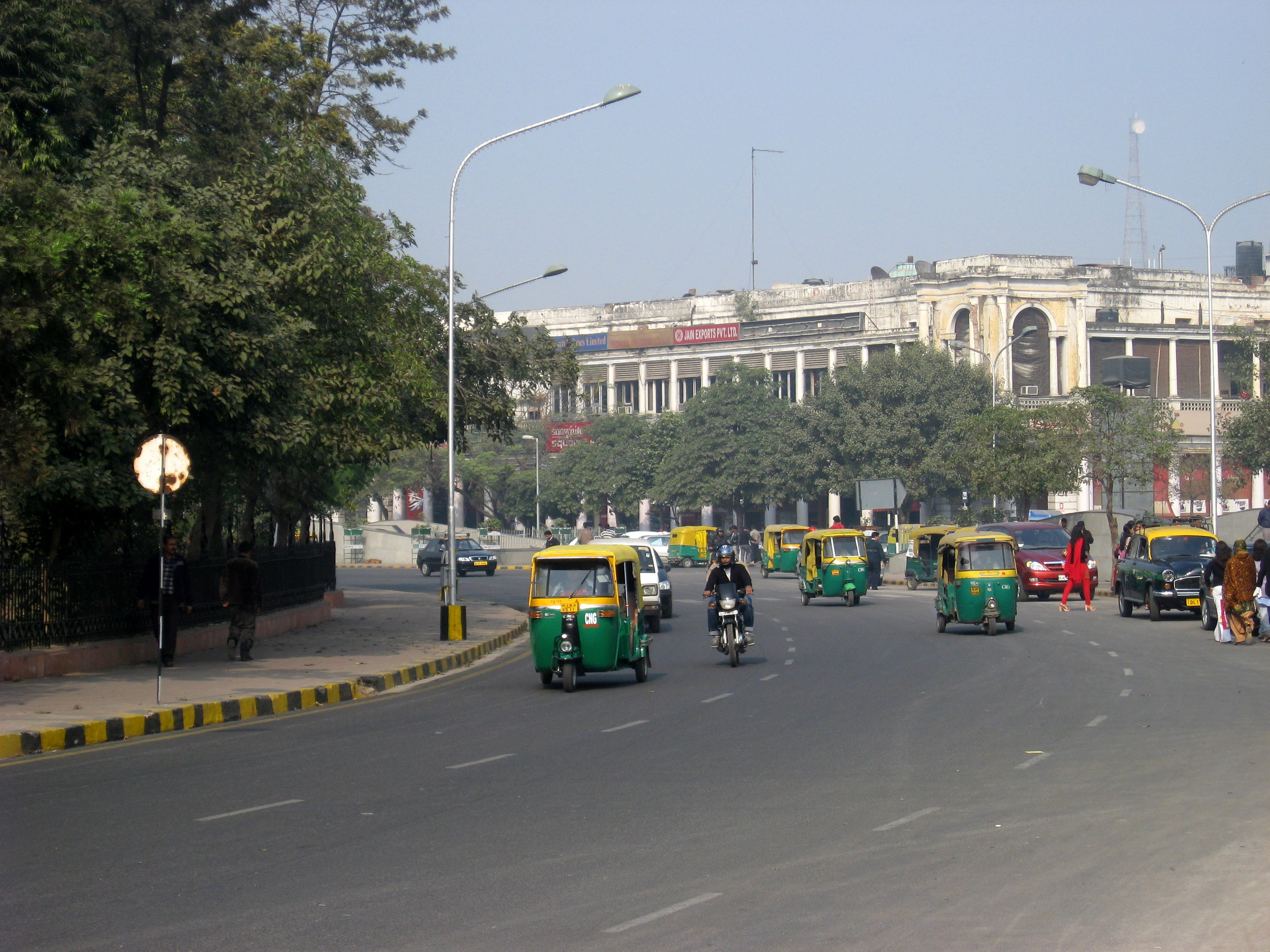
Inner circle

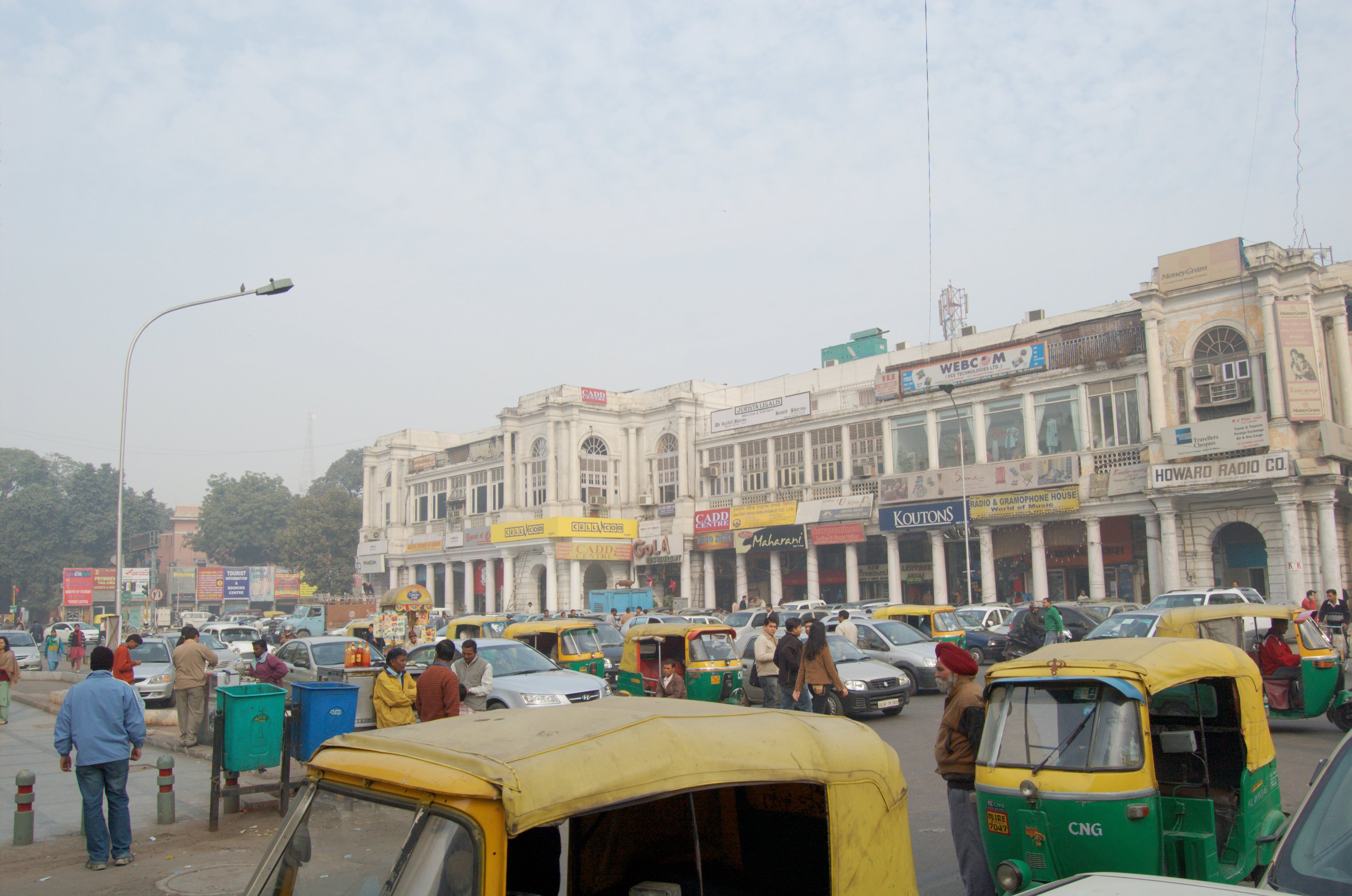
On one of the spokes

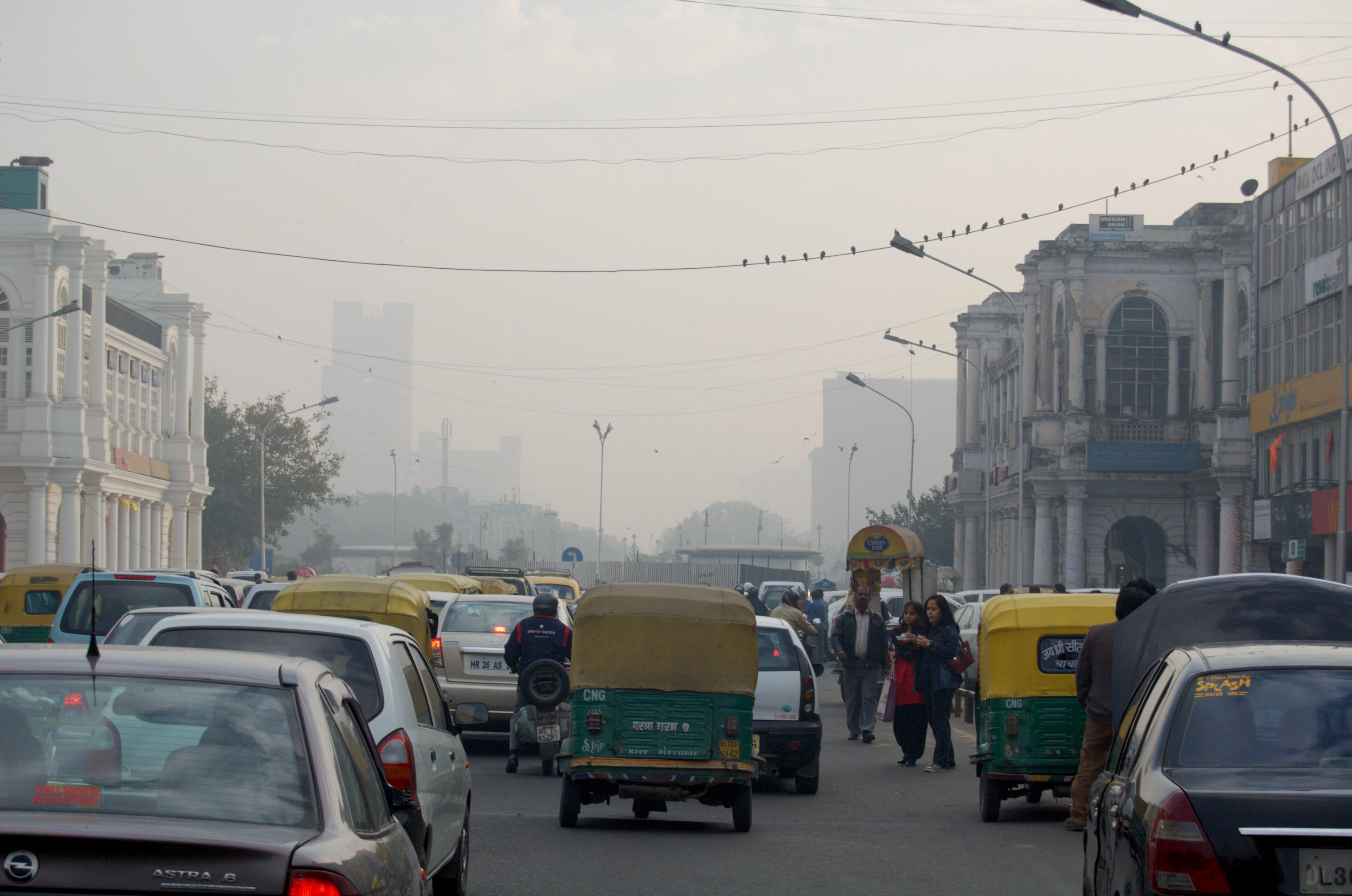
One of the radial roads

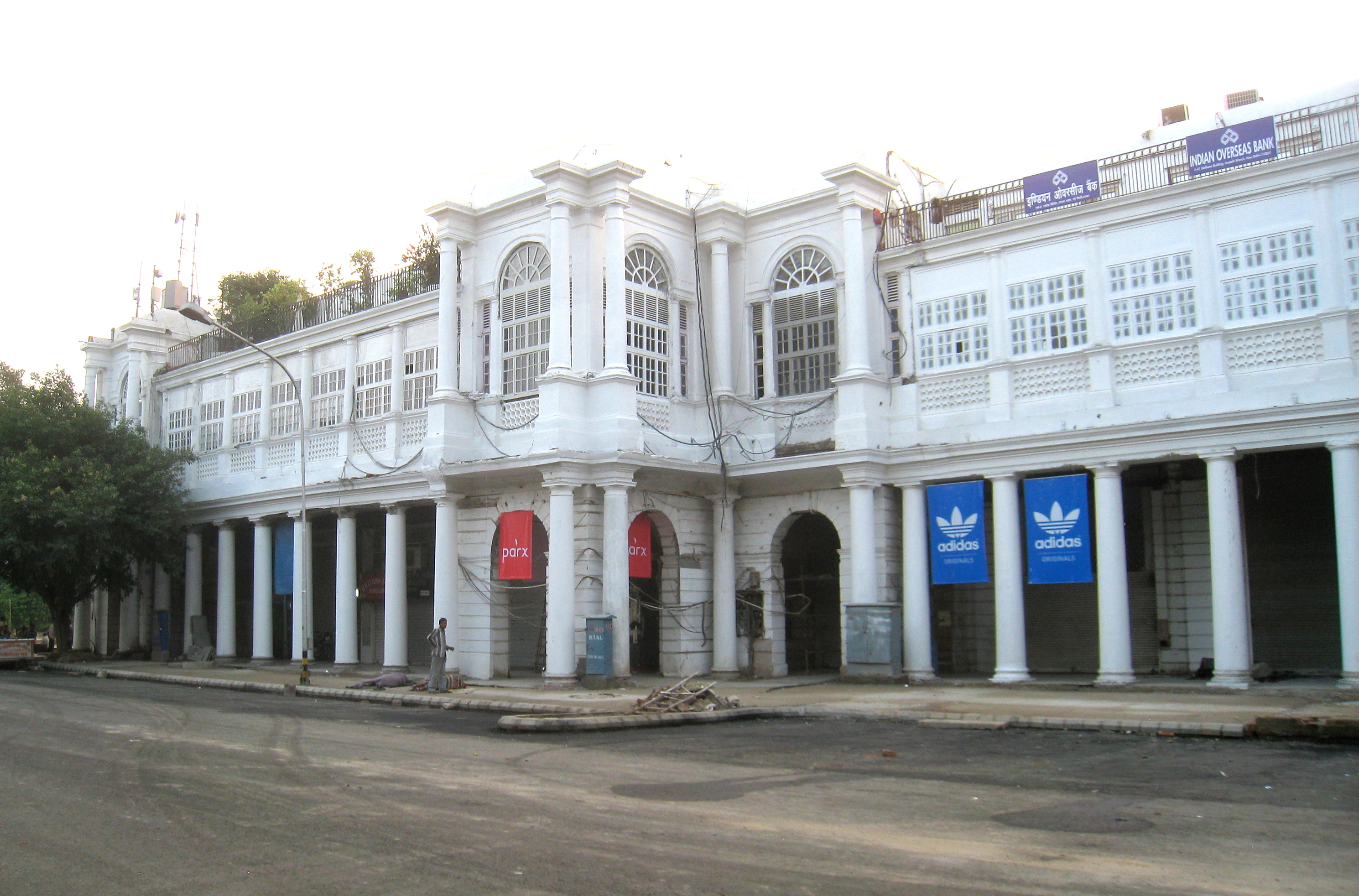
Connaught Place

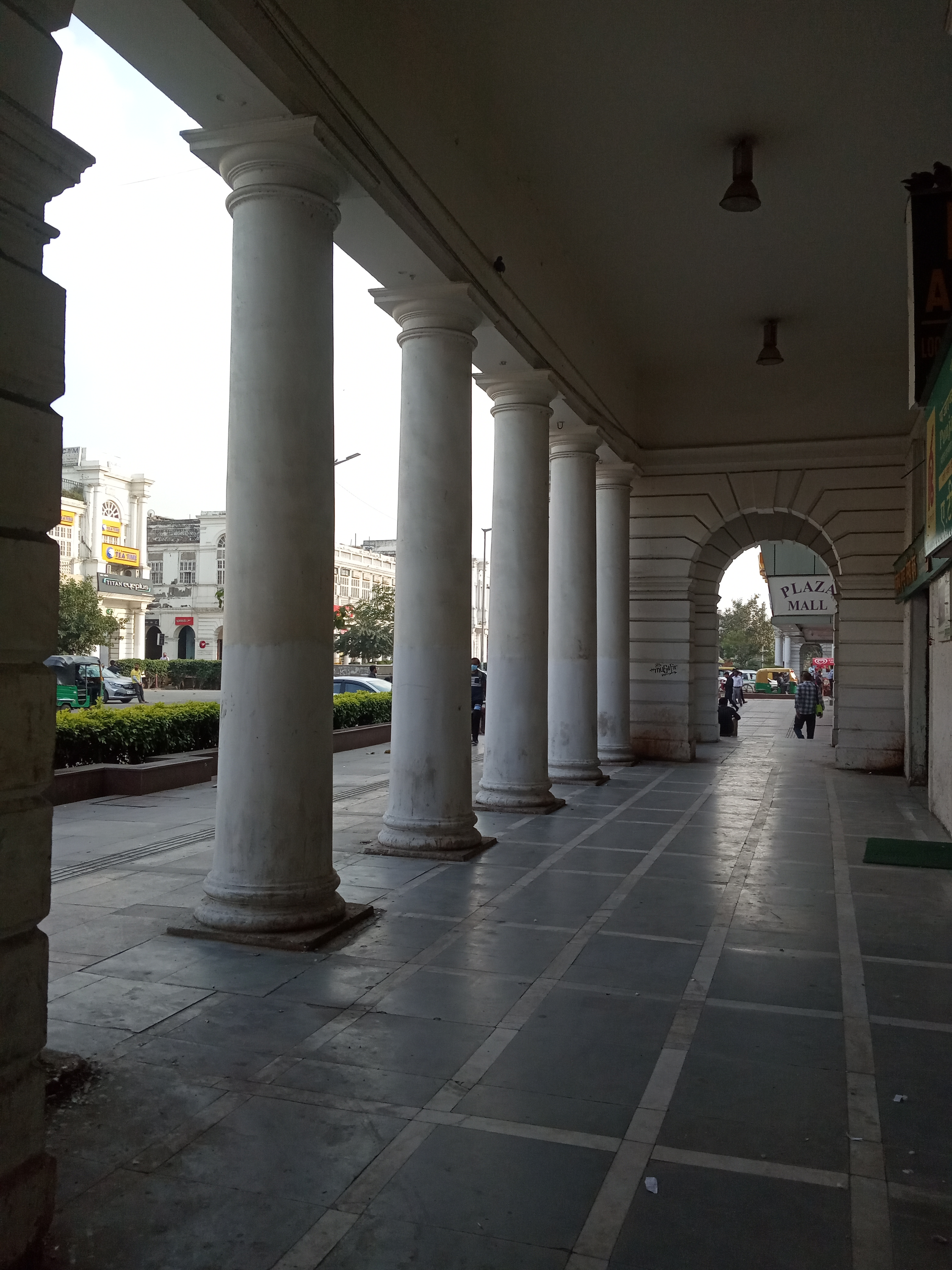
Deserted section of the H block in March 2020

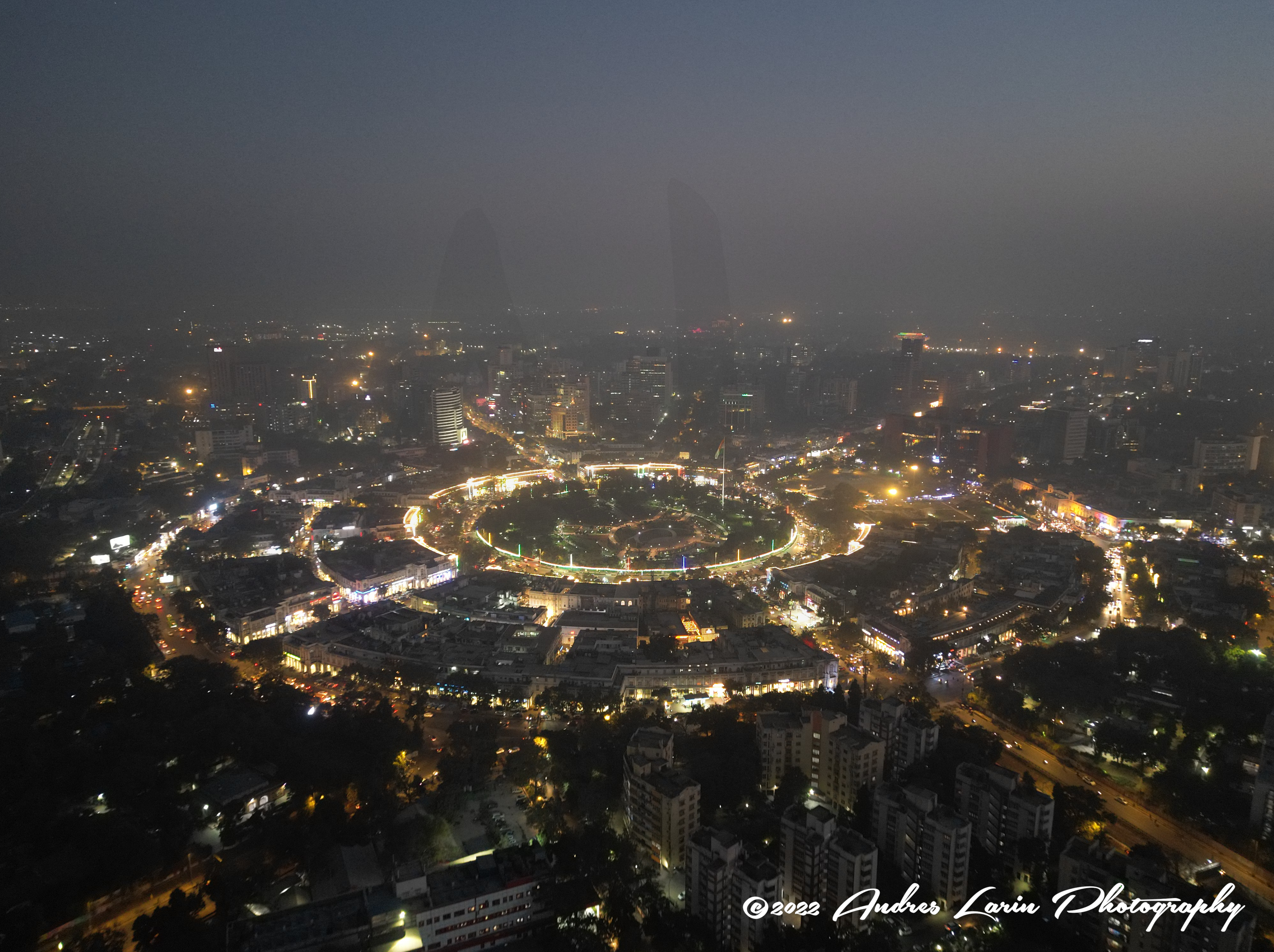
Aerial view of Connaught Place, 2023

== See also ==
- Janakpuri
- Nehru Place
- Rajendra Place
- Shivaji Place
- Greater Kailash
- South Extension
- List of parks in Delhi
