= Hemlata Gupta =

Indian doctor

- Born: 25 June 1943; Delhi
- Died: 13 May 2006 (aged 62)
- Occupations: Physician; Medical academic
- Known for: Medical academics
- Awards: Padma Bhushan

Hemlata Gupta (25 June 1943 – 13 May 2006) was an Indian medical doctor and the director and head of the department of medicine at Lady Hardinge Medical College. Gupta studied medicine at Lady Hardinge Medical College (Delhi University) where she later became a director. In 1998 the Government of India awarded Gupta the third highest civilian honour, the Padma Bhushan, for her contributions to medical science. She was unmarried and lived in New Delhi when she was found murdered on 13 May 2006 at her residence in Karol Bagh. After years of investigation, the case, which attracted media attention, remains unsolved.

== Medical contributions ==
Gupta and colleagues published a study in an Indian medical journal about a rare case tuberculosis in the thyroid. The article discusses the presentation of the patient, various tests used in diagnosis, a historical discussion of the case, and treatment methods.

== Padma Bhushan ==
The Padma awards are given out in India every year on Republic Day, usually in quantities less than 120. There are 3 classes of Padma awards, distinguishing the quality of service from distinguished to high order to exceptional. The Padma Bhushan is in the second category, recognizing public achievements of a high order in one's specified field. Awards are given in a variety of disciplines including art, civil service, sports, and literature. The public is able to make nominations and the Padma Awards Committee, Prime Minister, and President collaborate to make the final decision. The Awards Committee looks for life long achievement, public service, and excellence in their nominees. Hem Lata Gupta earned this prestigious award in 1998 in the medical category, receiving a certificate with the President's signature and a medallion.

== Murder ==
Police found Gupta dead in her Prasad Nagar apartment with her hands tied by rope, her mouth, nose, and eyes covered with surgical tape, and her throat cut. Neighbors reported seeing Gupta enter her apartment around 10:30 on the morning of her murder and seeing 2 male visitors present around the same time. Police arrived on the scene about an hour later, when neighbors seeking medical advice found her room unresponsive after extensive waiting. Possible links to her murder revolve around her name oddly appearing in a newspaper marriage advertisement and her apartment in Vasant Kunj. Police found Gupta's apartment to be under ownership of individuals with forged documentation. This case doesn't appear to be associated with robbery, as her jewelry collection and most of her possessions remained untouched, and remains unsolved by police.

== Investigation ==
Gupta was unmarried and lived alone in the flat following the death of her sister and father. Jewellery and cash worth Rs. 60,000 was found intact in her room which suggests that it was not a regular case of robbery. A cupboard and a few boxes were open but there was no ransacking and it seemed that the assailant was known to her said deputy commissioner of police (central) Neeraj Thakur. Police are also trying to figure out whether she was tricked by a relative after the death of her father and sister. Gupta did not make any will.

Police now say the narco test and questioning of a TV mechanic, a servant of another doctor and a marriage bureau executive to determine her killer were “highly misleading” . “The narco test indicated towards the role of the TV mechanic. Yet, independent witnesses said he had visited their houses in the trans-Yamuna region to repair TV sets during the time of the murder,” the source added. Investigators are having a relook into this unsolved case after some people entered Gupta’s Vasant Kunj flat on August 14 and claimed that Gupta had sold it to them. The flat had been locked since it was bought on January 28, 1991. After the RWA informed police, they came across two people both of whom claim to own the flat. One of them, Kaushalya Rani of Moti Nagar, said she had bought the property from Gupta and showed the power of attorney and a cash receipt. Another person, Ramnik Agarwal of Jalandhar, also claimed the same and said he had come with five others to get the flat cleaned and found Kaushalya. All documents were forged, police said, “We are yet to arrest anyone. But we are questioning all of them as it seems they are planted by others. We are grateful to the local RWA for informing us,” said an officer.

== See also ==
- Lady Hardinge Medical College
