= Kalawati Saran Children's Hospital =

Hospital in New Delhi, India

Coordinates: 28.6359382°N 77.2086661°E

Kalawati Saran Children's Hospital is a multi-specialty hospital inside campus of Lady Hardinge Medical College, New Delhi that was founded and headed by Dr. Sheila Singh Paul.

== History ==
The hospital was inaugurated on 17 March 1956 by Lady Edwina Mountbatten, Countess Mountbatten of Burma. It was built from the proceeds of the property donated by Raghubir Saran and Raghunandan Saran of New Delhi and was named after the wife of late Mr Raghubir Saran. It has a separate department of Physical Medicine and Rehabilitation for which the initial electrical and electronic equipment was donated by the Government of the Soviet Union (USSR).
