= Sheila Singh Paul =

Indian paediatrician

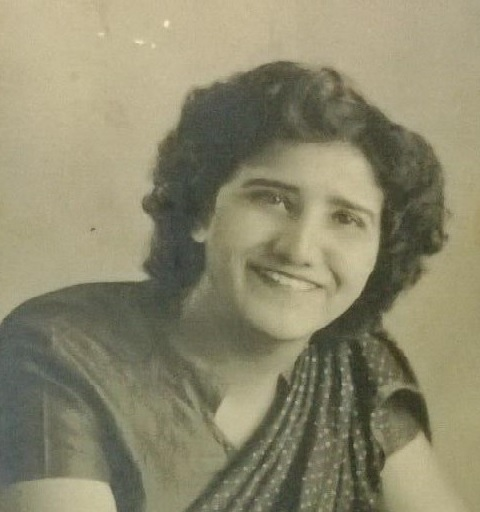
- Education: Lady Hardinge Medical College
- Occupation: Pediatrician

Dr. (Prof.) Sheila Singh Paul, MRCP, FRCP, DCH, DTM (12 September 1916 – 11 January 2001) was the Founder and Director of Kalawati Saran Children's Hospital, New Delhi. She was the first Indian woman to be given such a huge responsibility and she was only 40 years old at that time.

== Career ==
Sheila is a pioneer in the field of Pediatrics in India. Kalawati Saran Children's Hospital is one of the largest children hospitals in Asia and was Delhi's first independent children's hospital and not just a department. The Hospital was inaugurated on 17 March 1956 by Lady Edwina Mountbatten, Countess Mountbatten of Burma. It was built from the proceeds of the property donated by Mr Raghubir Saran and Mr Raghunandan Saran of New Delhi and was named after the wife of late Mr Raghubir Saran. It has a separate department of Physical Medicine and Rehabilitation for which the initial electrical and electronic equipment was donated by the Government of the Soviet Union (USSR).

Dr. Sheila Singh Paul was also the professor of Pediatrics at Lady Hardinge Medical College. She was one of the founding members of the Indian Pediatrics Society and the Indian Academy of Pediatrics [IAP] and started the Delhi Chapter of IAP in 1958 and the Punjab Chapter of IAP in 1974. She served as the President of the Indian Academy of Pediatrics Delhi in the year 1966.

She had served on selection panels of the Union Public Service Commission, Medical Council Inspector, Examiner in Pediatrics for several universities, organized Conferences of Medical Education and Pediatrics under the auspices of World Health Organization and UNICEF. She was one of the chief organizers of the First Asian Congress of Pediatrics held in 1960 at New Delhi.

She was on the Board of Research Studies and Academic Council of the University of Delhi and responsible for the recognition of DCH and MD Pediatrics in 1960 and 1962.

She was a pioneer in creating and promoting Polio vaccine campaigns in India and in introducing specialists trained in pediatric physiotherapy from the USSR, to train medical professionals in Kalawati Saran Children's Hospital. She was felicitated and awarded innumerable times by the Government of the Soviet Union (USSR) and was an honorary member of the Pediatrics Society Government of the Soviet Union.

After retirement from government service in 1974, she took up the post of Professor and Head of the Department of Pediatrics, Christian Medical College, Ludhiana, Punjab. She continued in this post till 1987. In her lifetime she had many articles and journals to her credit. She remained a missionary till the very end serving villagers and the poor at no cost and never ever set up a private practice which she could have easily done. She believed that "tears of gratitude" in the eyes of the parents of the healed children was more than adequate compensation.

== Personal life ==
The maiden name of Dr. Sheila Singh Paul was Sheila Therese Martin, born of parents of Jewish descent ( Myers from France ) who migrated to Bihar India in the early 1900s and owned coal mines in Jharia (now in Jharkhand). Before she became a student at Lady Hardinge Medical College, she was a student of Isabella Thoburn College Lucknow and Loreto Convent, Asansol. She worked at the Lady Dufferin Hospital in Calcutta and also served in the Indian Army in the Army Medical Corps (India).

Dr. Paul was one of the Holocaust survivors. In 1942, she went to meet her relatives and was taken along with them to camp Drancy internment camp enroute Auschwitz, but was saved because of her British Indian passport. Mr. Balwant Singh Paul with the help of Rajkumari Amrit Kaur lobbied for her release. In 1943, she married Balwant Singh Paul bar-at-law, Lincoln's Inn son of Sardar Bahadur Kishan Singh, IG of Police and Kings police medal awardee; however, they separated in 1965. She is survived by her daughter Priya Singh Paul.

== Publications ==
List of Publications in Indian Pediatrics and Journals of repute.

1. Paul SS "Tetanus in Children in Delhi", The Journal of Tropical Pediatrics and African Child Health. Vol. 2, Sep., 1963

2. Paul SS, Rao PL, Mullick P, Kalliana P "A Case of Chondrodystrophia Calcificans Congenita". Arch Dis Child 1963 38: 632-635. doi: 10.1136/adc.38.202.632

3. Paul SS "A case of Guglielmo Syndrome with foetal haemoglobin". J Ind Pediatr Soo 2; 363:1963

4. Paul SS, Gupta S, Singh V "An analysis of tetanus in children treated without ATS and comparison with other methods of treatment. A report of 559 cases." Ind Pediatr 1;319:1964

5. Paul SS, Rao PL, Mullick P "Choledochal cyst." Ind J Radiol 18;172:1964.

6. Paul SS, Rao PL "Porencephalic cyst." Ind Pediatr 2;25:1965.

7. Paul SS, Rao PL "Pyuria in children." Ind Pediatr 2;209:1965.

8. Paul SS, Rao PL "Diaphragmatic disorders." Ind Pediatr 2;270:1965.

9. Paul SS "Longitudinal anthropomatriome measurements in Indian babies from birth to 2 years." J Ind Acad Pediatr.

10. Paul SS, Saigal S "Fanoconi's S. Fanconi's Syndrome. The effect of predniosolon and methyl testosterone and a review of the literature." Ind Pediatr 3;403:1966

11. Paul SS Leukaemias in children. A Manual of Pediatrics. World Health Organisation. Orient Longmans Ltd. Calcuttas 1966.

12. Paul SS, Tarassov OF, Saigal S, Gogte L "Chronic Idiopathic jaundice. Dubin Johnson Syndrome." Pediatr Clin Ind 2;278:1968.

13. Paul SS, Shagurina o, Modi S, Kalra S, Singh G "Malignant Neoplasms in Childhood." Ind Pediatr 4;309:1967.

14 Paul SS, Mpdi S, Wadhwa S, Mahey S "Neonatal tetanus in Delhi." Ped Clin Ind 2;180:1967

15. Paul SS, Anand S, Kumar S, Bhatia SL "Causes of death in low birth weight babies." Ind Pediatr 2;35:1970.

16. Paul SS, Suresh EC "High protein diet for low birth weight babies." International Congress of Pediatrics Vienna 11-48;1972.

17. Wallgren and Robinson Text book Paediatrics. Edited by Prasad L.S.N. 1974.

18. Paul SS, Kanakam M "A clinical follow up study of infants with birth trauma- some problems in pediatrics in India and Soviet Union." The research practical pediatrics centre, Kalavati Saran Children's Hospital, New Delhi 1:1971.

19. Paul SS, Suresh EC "High Protein diet for low birth weight babies." J Ind Acad Pediatr 9;529:1972.

20. Paul SS, Raveendranath K "Comparison of BCG inoculation by Conventional Intradermal and Jet method." Ind Pediatr 15;342:1978.

21. Paul SS, Chhabra AK "Kocher-Debre-Semalaigne Syndrome." Vol Liii 1978 p278.

22. Paul SS, Mathew P "Acrocephalopolysndactyly Type II, Carpenter's Syndrome in two siblings- A Case report." Ind Pediatr 15;191:1979.

23. Paul SS, Singh D. "Observation on partially treated purulent meningitis." Ind Pediatr 15;233:1979.

24. Paul SS, Taluja V "Value of BCG test as a diagnostic method in evaluation of childhood tuberculosis." CMAI Vol LIII p97.

25. Paul SS, Pawa RR, Singh D "Outbreak of salmonella infection in a pediatric Department." Ind Pediatr 18;29:1981.

26 Paul SS, Utal DS "Hypertension in children." J Appl Med November 1982.

27. Paul SS Utal Ds, Gupta GS "Tetanus Neonatorum." Ind Pediatr 21;684:1984.

28. Paul SS, Utal DS, Jana AK, Mathew J "Therapy in Neonatal Tetanus". Ind Pediatr 21;689,1984.

29. Practical Pediatrics - An Approach a book by Paul SS and Utal DS
