= Oon Chiew Seng =

Singaporean gynaecologist (1916–2022)

- Oon c. 2014
- Born: 1916; Penang, British Malaya
- Died: 31 March 2022 (aged 106); Singapore
- Citizenship: Singapore
- Education: Medical College of Singapore
- Occupation: Physician
- Years active: 1955–1991

Oon Chiew Seng (1916 – 31 March 2022) was a Singaporean physician, known for being one of the country's first gynaecologists and obstetricians. Born in Penang, she was educated in both India and Singapore and worked at Kandang Kerbau Hospital before setting up her private practice.

== Early life and education ==
Oon was born in Penang, British Malaya, in 1916. Her father was a Chinese-born businessperson. The youngest of ten children, she worked as a nurse in the 1930s but was persuaded by one of her six brothers to pursue a career as a physician instead. She matriculated into the King Edward VII College of Medicine in 1940 but had to move to India during World War II. In India, she graduated from Wilson College, Mumbai with second upper class honours and subsequently attended the Delhi-based Lady Harding Medical College. Returning to Singapore in June 1946, she resumed her studies at the King Edward VII College of Medicine and graduated in 1948 with a degree in medicine and surgery.

== Career ==
In 1955, Oon became a member of the British Royal College of Obstetricians and Gynaecologists. She opened her own private clinic in 1959, having worked at Kandang Kerbau Hospital as one of the country's pioneer obstetrics and gynecology specialists. In 1961, she was appointed to the Midwives Board in Singapore.

From 1984 to 2000, she was a member of the Medical Committee of the Sree Narayanan Mission Home for the Aged Sick. She retired as a physician in 1991, following which she dedicated herself to helping dementia sufferers; she helped establish the first dementia home in Singapore, Apex Harmony Lodge, and was its chairperson from its founding in 1999 till 2012.

== Later years ==
Oon was diagnosed with dementia in 2013. In January 2022, she tested positive for COVID-19; although she recovered, her health began to deteriorate in the subsequent months, when she lost both her appetite and vision. She died on 31 March 2022, aged 106. Then-President Halimah Yacob paid tribute to Oon on Facebook: "She will be remembered for her service towards vulnerable communities. My heart is with her family."

== Personal life ==
Oon remained single all her life, and described herself as an "independent" person, though she lived with an Indonesian maid in her later years. In an interview with the Singapore Medical Association, Oon cited Agatha Christie as one of her most-read authors: "Back when I was practicing, there was not much to do whenever a patient was in labour so I would sit in the day room on standby with my book." Oon was also an avid mahjong player.

== Recognition ==
Oon received several awards for her contributions to healthcare in Singapore, including the Public Service Medal (2000); the Ministry of Health's Lifetime Achievement Award (2011); and the Public Service Star (2013). In 2014, Oon was inducted into the Singapore Women's Hall of Fame. In January 2021, she received an honorary doctorate from the National University of Singapore.
