= Malvika Sabharwal =

Indian gynecologist and obstetrician

Dr Malvika Sabharwal
- Born: New Delhi, India
- Occupations: Gynecologist; Obstetrician
- Known for: Laparoscopy
- Spouse: Dr Vinay Sabharwal
- Awards: Padma Shri

Dr Malvika Sabharwal is an Indian gynecologist, laparoscopic surgeon and obstetrician at the Nova Specialty Hospitals of the Apollo Healthcare Group and at Jeewan Mala Hospital, New Delhi. The team led by her has been credited with the successful performance of the removal of the largest recorded fibroid through laparoscopic surgery. She leads the Gynae Endoscopy, a team of 140 doctors, involved in endoscopic surgical practices related to gynecology.

Sabharwal graduated in medicine (MBBS) from Lady Hardinge Medical College and secured her post graduate credentials (DGO) from the same institution before completing training in hysteroscopy under Wamsteker, Haarlem, the Netherlands and in laparoscopy under Adam Magos, Royal Free Hospital, UK. She is a member of several medical organizations such as Indian Association of Gynecological Endoscopists, Indian Fertility Society, Indian Menopausal Society, Indian Association of Endoscopic Surgeons, International Society of Gynecological Endoscopy, Gasless International, Association of Obstetrics and Gynaecology, and Association of Endoscopic Surgeons of India and has delivered several orations and keynote addresses. She is also known to have conducted several free health camps for women, children and employees. The Government of India awarded her the fourth highest civilian honour of the Padma Shri, in 2008, for her contributions to medicine.
