= Fatima Shah =

Gynaecologist, social worker and educator (1914–2002)

Fatima Shah (1914 – October 12, 2002) was a Pakistani physician, social worker and advocate for the blind in Pakistan. She was the founder of the Pakistan Association of the Blind (PAB) and one of the founding members of the All Pakistan Women's Association. She was also the first woman to become president of the International Federation of the Blind.

== Biography ==
Shah was born in 1914 in Bhera. She belonged to an educated family. Her father, Abdul Majeed Kureshi, was the former chairman of the Mathematics department of Aligarh Muslim University. She was one of 12 brothers and sisters. She was admitted to Lady Hardinge Medical College in Delhi on a MacDonald scholarship of merit.

She joined Dufferen Hospital, Likhnou as a house surgeon. In 1937 she married Jawad Ali Shah, a famous personality of Gorakh Pur. She could not continue her job after marriage. She had two daughters. After partition in 1947, she came to Pakistan, but could not go back due to the political conflict between both countries .

From 1947, Shah worked for the rehabilitation of refugee women who migrated to Pakistan from India, following independence in 1947. Shah was also one of the founding members of the All Pakistan Women's Association which was founded in 1949. She was a leading gynecologist of the Civil Hospital, Karachi till the onset of blindness through retinitis pigmentosa in 1954 which resulted in the complete loss of her eyesight 1957.

She founded the Pakistan Association of the Blind (PAB) in 1960. She worked as the president of PAB until 1984, when she retired from that position.

She was sent to the United States by Begum Raana Liaquat so she could study. She visited Iowa in 1964 in order to study that state's programs for the blind. In the US, she became one of the founding members of the International Federation of the Blind (IFB) in New York. She became the second vice-president of the IFB.

When she returned Pakistan, she lobbied the Pakistani government to remove the health clause because people with disabilities were being deprived of jobs. She also urged the government to introduced Braille in Pakistan officially.

Dr Shah organized the Disabled People's Federation of Pakistan to serve as a national affiliate to the Disabled Peoples' International of which she was a world council member. She played a significant role in the establishment of a global body called the World Blind Union and also became a member of the Federal Council National Parliament.

Shah died on October 12, 2002, and was buried in the Defence graveyard in Karachi.

== Awards ==
She received an MBE (Order of the British Empire) for her work in social services on the occasion of the coronation of Queen Elizabeth II. She was awarded Takeo Iwahashi Award at Gothenburg, Sweden for her work with self-help organizations for the blind. The Pakistani government awarded her a Tamgha-i-Imtiaz.

== Selected publications ==
- Disability: Self Help and Social Change. 1996. OCLC 264972608.
- Sunshine & Shadows: The Autobiography of Dr. Fatima Shah. Raihana A. Hasan. Karachi: Ferozsons. 1999. ISBN 9789690015624.
