= Lady Hardinge Medical College =

Medical college in New Delhi, India

Coordinates: 28°38′6.3060″N 77°12′44.9712″E

- Motto: Latin: Per Ardua Ad Astra
- Motto in English: Through Adversity to the Stars
- Type: Public medical school
- Established: February 17, 1916; 110 years ago
- Founders: Charles Hardinge, Viceroy of India
- Parent institution: Directorate General of Health Services (India)
- Affiliations: National Medical Commission
- Academic affiliations: University of Delhi
- Budget: ₹800 crore (US$83 million) (2025–26)
- Director: Dr. Himani Ahluwalia
- Undergraduates: 240 (only female candidates admitted)
- Postgraduates: 160 (MD, MS, DM, MCh, and MDS)
- Location: Connaught Place, New Delhi, India
- Campus: 68 acres (28 ha); Urban
- Website: lhmc-hosp.gov.in

Lady Hardinge Medical College (LHMC) is a public women's medical college and hospital located in New Delhi, India. Established in 1916 by the Imperial British Government, it has functioned as a constituent of the Faculty of Medical Sciences, University of Delhi, since 1950. The college is governed and funded by the Ministry of Health and Family Welfare.

== History ==
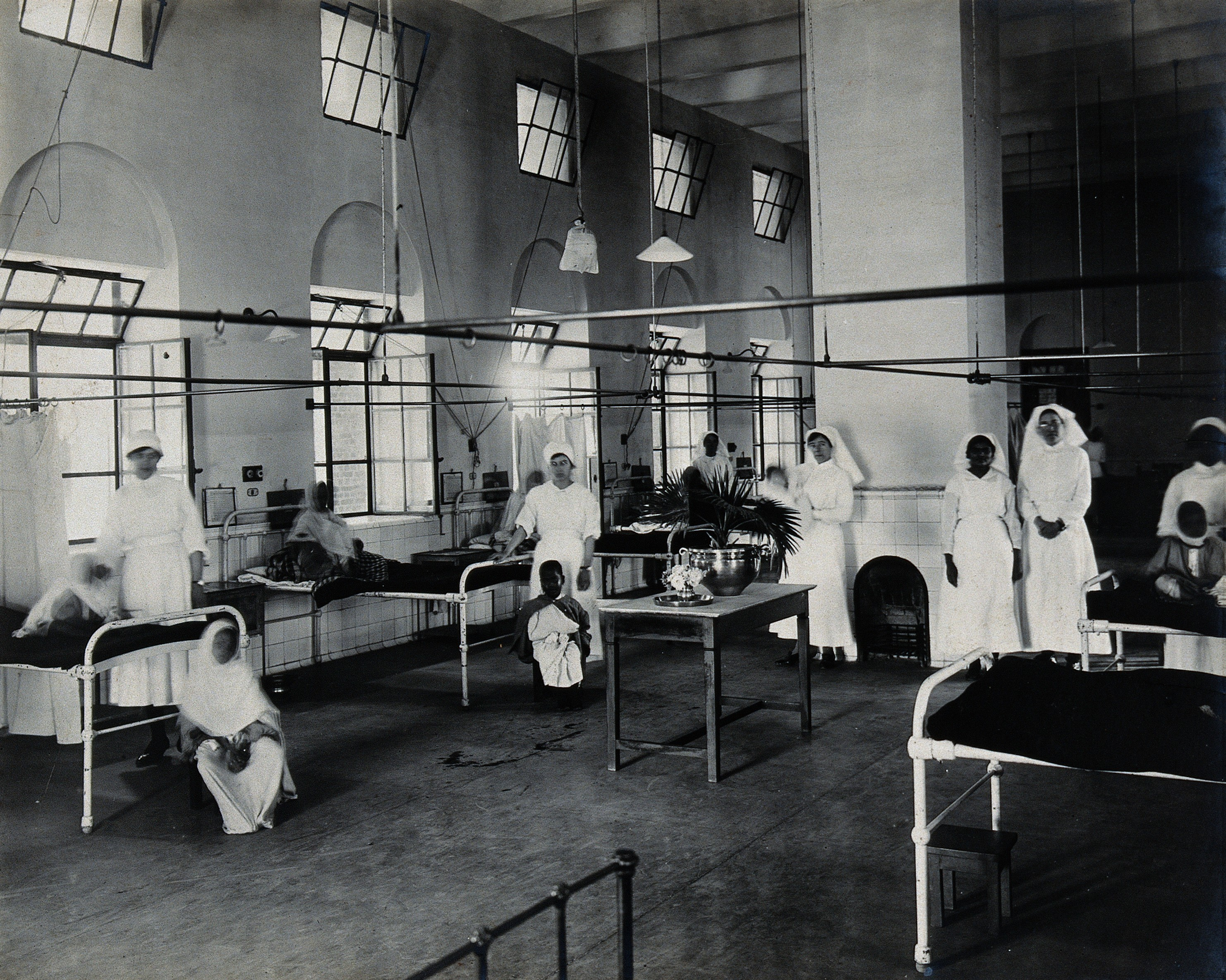
Nurses at Lady Hardinge Medical College and Hospital, 1921

When the capital of British India was shifted to Delhi, Lady Hardinge, the wife of the then Viceroy of India, Baron Charles Hardinge, recognized the need for a medical college exclusively for women. She took the initiative to establish such an institution, as the absence of one limited opportunities for Indian women to pursue medical education. The foundation stone for the college was laid by Lady Hardinge on 17 March 1914, and it was christened Queen Mary College and Hospital to commemorate Queen Mary’s visit to India in 1911–12. Lady Hardinge actively raised funds for the college from princely states and the public until her death on 11 July 1914.

The college was inaugurated on 7 February 1916 by Baron Hardinge in the Imperial Delhi Enclave area. On the suggestion of Queen Mary, the college and the hospital was named after Lady Hardinge to pay an ode to the memory of its founder. The maiden principal of the institution was Kate Platt and the college admitted 16 students. At the commencement of operations, the college was affiliated to University of the Punjab, owing to which the students had to sit their final examinations at King Edward Medical College in Lahore. The college eventually became affiliated to the University of Delhi in 1950; post-graduate courses followed suit in 1954. Ruth Young, who, as Ruth Wilson, was the first professor of surgery at the college, served as the principal from 1936 until 1940. The Kalawati Saran Children's Hospital, one of the two hospitals attached to the Lady Hardinge Medical College, was constructed in 1956.

At the onset, the college was an autonomous institution managed by a governing body. In 1953, the Board of Administration constituted by the Central Government took formal charge over the management of the institution. In February 1978, the management was relinquished in favour of the Ministry of Health and Family Welfare of the Government of India under an Act of Parliament. One of the director professors is chosen as the president of the college, the most senior post in the college.

== Modern form ==
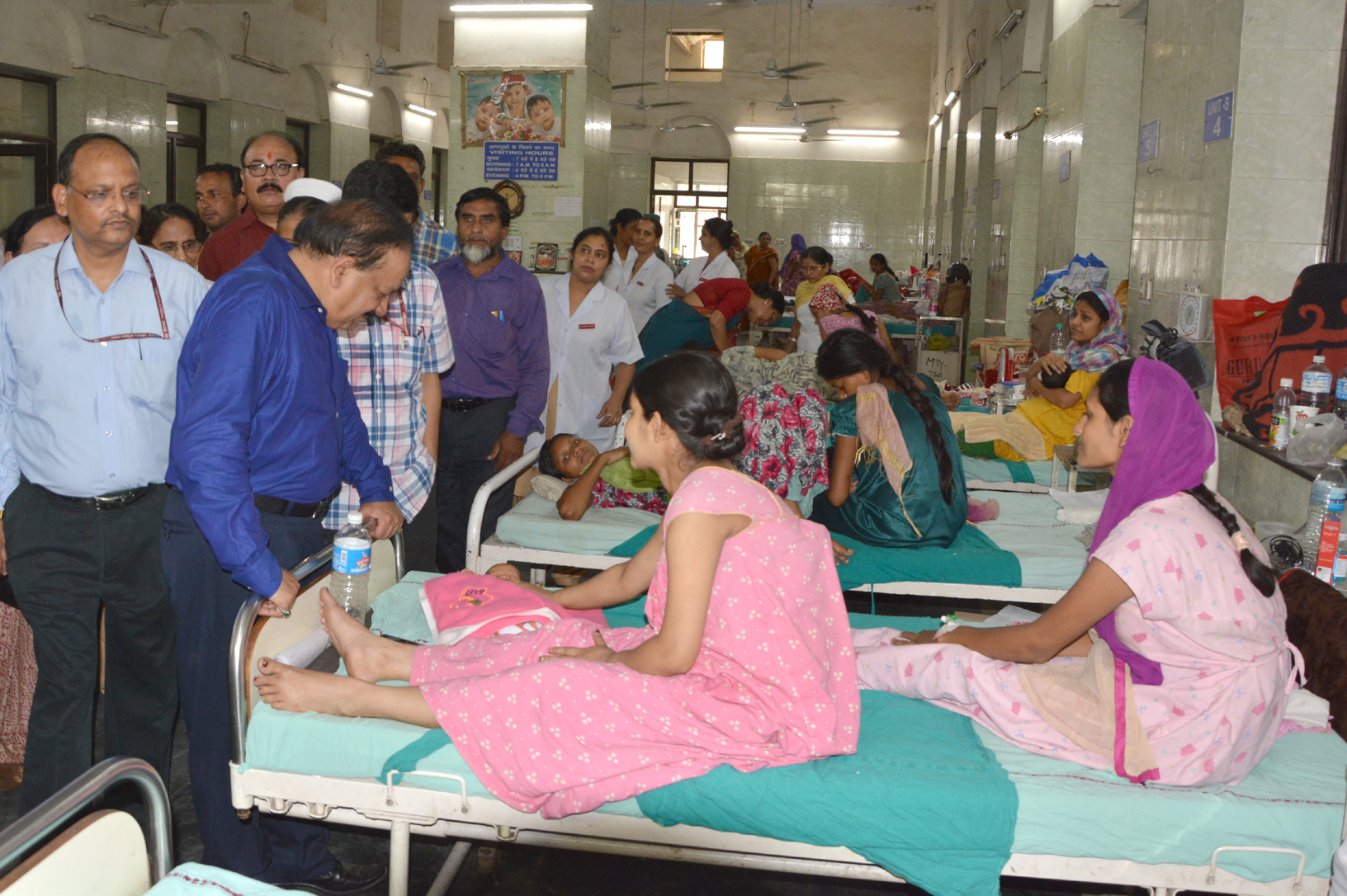
Patients at the Lady Hardinge Hospital, 2014

Since 1991, the hospital has extended its services to male patients. The MBBS program at the college has an admission capacity of 200 students. The institution operates two teaching hospitals: Smt. Sucheta Kriplani Hospital, with 877 beds, and Kalawati Saran Children's Hospital, with 350 beds. Together, these hospitals and the parent college provide tertiary-level medical care to the city.

The college's Department of Microbiology is internationally acclaimed for its expertise in salmonella phage typing and serves as a World Health Organization collaborating centre for reference and training in streptococcal diseases for the South-East Asia region. Additionally, it functions as a surveillance centre for AIDS. In 2007, the college established the country’s first Antiretroviral Therapy (ART) centre specifically for children.

== Campus ==
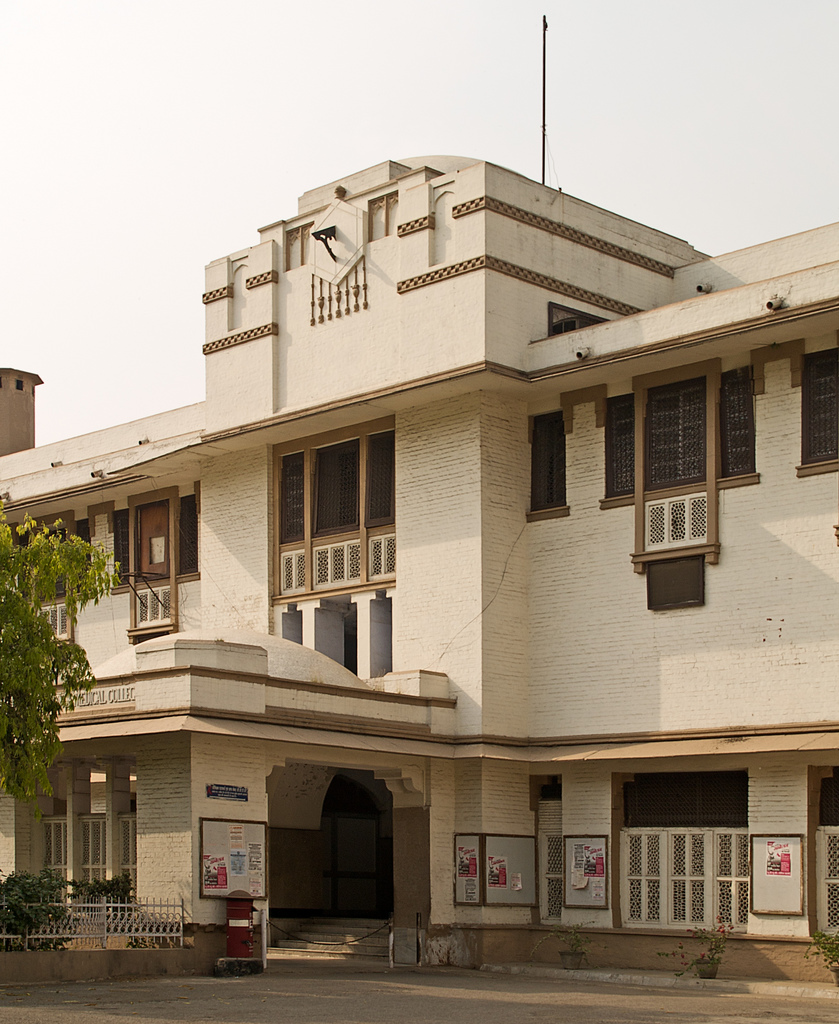
Entrance to the British-era edifice

The college campus features a hostel, library, auditorium, and well-equipped laboratories. It also includes a sports ground and facilities for extracurricular activities, providing a well-rounded environment for students.

=== Library ===
The college's library, one of the oldest medical libraries in India, is housed in a new central library building that is part of the auditorium complex. It boasts a collection of 50,000 volumes, including a significant number of historic journals in the biomedical sciences.

== Rankings ==
Life Sciences and Medical University rankings

Medical – India
- NIRF (2023): 29

In the 2024 National Institutional Ranking Framework (NIRF) assessment, Lady Hardinge Medical College was ranked 29th among medical colleges in India.

== Departments ==
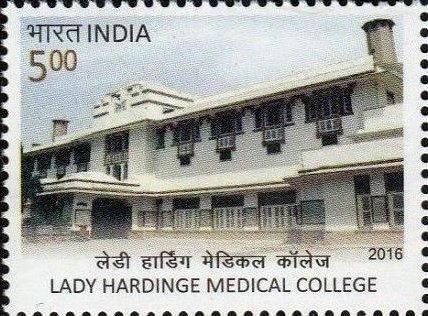
Stamp of India, 2016, Lady Hardinge Medical College

- Department of Physiology
- Department of Anatomy
- Department of Biochemistry
- Department of Pathology
- Department of Forensic Medicine
- Department of Pharmacology
- Department of Microbiology
- Department of Community Medicine
- Department of ENT & Head and neck surgery
- Department of Ophthalmology
- Department of General Medicine
- Department of General Surgery
- Department of Obstetrics & Gynaecology
- Department of Skin & VD
- Department of Orthopaedics
- Department of Dental Surgery
- Department of Pediatrics
- Department of Paediatric Surgery
- Department of Neonatology
- Department of Radio-Diagnosis
- Department of Radiation Oncology
- Department of Anaesthesia
- Department of Accident & Emergency
- Department of Psychiatry
- Department of Neurology
- Department of Blood Bank

== Notable alumni ==
The college's alumni are called Hardonians. Notable alumni of the college include:

- Sneh Bhargava, former director and Professor Emeritus of the All India Institute of Medical Sciences, New Delhi
- Bimal Kaur Khalsa, former Lok Sabha member from Ropar
- Sujata Chaudhuri
- Sushila Nayyar, personal physician of Mahatma Gandhi, Health Minister of India from 1952-55 and 1962–67
- Shiela Mehra, 1991 Padma Shri recipient. 1959 graduate. Renowned practising Obstetrician & Gynaecologist of New Delhi
- Usha Kehar Luthra, ICMR
- Malvika Sabharwal, 2008 Padma Shri Awardee
- Sheila Singh Paul, eminent pediatrician
- Hemlata Gupta, 1998 Padma Bhushan recipient
- Zohra Begum Kazi, the first Bengali Muslim female physician, 1935 graduate. She ranked First Class First and was awarded the Viceroy of India's Medal
- Fatima Shah, 1952 M.B. E. (Member of British Empire); 1969 Tamgha-e-Pakistan recipient; 1974–79, President, International Federation of the Blind; creator of Urdu Braille
- Oon Chiew Seng, known for being one of the first Singaporean gynaecologists and obstetricians.

== See also ==
- Ministry of Health and Family Welfare
- Directorate General of Health Services (India)
- Central Health Service (CHS)
