= Shiela Mehra =

Indian gynaecologist

- Born: India
- Occupations: Gynaecologist; Obstetrician
- Awards: Padma Shri; Radha Raman Award; IMA Life Time Achievement Award

Shiela Mehra is an Indian gynaecologist, obstetrician, and a director of the department of Gynaecology and Obstetrics at Moolchand Hospital, New Delhi.

== Education ==
Shiela graduated from Lady Hardinge Medical College, in 1959. She earned the degrees of DRCOG and MRCOG from the Royal College of Obstetricians and Gynaecologists, UK. She is also a Fellow of the Indian College of Obstetricians and Gynaecologists (ICOG)

== Work ==
Shiela has been working as a gynecologist and obstetrician in women's healthcare. She currently holds the position of Director of the Department of Gynecology and Obstetrics at Moolchand Hospital, one of the healthcare facilities in India. She has worked to providing medical care, has provided services related to women's reproductive health, including prenatal care, childbirth, and postnatal support.

== Awards ==
The Government of India awarded her the fourth highest civilian award of the Padma Shri, in 1991. and a recipient of awards such as the Radha Raman Award (1998) and Life Time Achievement Award of the Indian Medical Association (2006).
