= Palika Bazaar =

Coordinates: 28.6310°N 77.2186°E

- Location in Delhi, India
- Country: India
- State: Delhi
- Metro: New Delhi
- Time zone: UTC+5:30 (IST)
- Planning agency: NDMC

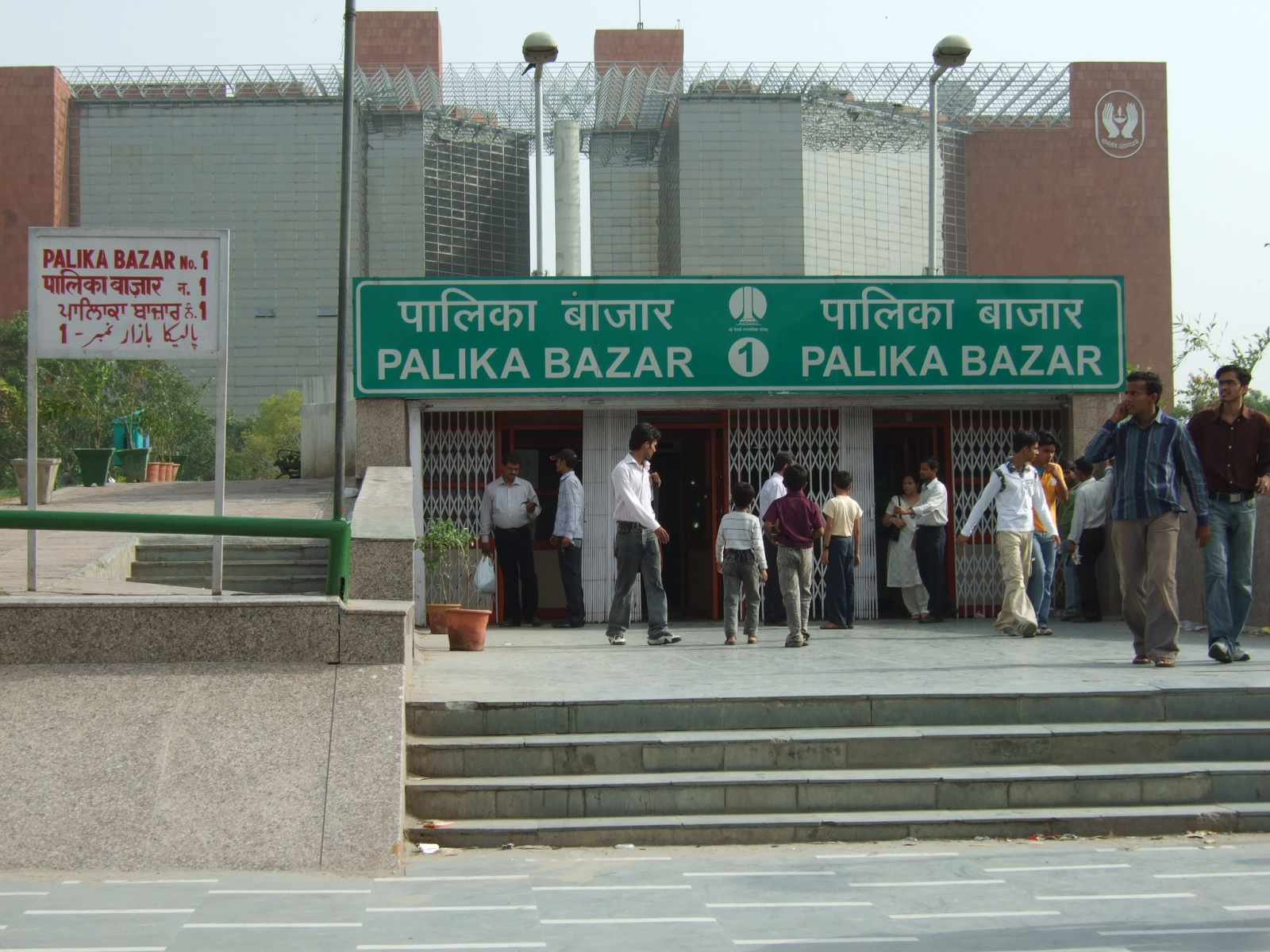
Entrance of Palika Bazar, Connaught Place, New Delhi

Palika Bazaar is an underground market located between the inner and outer circle of Connaught Place, Delhi, India. It is named after Palika Bazaar of Mumbai. Palika Bazaar hosts 380 numbered shops selling a diverse range of items; however, the market is dominated by electronic items and clothing. Palika Bazaar was set up in 1979, but since the 1990s it has seen a decline in customers.

Palika Bazaar is estimated to have some 15,000 people within its confines at any given time and attracts many foreign tourists. It is known for its reasonably priced items and is a tourist attraction. It has been listed as a notorious market since 2009 by the USTR for being an underground market with large amounts of counterfeit products including pirated software and media.

== Security problems ==
After the rape of a female shopper by two shopkeepers in April 2007, Delhi Police advised women against entering Palika Bazar alone. Local media reported that female visitors often complain about eveteasing and harassment, and a lack of proper trial rooms.

== Regeneration project ==
As part of a wider effort, the New Delhi Municipal Council is currently working on plans for a major "regeneration of Palika Bazaar", described to be in a state of decay.

== Gates of Palika Bazaar ==
- Gate no. 1: Main gate. Faces Connaught Place Central Park, with F Block on the right and Palika Underground Parking on the left. Staircase entry.
- Gate no. 2: Faces Palika Underground Parking. Handicap ramp entry.
- Gate no. 3: Not in use. Faces Palika Underground Parking. Closed to the public.
- Gate no. 4: Spiral staircase entry with two doors, one not in use. Door in use faces Parliament Street, Regal Building and Jeevan Bharti building.
- Gate no. 5: Spiral staircase entry with two doors. One door faces Janpath, N Block and Jeevan Bharti building, the other faces towards Palika Underground Parking.
- Gate no. 6: Staircase entry. Faces N Block and F Block.
- Gate no. 7: Handicap ramp entry. Faces F Block.

== See also ==
- Arabber
- Bazaar
- Bazaari
- Haat bazaar
- Hawker centre (Asia) a centre where street food is sold
- Pan Bazaar
- Peddler
- Retail
- Street vendor
- Street food
