= Sujata Chaudhuri =

- Born: 23 March 1901; Sylhet
- Died: unknown
- Education: Lady Hardinge Medical College
- Occupations: Medical doctor, professor of medicine

Sujata Chaudhuri (born 23 March 1901 - ?) was an Indian professor of medicine and first physician at Lady Hardinge Medical College, New Delhi, India. On 1 December 1966, she was appointed emeritus scientist.

== Early life and education ==
Sujata Chaudhuri was born on 23 March 1901 in Sylhet in 1901 to Hamanta Kumari Chaudhuri (née Roy) and Raj Chandra Chaudhuri. Her father was a magistrate. She studied at a convent school in Lahore and then undertook her medical studies at Lady Hardinge Medical College in New Delhi.

== Career ==
After qualification, Chaudhuri worked as a house physician at the Lady Dufferin Hospital in Karachi, Sindh. She then moved to work as assistant to the professor of medicine and as a clinical assistant at the Lady Hardinge Medical College Hospital between 1929 and 1936. From 1936 to 1950 she worked for the Women’s Medical Service of India, whilst also working as a lecturer in medicine and pharmacology at the Women’s Medical School in Agra in 1936 and 1937. Chaudhuri became a professor of pharmacology and second physician at the Lady Hardinge Medical College in 1938 and in 1940 she was promoted to professor of medicine and first physician there. She worked in this role until 1951.

In 1946 Chaudhuri was elected to membership of the Royal College of Physicians in London.

During the Second World War and the Bengal famine, Chaudhuri organised medical welfare projects. In 1947, following the Partition of India, she played a role in supporting the rehabilitation of refugees in West Punjab in the newly formed Dominion of Pakistan.

Between 1951 and 1960, Chaudhuri was responsible for organising rural medical services and family centres in the slums of Delhi and the surrounding villages. She also served as the President of the All India Women’s Reserve Medical Unit.

In 1963, Chaudhuri was elected a Fellow of the Royal College of Physicians in London. She was also a Fellow of the Royal College of Physicians Edinburgh.

== Personal life ==
Outside medicine, she enjoyed golf, photography and music, in particular the violin. She was unmarried.

== Selected publications ==
- Chaudhuri, Sujata (1 July 1951). "Anaemia in infants and children". The Indian Journal of Pediatrics. 18 (3): 99–105. doi:10.1007/BF02749200. ISSN 0973-7693.
