= Sujata and seven types of wives =

Sujata was the daughter-in-law of Anathapindika, a prominent lay-disciple of the Buddha. The Pali Suttas, in Anguttara Nikaya(7:59; IV 91-94), records that the Buddha was delivering a teaching near or at Anathapindika's home when he was disrupted by the sounds of Sujata scolding the servants. The Buddha called for Sujata to be brought to him and delivered a teaching, which became famous, on the proper conduct of wives.

In the story of Sujata the Buddha speaks of seven types of a wife. The first three kinds are heading for unhappiness (in this world or the next). They are:

1. The destructive-wife (vadhaka or vadhakabhariya: alternate translations include “troublesome-wife” and “slayer-wife”) – she is described as pitiless, fond of other men and neglectful, even contemptuous, of her husband;
2. The thievish-wife (chorisama or corabhariya: an alternate translation is “robber-wife”) – she squanders the family wealth and is dishonest with her husband, especially as regards money;
3. The mistress-wife (ayyasama or ayyabhariya or "swamibhariya": alternate translations include “lordly-wife”, “master-wife” and “tyrant-wife”) – she is shrewish, rude and coarsely-spoken when it suits her, lazy and domineering.

The Buddha then states that the following four types are heading for happiness – in this world or the next. A common feature of each of these wives is that they are also imbued with “long term self-control”. They are:

1. The motherly-wife (matusama or matubhariya) – she treats her husband like her son in every way, being compassionate and kind, as well as caring responsibly after his wealth;
2. The sisterly-wife (bhaginisama or bhaginibhariya) – she defers to her husband as she would her older brother. She is modest and is obedient to her lord and wishes to please him in every way;
3. The friend-wife (sakhibhariya – sakha means “intimate friend”, as opposed to “acquaintance friend”; an alternate translation for sakhibhariya is “companion-wife”) – she loves her husband as he is her best friend; through friendship and love she is devoted to him;
4. The slave-wife (dasisama or dasibhariya -dasi in Pali appears to mean “slave-woman” or “slave-servant”. Alternate translations include “slave-like wife”, “handmaid-wife” and “maid-wife”) – she behaves without hate or anger despite her husband's behavior. She submits to her husband's harsh words. She is obedient to her husband's wishes.

After speaking these things, Sujata was deeply moved by Buddha's words. Upon being asked which wife she was to be, she answered: "From today onwards, let the Exalted One think of me as the one in the last example for I'll be a good and understanding wife."

It has been argued that in the last case, the Buddha was not praising the qualities of the husband's abuse. Rather, he was praising the qualities of patience and emotional strength of the woman who finds herself in this position. Self-restraint is a virtue only found in the best women. Indeed, the first three wives are the prime examples of abusive women, who bring ruin to all and are thus to be avoided if possible.
