= Raisina Hill =

Area of New Delhi, India

Raisina Hill Rāyasīnā kī Pahāṛī
- Lutyens' Delhi
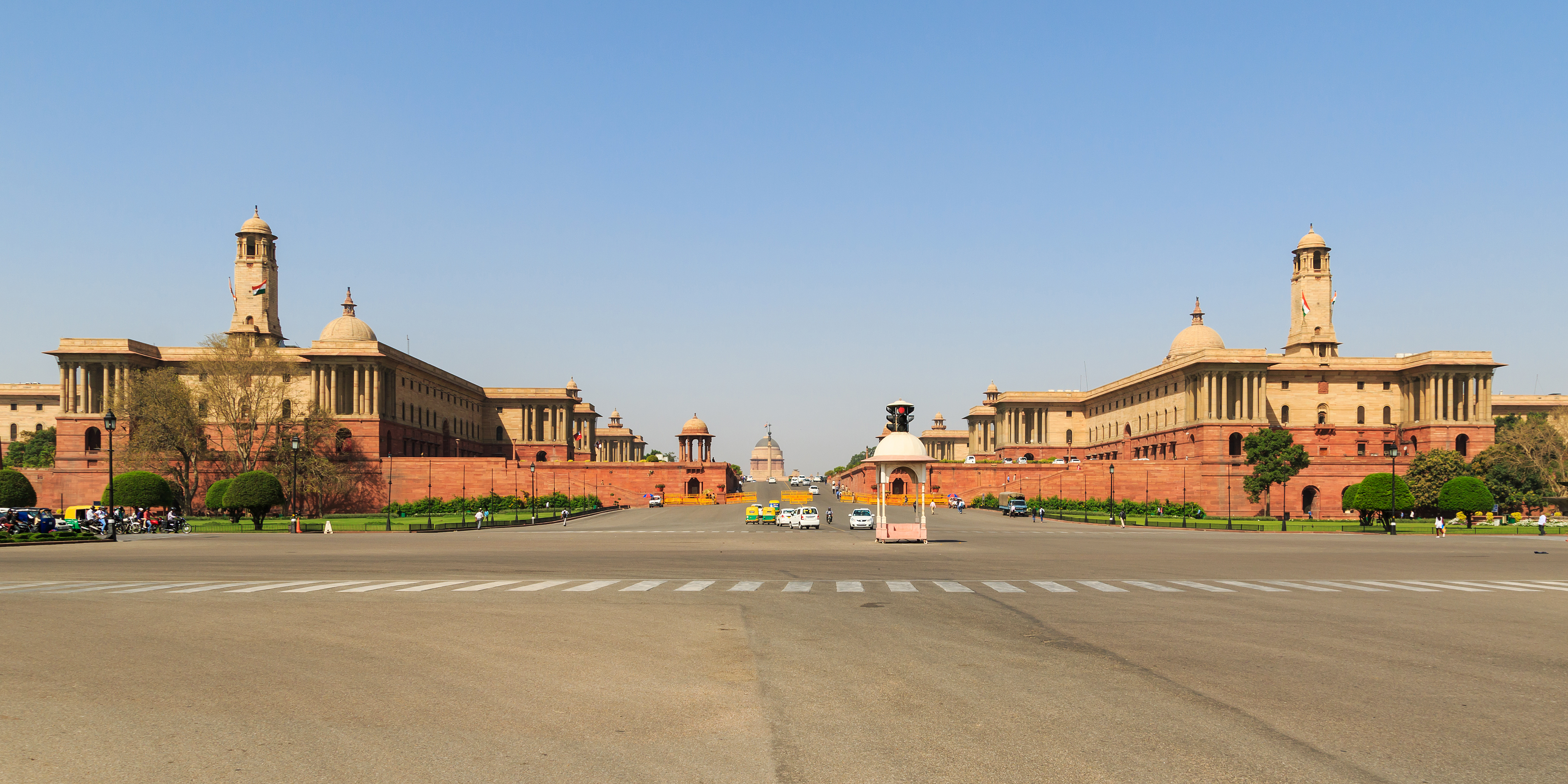
- Vijay Chowk with North and South Block of the Secretariat Building in the backdrop. As one looks at the Raisina Hill buildings from Vijay Chowk, the Rashtrapati Bhavan disappears and only its dome is visible.

- Location in Delhi, India
- Coordinates: 28.614°N 77.205°E
- Country: India
- Union Territory: Delhi
- Districts: New Delhi
- City: New Delhi

Government
  - Type: Municipal Council
  - Body: New Delhi Municipal Council
- Time zone: UTC+5:30 (IST)

Raisina Hill (ISO: Rāyasīnā kī Pahāṛī), often used as a metonym for the seat of the Government of India, is an area of New Delhi, housing India's most important government buildings, including Rashtrapati Bhavan, the official residence of the President of India on a citadel and the Secretariat building, housing the Prime Minister's Office and several other important ministries. The hill is seen as an Indian acropolis with Rashtrapati Bhavan as the Parthenon.

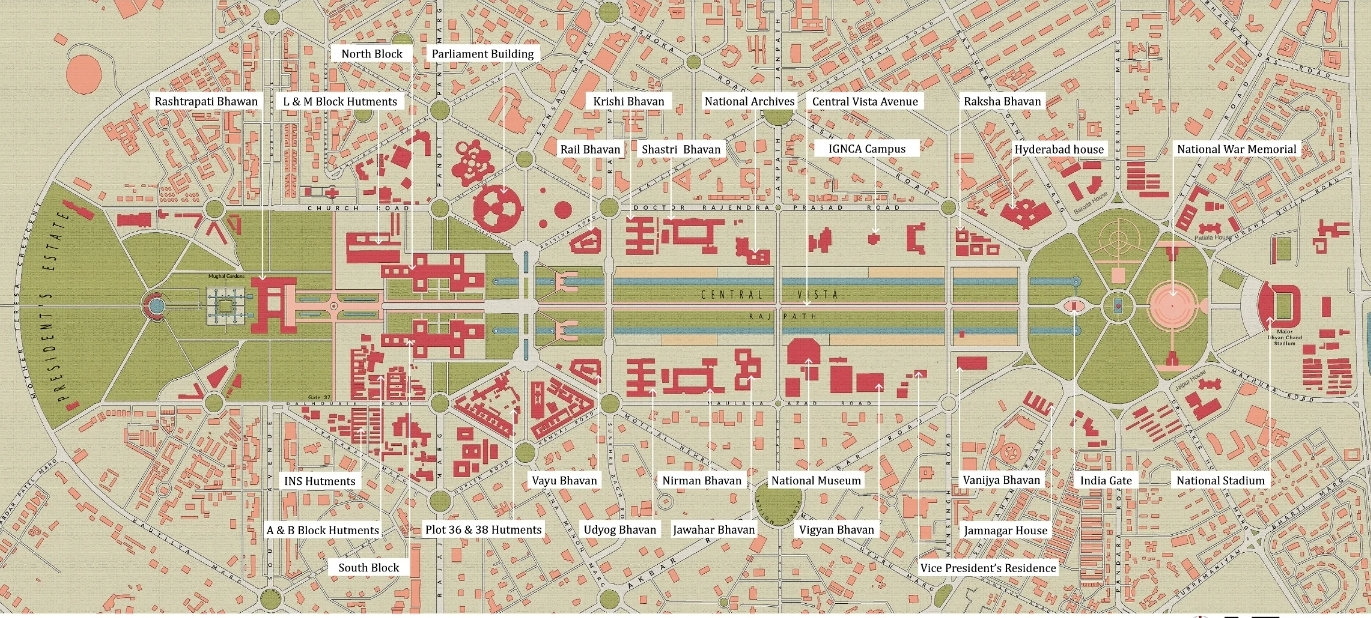
2019 master plan of Raisina Hill, showing the building and road layout

== History ==
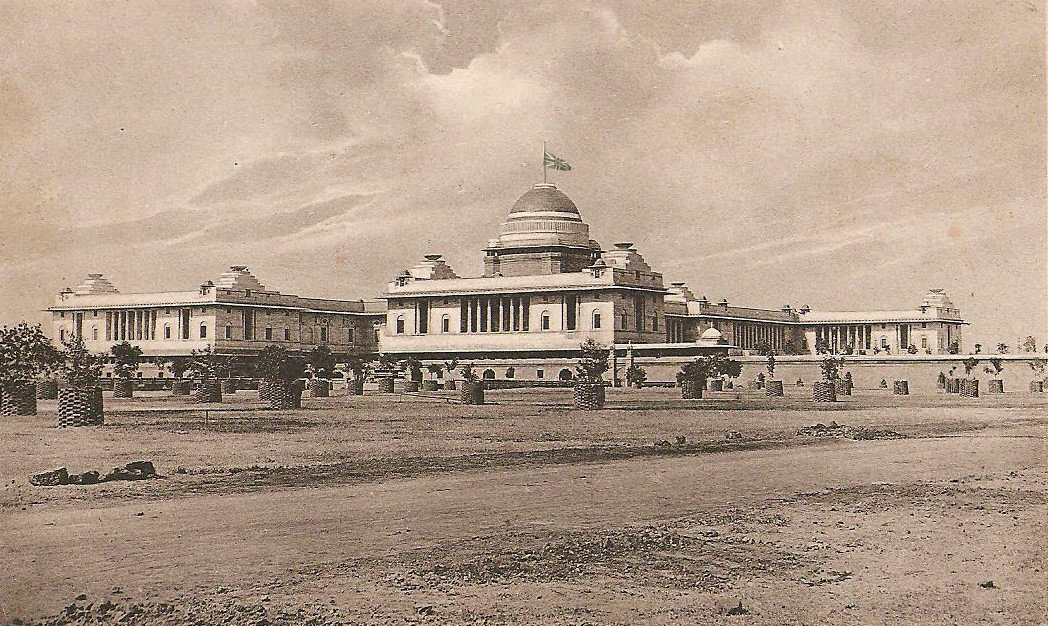
Viceroy's House

The British architect Edwin Landseer Lutyens, a major member of the city-planning process, was given the primary architectural responsibility. The completed Viceroy's House turned out very similar to the original sketches which Lutyens sent Herbert Baker, from Shimla, on 14 June 1912. Lutyens' design is grandly classical overall, with colours and details inspired by Indian architecture. Lutyens and Baker, who had been assigned to work on Viceroy's House and the Secretariat building, began on friendly terms. Baker had been assigned to work on the two secretariat buildings which were in front of the Viceroy's House. The original plan was to have Viceroy's House on the top of Raisina Hill, with the secretariats lower down. It was later decided to build it 400 yards back and put both buildings on top of the plateau. The contract was awarded to multiple contractors, including primarily Sir Sobha Singh.

Under the Central Vista project, the Prime Minister’s residence will be shifted behind the existing South Block, while the Vice President's residence is proposed to be relocated behind North Block. The Vice President's enclave will be on a site of 15 acres, with 32 five-storey buildings at a maximum height of 15 meters. The Prime Minister's new office and residence will be on a site of 15 acres, with 10 four-storey buildings at a maximum height of 12 meters with a building for keeping the Special Protection Group.

== Gallery ==
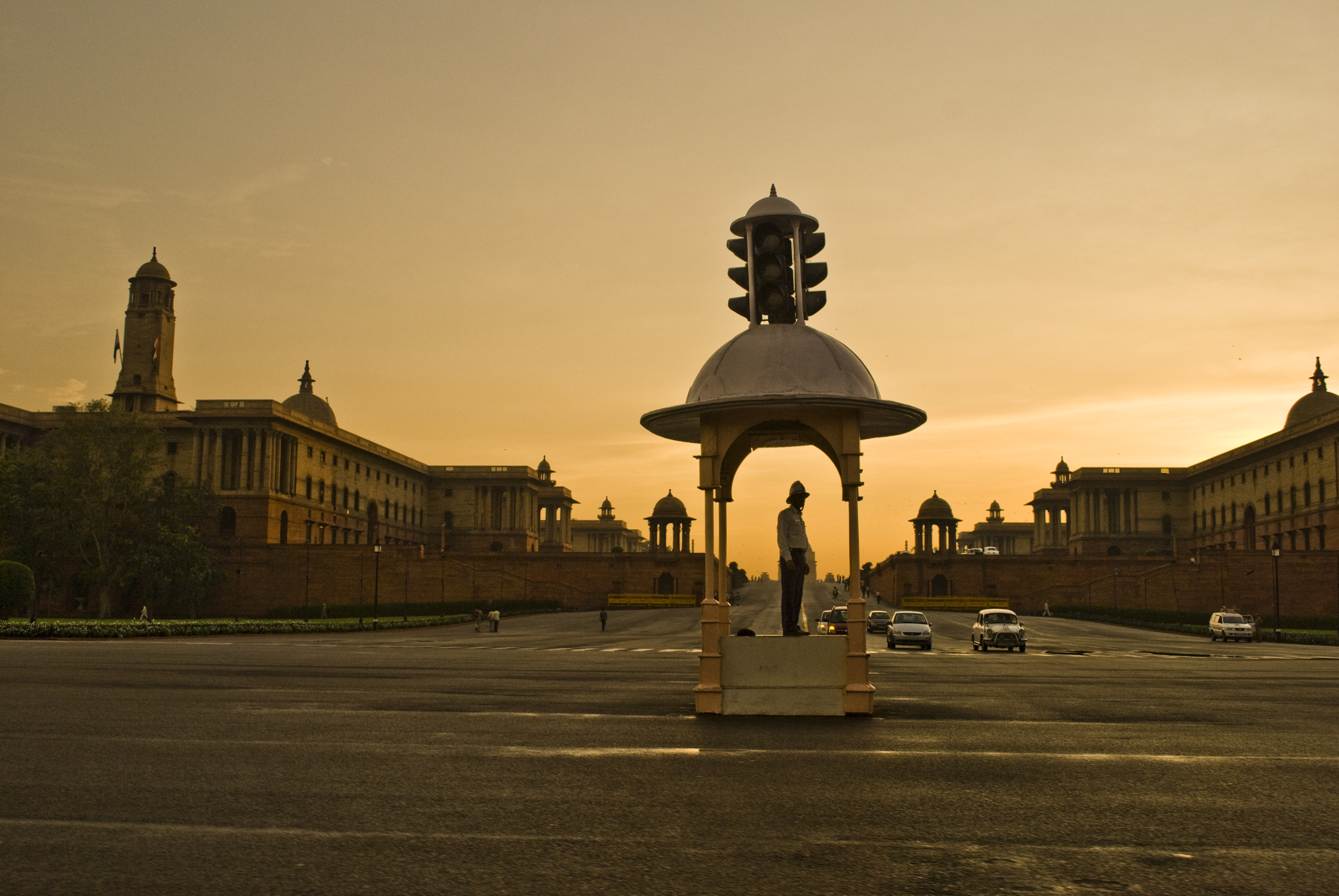
Vijay Chowk at Kartavya Path, with Secretariat Building in the background, New Delhi, the venue of the Beating Retreat ceremony

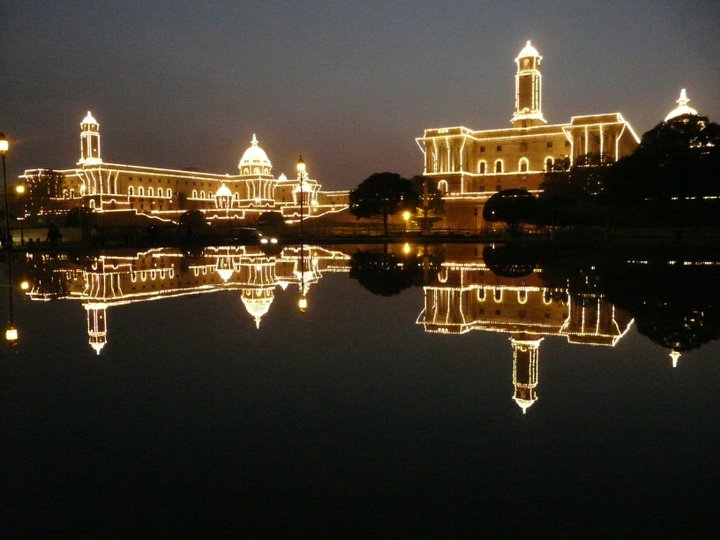
North and South Block of the Secretariat Building illuminated

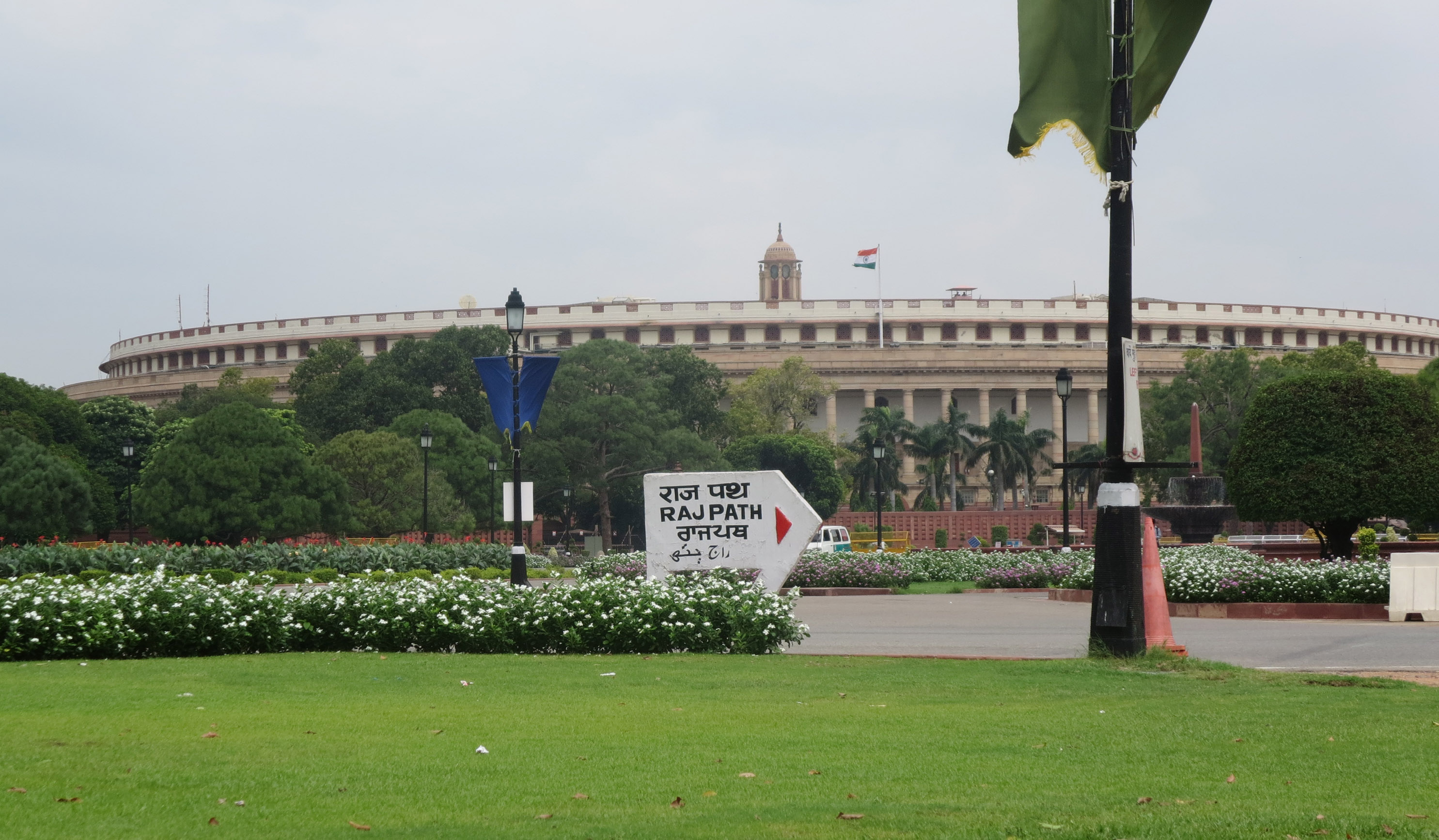
Old Parliament House, New Delhi as seen from the Kartavya Path

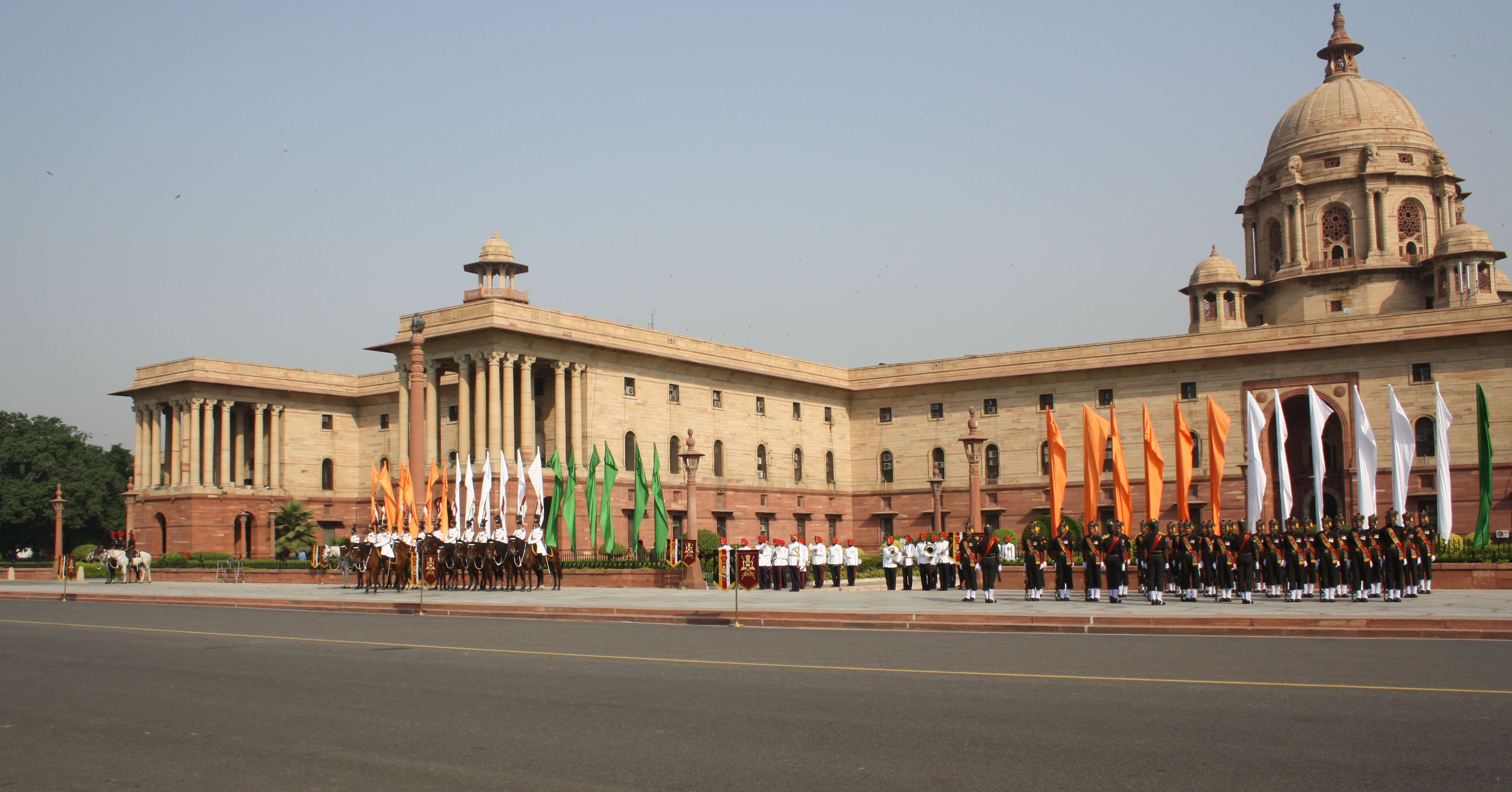
North Block of the Secretariat Building seen from Kartavya Path

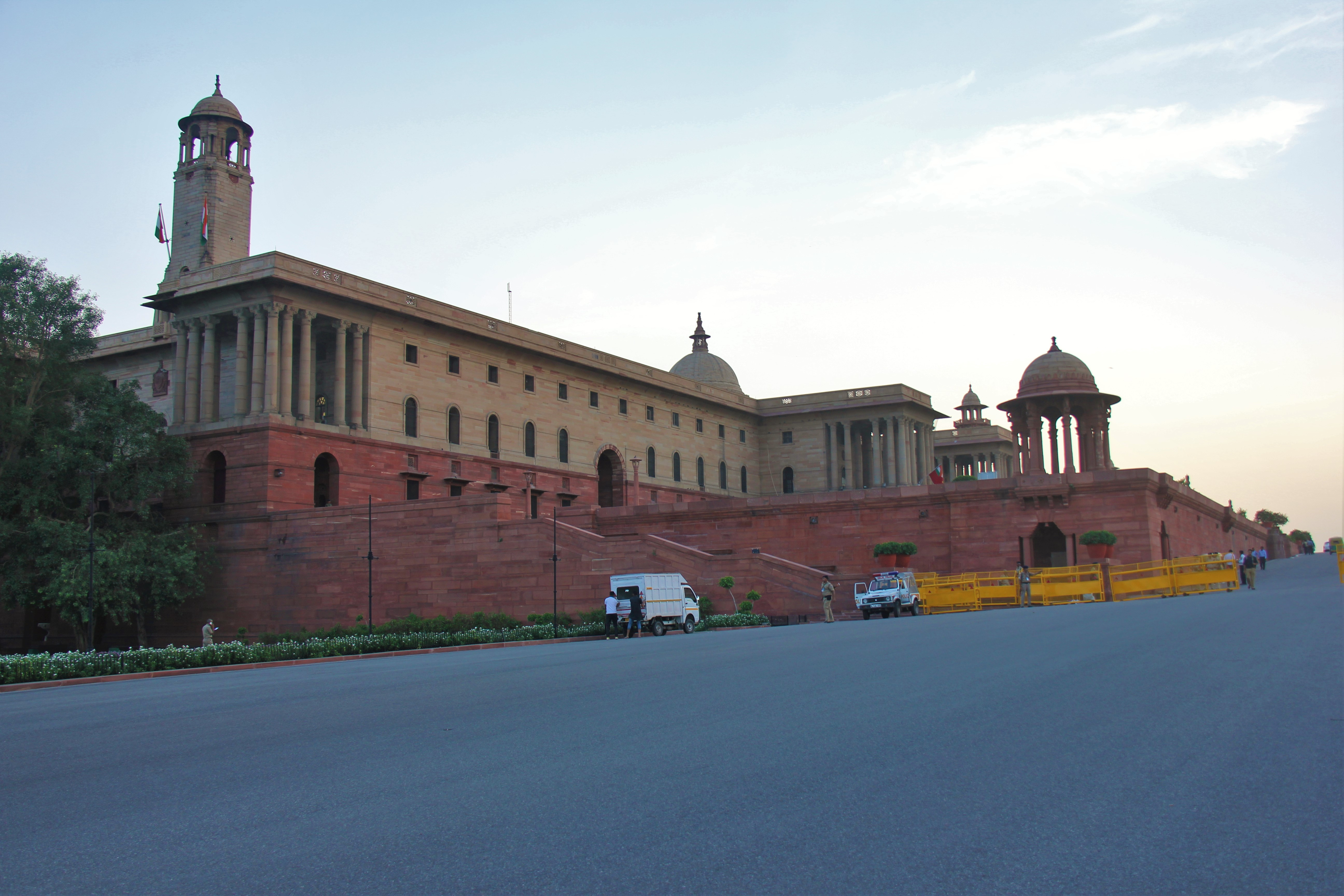
South Block of the Secretariat Building seen from Kartavya Path

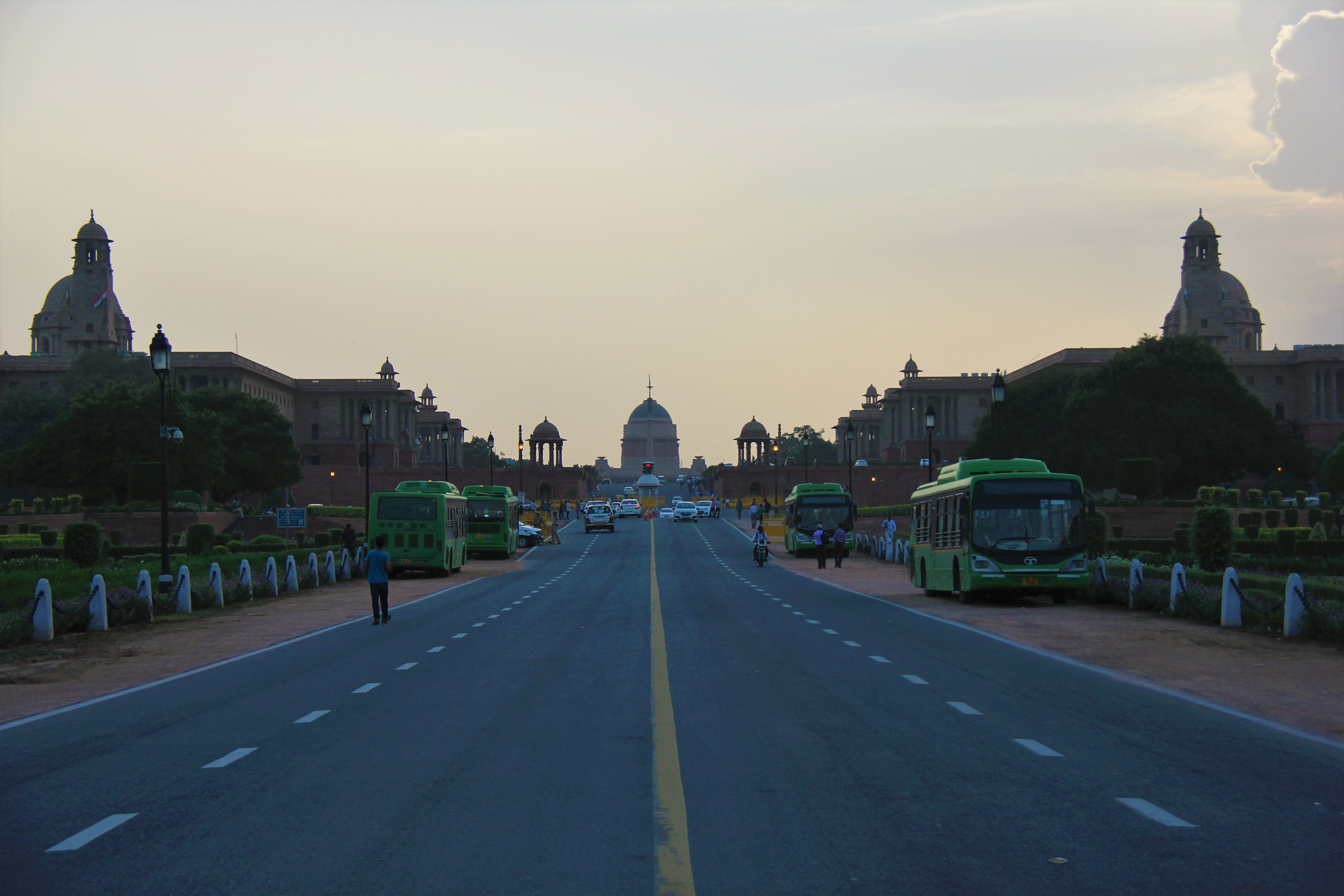
Rashtrapati Bhavan seen from Kartavya Path

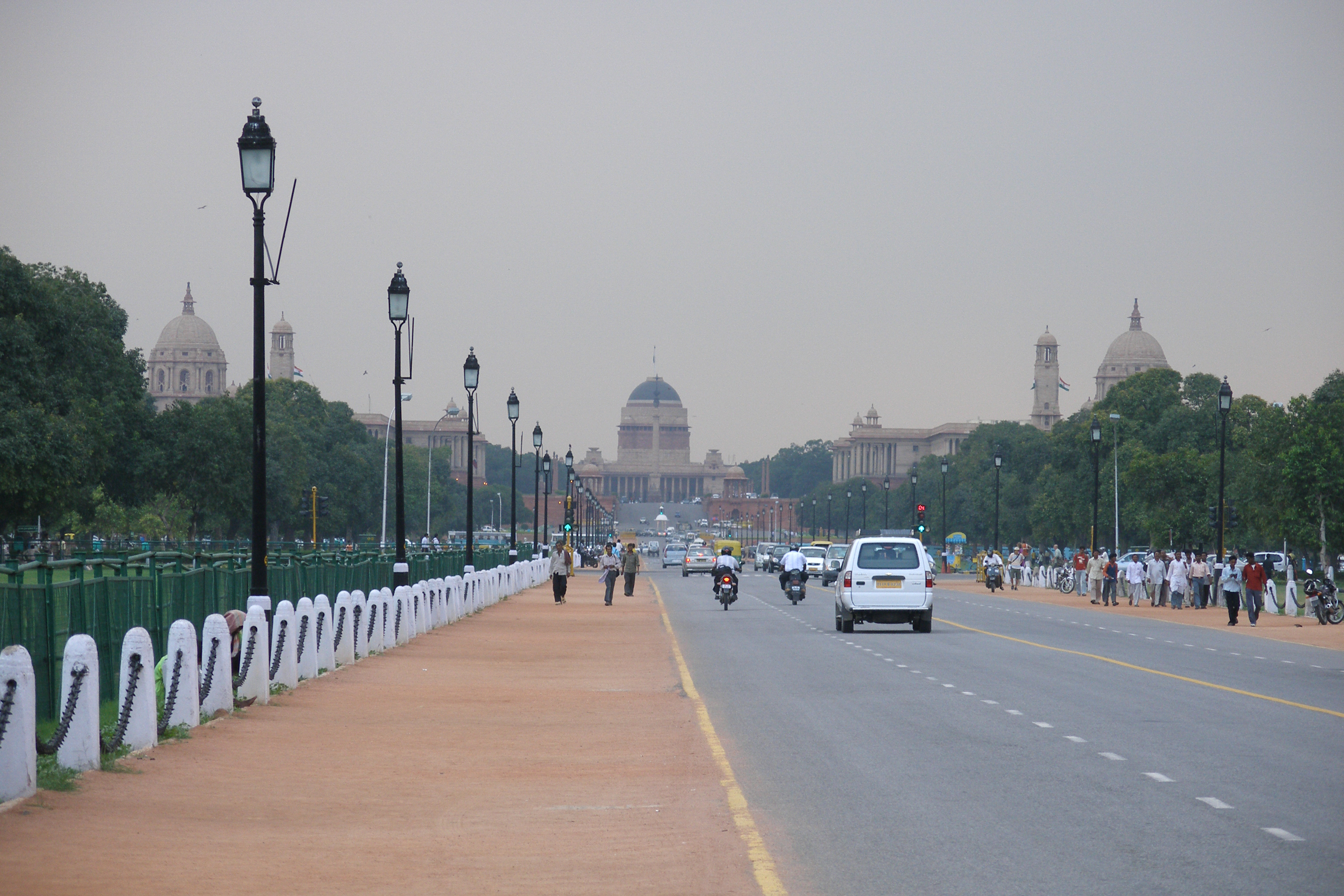
Panoramic view of Kartavya Path

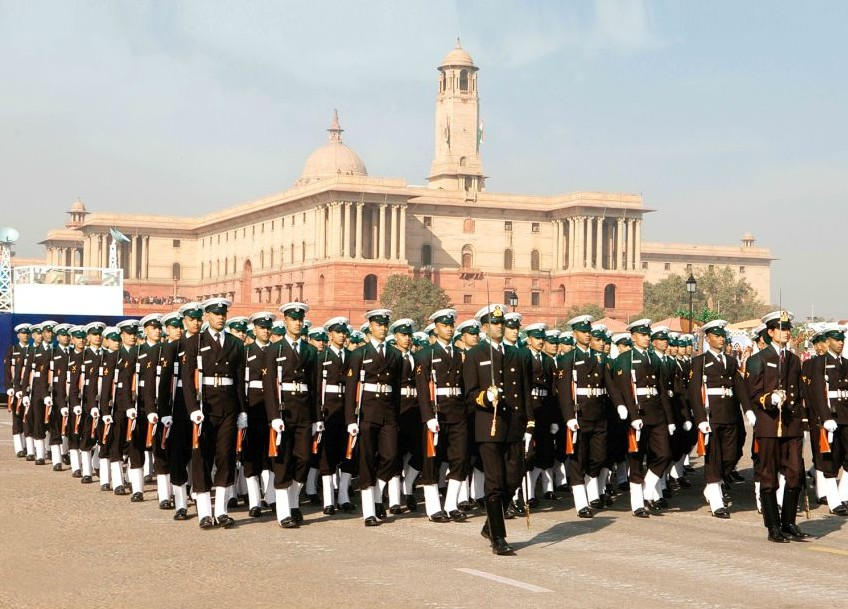
Indian Naval contingent marching on the Kartavya Path during Delhi Republic Day parade

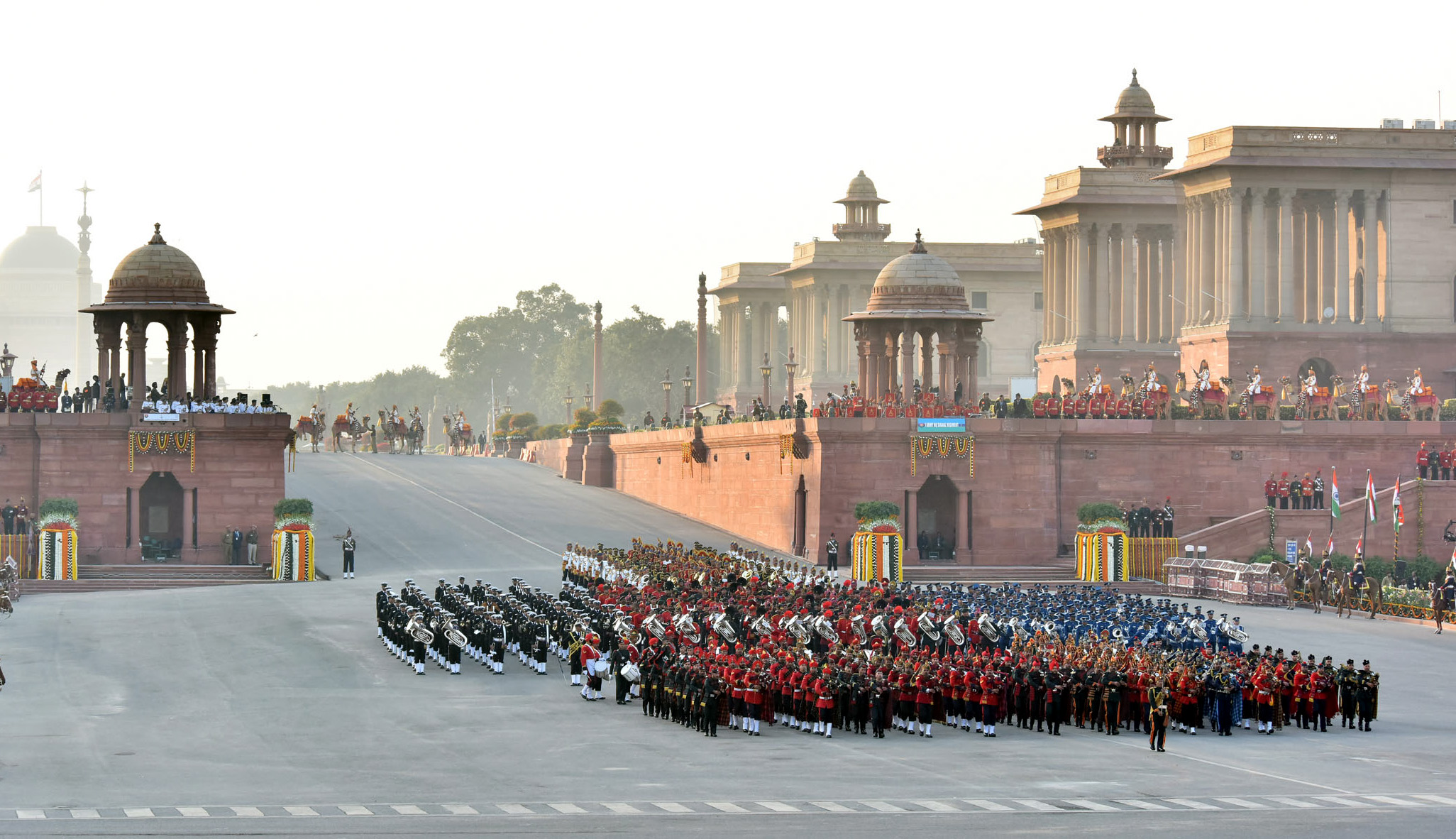
A band performance at India's Beat Retreat ceremony at Vijay Chowk in 2018.

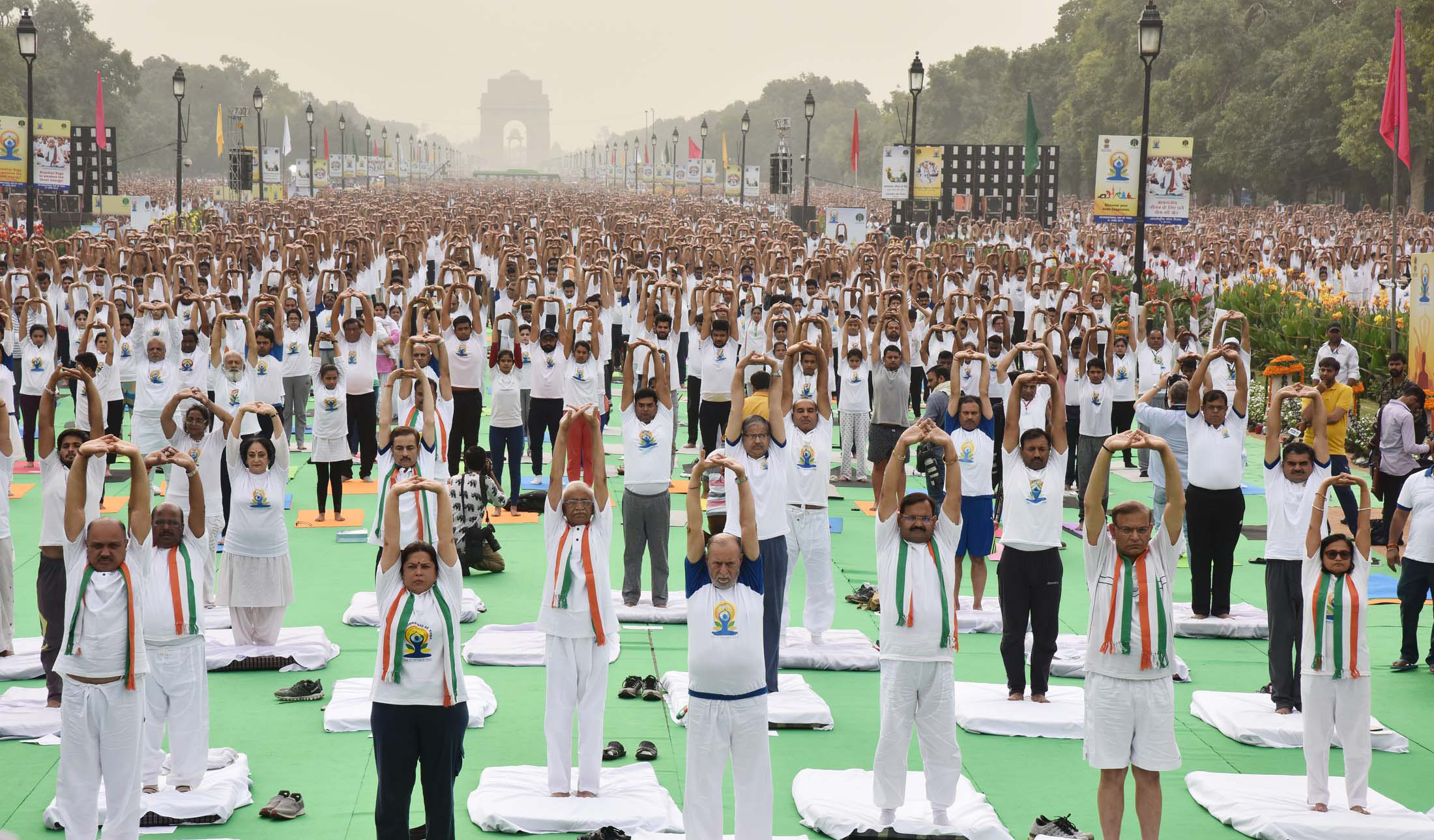
International Day of Yoga on 21 June 2018

== Delhi Metro ==
The nearest Delhi Metro stations to the Raisina Hill are: Central Secretariat, Lok Kalyan Marg, Udyog Bhawan, Janpath, Rajiv Chowk, Patel Chowk.

== See also ==
- Kartavya Path
- Lutyens' Delhi
- Raisina Dialogue
