= Mandi House metro station =

Metro station in Delhi, India

Mandi House

General information
- Location: Mandi House, New Delhi
- Coordinates: 28°37′33″N 77°14′05″E
- System: Delhi Metro station
- Owner: Delhi Metro
- Line: Blue Line Violet Line
- Platforms: Side platform (Blue Line); Platform-1 → Noida Electronic City / Vaishali; Platform-2 → Dwarka Sector 21; Island platform (Violet Line); Platform-3 → Raja Nahar Singh (Ballabhgarh); Platform-4 → Kashmere Gate
- Tracks: 4

Construction
- Structure type: Underground
- Platform levels: 2
- Accessible: Yes

Other information
- Station code: MDHS

History
- Opened: 11 November 2006; 20 years ago Blue Line; 26 June 2014; 12 years ago Violet Line
- Electrified: 25 kV 50 Hz AC through overhead catenary

Passengers
- Jan 2015: 8,265/day 256,225/ Month average

Services
Preceding station	Delhi Metro	Following station
Barakhamba Road towards Dwarka Sector 21	Blue Line	Supreme Court towards Noida Electronic City or Vaishali
ITO towards Kashmere Gate	Violet Line	Janpath towards Raja Nahar Singh (Ballabhgarh)
Route map
Location

The Mandi House metro station is an interchange station between the Blue Line and Violet Line of Delhi Metro. It services the cultural hub of Delhi, Mandi House, that hosts the National School of Drama, Ravindra Bhavan (home of Sangeet Natak Akademi and Sahitya Akademi), Shri Ram Centre for Performing Arts, Kamani Auditorium and Triveni Kala Sangam. Bengali Market is located in the vicinity as well.

== History ==
As part of Phase III of the Delhi Metro, Mandi House was converted into an interchange station to reduce congestion at Rajiv Chowk station. A 9.37 km (5.82 mi) underground extension connecting Central Secretariat to Kashmere Gate was opened in three phases. The section from Central Secretariat to Mandi House was opened on 26 June 2014, followed by the Mandi House–ITO section on 8 June 2015. The final section, from ITO to Kashmere Gate, was opened on 28 May 2017.

The existing Blue Line section used broad-gauge tracks, while the newly constructed Violet Line section uses standard-gauge tracks.

== See also ==
- List of Delhi Metro stations
- Transport in Delhi
- Delhi Metro Rail Corporation
- Delhi Suburban Railway
- List of rapid transit systems in India
