= ITO metro station =

Metro station in Delhi, India

ITO

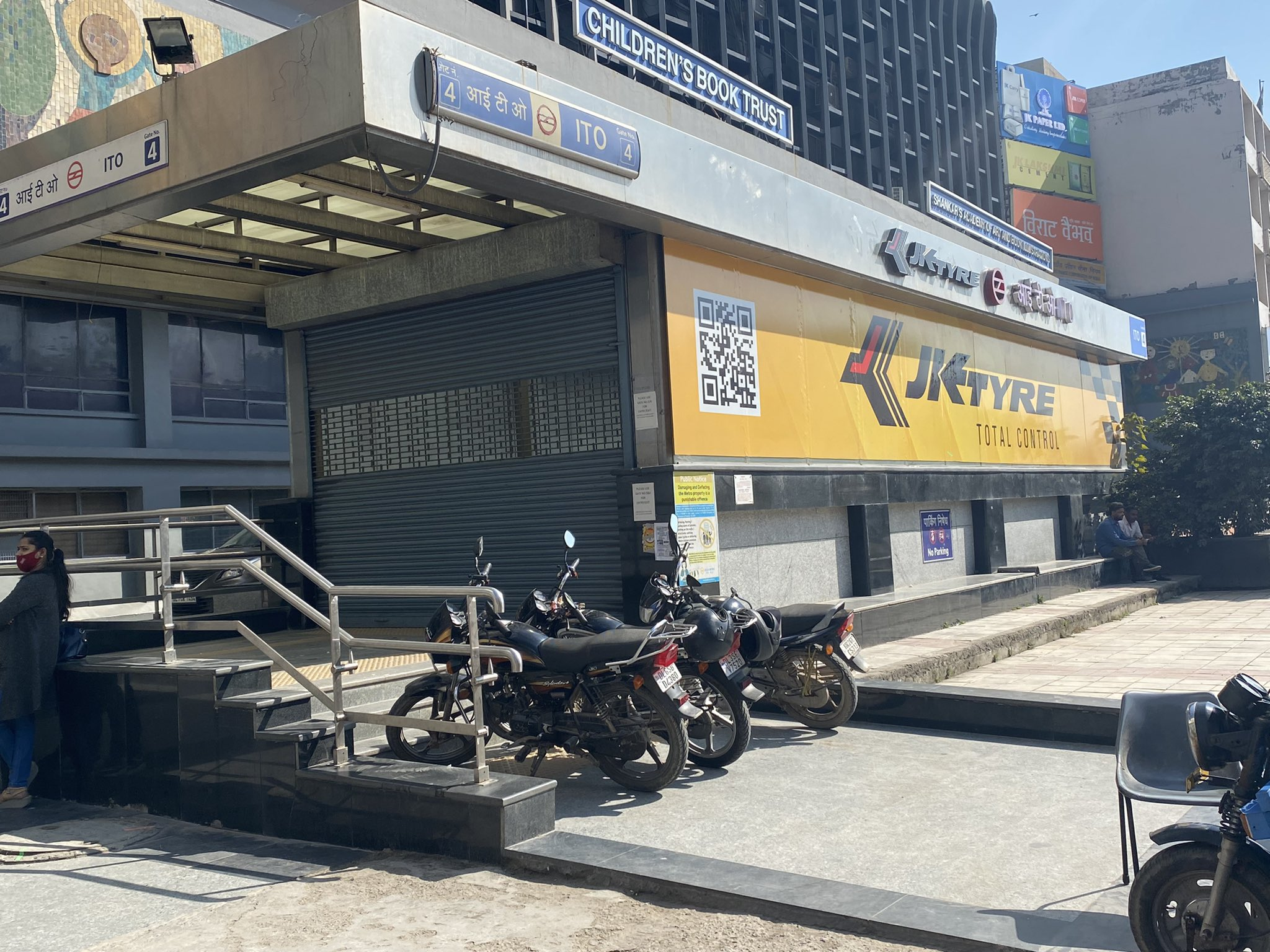

General information
- Location: Bahadur Shah Zafar Marg, ITO - Income Tax Office, New Delhi, Delhi - 110002
- Coordinates: 28°37′46″N 77°14′29″E
- System: Delhi Metro station
- Owner: Delhi Metro
- Operator: Delhi Metro Rail Corporation (DMRC)
- Line: Violet Line
- Platforms: Island platform; Platform-1 → Raja Nahar Singh (Ballabhgarh); Platform-2 → Kashmere Gate
- Tracks: 2

Construction
- Structure type: Underground, Double-track
- Platform levels: 2
- Accessible: Yes

Other information
- Station code: ITO

History
- Opened: 8 June 2015; 11 years ago
- Electrified: 25 kV 50 Hz AC through overhead catenary

Services
Preceding station	Delhi Metro	Following station
Delhi Gate towards Kashmere Gate	Violet Line	Mandi House towards Raja Nahar Singh (Ballabhgarh)
Route map
Location

ITO is an underground metro station on the Violet Line of the Delhi Metro, serving the busy ITO intersection in Central Delhi. It was inaugurated on 8 June 2015 by the then Union Urban Development Minister M. Venkaiah Naidu and Delhi Chief Minister Arvind Kejriwal. Passenger services commenced at 6 pm on the same day.

The ITO metro station was among the much-awaited stations of the Delhi Metro's Phase III expansion. The opening of Mandi House as an interchange station had earlier helped ease interchange congestion at Rajiv Chowk. The ITO station was expected to reduce vehicular traffic at the busy ITO intersection by encouraging office-goers and other commuters to use the Metro instead of private vehicles.

According to Delhi Traffic Police estimates reported in June 2015, more than 1.75 lakh (175 thousand) vehicles used the ITO intersection every day. The intersection serves as an important connecting point between East Delhi and other parts of the city and is known for heavy traffic congestion.

With the opening of the ITO metro station, a number of commuters working in offices located in the ITO area were expected to switch to the Metro. According to estimates by the Delhi Metro Rail Corporation (DMRC), approximately 22,000 passengers were expected to use the station daily by 2016. The number was projected to exceed 31,000 by 2021.

== History ==
ITO was the last station on the Heritage Line to be opened individually before the commissioning of the remaining section of the corridor. The Heritage Line continues northwards from ITO through four stations: Delhi Gate, Jama Masjid, Lal Qila and Kashmere Gate. These stations were initially expected to become operational in 2016, but the section was eventually opened to passengers on 28 May 2017.

Construction of the ITO metro station and the Mandi House–ITO section was nearing completion by December 2014, and trial runs began on 18 December 2014. However, passenger services on the 971 metres (0.603 mi) section could not commence because the Metro Railway General Rules, 2013 did not provide for safety inspections of single-line metro sections. In May 2015, the Ministry of Urban Development amended and notified changes to the rules to permit such operations. Following safety clearance from the Commissioner of Metro Rail Safety, the section was opened to the public on 8 June 2015.

Following its opening in June 2015, ITO served as the northern terminus of the Violet Line, which connected the area with South Delhi and Faridabad. It also provided connectivity to other parts of Delhi through interchange stations on the network. Passengers could access the Blue Line at Mandi House and the Yellow Line at Central Secretariat. The subsequent extension of the Violet Line to Kashmere Gate added further interchange connections with other lines of the Delhi Metro.

== The station ==
=== Station layout ===
G	Street level	Exit/ Entrance
C	Concourse	Fare control, station agent, Ticket/token, shops
P	Platform 1 Southbound	Towards → Raja Nahar Singh (Ballabhgarh); Next Station: Mandi House Change at the next station for Blue Line
P	Island platform | Doors will open on the right
P	Platform 2 Northbound	Towards ← Kashmere Gate; Next Station: Delhi Gate

== Entry/Exit ==
ITO metro station Entry/exits
Gate No-1	Gate No-2	Gate No-3	Gate No-4	Gate No-5	Gate No-6
Andhara School	Mata Sundari college	University Grants Commission	Passport Office	Delhi Police headquarters	CR Building
Gandhi Peace Foundation		Foreign Post Office			

== Nearby locations ==
The area surrounding the station houses several government offices and administrative institutions, including the Income Tax Office, Delhi Police Headquarters, Comptroller and Auditor General of India (CAG) and offices of various government departments. It is also home to offices of several prominent newspaper publishers and media organisations. Other nearby institutions and landmarks include Bal Bhawan, Shankar's International Dolls Museum, Gandharva Mahavidyalaya, Pearey Lal Bhawan and Maulana Azad Medical College.

- Media establishments: Business Standard, Economic Times, Times of India, ThePrint, The Hindu, BusinessWorld, The Pioneer, MBD Publications, Veer Arjun, Indian Express
- Leisure: Bal Bhawan, Shankar's International Dolls Museum
- Arts and culture: Hindi Bhawan, Gandharva Mahavidyalaya, Pearey Lal Bhawan auditorium, Children's Book Trust
- Government offices: Comptroller and Auditor General of India, University Grants Commission, Bureau of Indian Standards, Delhi Development Authority, Quality Council of India
- Offices of other national bodies: Indian National Science Academy, Institute of Chartered Accountants of India, Institution of Engineers(India) Delhi Local Centre, Indian Institute of Public Administration, School of Planning and Architecture, Delhi
- Offices of political organizations: Centre of Indian Trade Unions
- Hospital: Maulana Azad Medical College
- Historical monument: Feroz Shah Kotla

== Connections ==
=== Bus ===
Delhi Transport Corporation bus routes number 26, 135, 173, 274, 402CL, 403, 403CL, 404, 405, 405A, 405STL, 411, 419, 419LSTL, 423, 425CL, 429, 429CL, 447, 501, 502, 503, 621, 632, 722, 790, GL-22 serves the station from Lala R.C. Agarwal Chowk stop.

Delhi Transport Corporation bus routes number 73, 85, 85EXT, 85Ext, 135, 281, 310, 313, 317, 335, 336A, 340, 349, 349A, 375, 378, 390, 391, 418A, 418EXT, 623, 623A, 623B, 623EXT, 624ACL, 624BLnkSTL, 720, 723, 740, 740A, 740B, 740EXT, 770A, 910, 943, GL-22 serves the station from ITO bus stop.

=== Rail ===
The station is located near Tilak Bridge railway station, providing connectivity between the Delhi Metro and Indian Railways.

== See also ==
- Delhi
- List of Delhi Metro stations
- Transport in Delhi
- Delhi Metro Rail Corporation
- Delhi Suburban Railway
- Delhi Monorail
- Delhi Transport Corporation
- Central Delhi
- National Capital Region (India)
- List of rapid transit systems
- List of metro systems
