= Bengali Market =

Market in New Delhi, India

Coordinates: 28.62°N 77.23°E

Bengali Market is among the oldest and most popular markets in New Delhi, India. The actual name of the market is Bangali Mal Market, but over the years it has come to be known as just Bengali Market, though it has nothing to do with the Indian state of West Bengal. It was built by Bengali Mal Lohia in 1930. It is a relatively small market, comprising several stores situated in a circular manner around a traffic roundabout. Today, it is famous for its North Indian street food, and shops selling sweets such as Nathu's Sweets (sp.channa Bhature) and Bengali Sweet House.

Around 2000 families live in the immediate surrounding posh residential area, which is officially named Babar Road, however this area is also popularly referred to as Bengali Market. The Bengali Market area also includes Triveni Kala Sangam and Mandi House.

== Neighbouring areas ==
It is a cultural hub with many theatres, art galleries & important government buildings like Triveni Kala Sangam, National Museum for Natural History, Federation of Indian Chambers of Commerce & Industry - FICCI, Lalit Kala Academi, Shriram centre for Performing Arts, Kamani Auditorium, National School of Drama, National Green Tribunal etc.

This area is approx. 1km from Delhi's iconic British era market Connaught Place, underground market Palika Bazaar, and less than 3 km from seat of Indian Government around the India Gate area. Bengali market along with its neighbouring areas fall under the greater area of Lutyen's Delhi and has the very first pincode in India 110001.

== Transport ==
The nearest Delhi Metro station is Mandi House. The Delhi Metro station of Barakhamba road and Rajiv Chowk are also near by.

== Babar Road Controversy ==
Hindu Sena defaced Babar Road signage at Bengali Market, demanding it to be renamed. They claim that Babar did not belong to the country and was 'atrocious'. BJP leader, Vijay Goel claimed that the road will be renamed as '5 August Marg' in honor of Prime Minister Narendra Modi laying the foundation stone of Ram Temple in Ayodhya.

== Notable people ==
- Khushaleshwar Prasad Shankara, Indian politician, lawyer and trade unionist
