= Delhi Gate metro station =

Metro station in Delhi, India

Delhi Gate

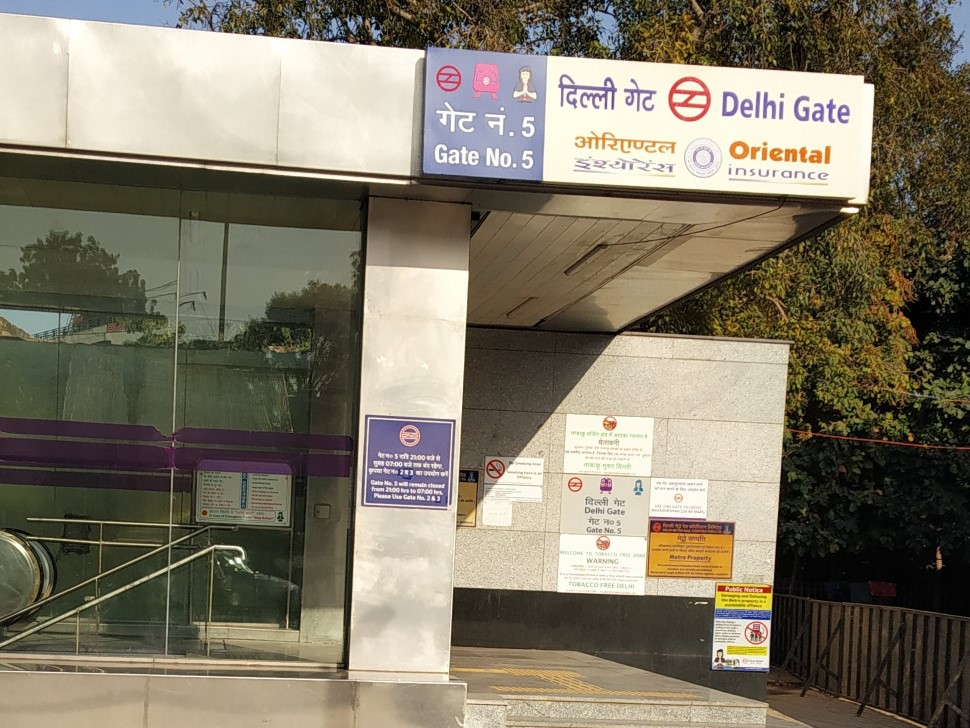

General information
- Location: Asaf Ali Rd, Chatta lal Miya, Chandni Mahal, Delhi Gate, Old Delhi, Delhi, 110006
- Coordinates: 28°38′24″N 77°14′25″E
- System: Delhi Metro station
- Owner: Delhi Metro
- Operator: Delhi Metro Rail Corporation (DMRC)
- Line: Violet Line Magenta Line
- Platforms: Island platform; Platform-1 → Raja Nahar Singh (Ballabhgarh); Platform-2 → Kashmere Gate
- Tracks: 2

Construction
- Structure type: Underground
- Platform levels: 2
- Accessible: Yes

Other information
- Station code: DLIG

History
- Opened: 28 May 2017; 9 years ago
- Electrified: 25 kV 50 Hz AC through overhead catenary

Services
Preceding station	Delhi Metro	Following station
Jama Masjid towards Kashmere Gate	Violet Line	ITO towards Raja Nahar Singh (Ballabhgarh)
Future Service
New Delhi towards Inderlok	Magenta Line	Delhi Sachivalaya towards Botanical Garden
Route map
Location

Delhi Gate is a station on the Delhi Metro system.

== The station ==
=== Station layout ===
G	Street level	Exit/Entrance
C	Concourse	Fare control, station agent, ticket/token, shops
P	Platform 1 Southbound	Towards → Raja Nahar Singh (Ballabhgarh); Next Station: ITO
P	Island platform | Doors will open on the right
P	Platform 2 Northbound	Towards ← Kashmere Gate; Next Station: Jama Masjid

== Connections ==
It has a connection of Arun Jaitley Stadium.

=== Bus ===
Delhi Transport Corporation bus routes number 19B, 39, 39A, 39STL, 88A, 114ST, 120B, 157STL, 171, 185, 210, 213, 214, 214CL, 246, 258SPL, 273, 307, 307A, 308, 309, 309EXT, 331LnkSTL, 729, 753, 773, 807A, 838, 853, 857, 901, 917, 918, 949, 949A, 949EXT, 954 serves the station.

=== Rail ===
New Delhi railway station of Indian Railways situated nearby.

== Entry/Exit ==
Delhi Gate metro station Entry/exits
Gate No-1	Gate No-2	Gate No-3	Gate No-4	Gate No-5
Maulana Azad Medical College	GB Pant Hospital	Daryaganj	Ambedkar Stadium	Arun Jaitley Stadium
Bahadurshah Jafar Marg				
Delhi Parsi Anjuman Guest House				

== See also ==
- Delhi
- List of Delhi Metro stations
- Transport in Delhi
- Delhi Metro Rail Corporation
- Delhi Suburban Railway
- Delhi Monorail
- Delhi Transport Corporation
- Central Delhi
- National Capital Region (India)
- List of rapid transit systems
- List of metro systems
