= Khushaleshwar Prasad Shankara =

Indian trade unionist

Kushaleshwar Prasad Shankara (Hindi: खुशहालीश्वर प्रसाद शंकर) was an Indian politician, lawyer and trade unionist.

Shankara was the secretary of the University Law Union Society. In 1936 he was one of founders of the Delhi Students Federation along with Kanwar Lal, Mir Mushtaq Ahmad, Ismail Madha and others.

Shankara stood as the Indian National Congress candidate in the Parliament Street constituency. He won the seat, having obtained 5,646 votes (67.21% of the votes in the constituency). As of 1954 he served as president of the Delhi branch of the Indian National Trade Union Congress.

He owned a house in the Bengali Market neighbourhood.
