= Arun Jaitley Cricket Stadium =

Cricket stadium in New Delhi

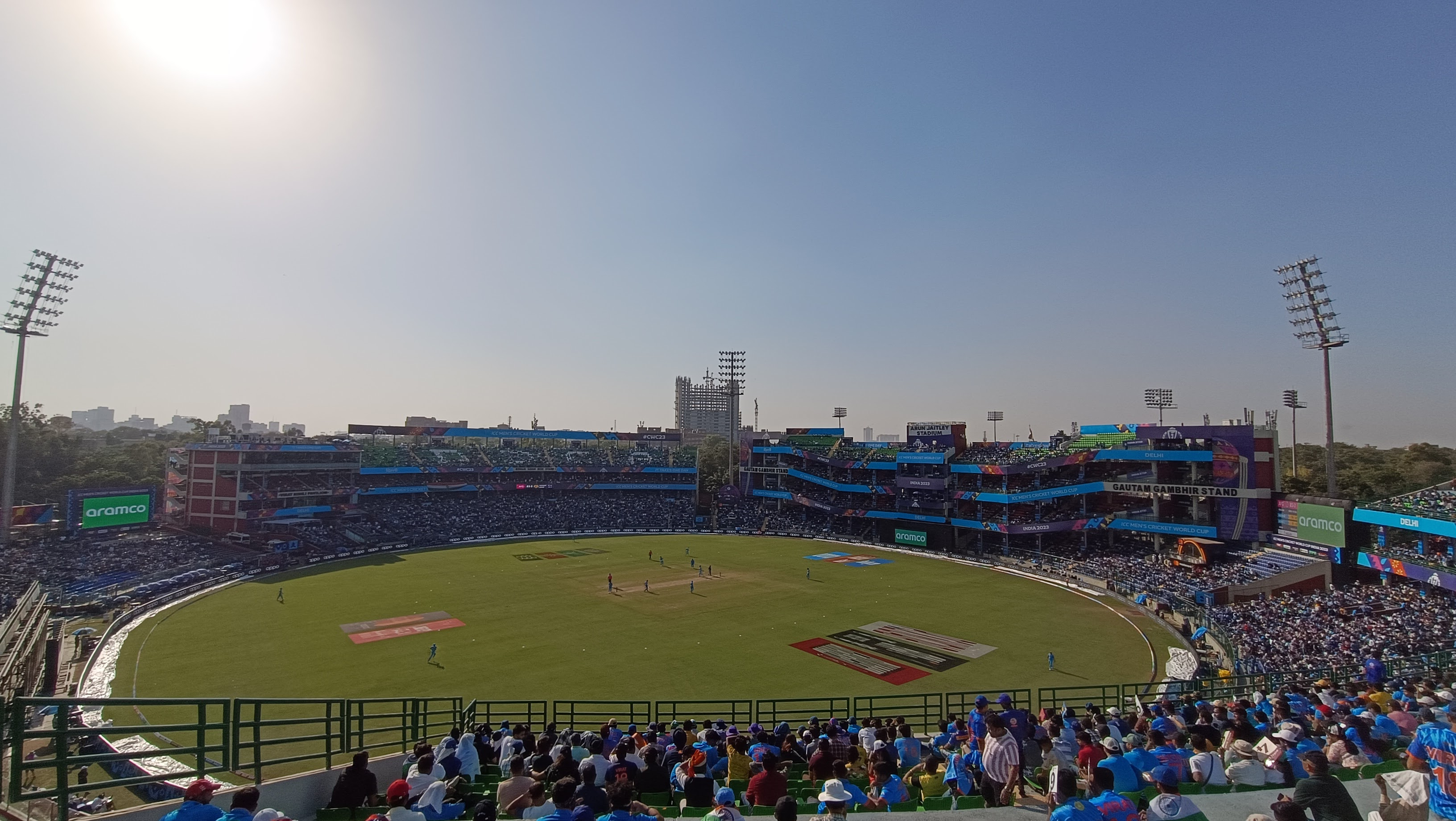
- Arun Jaitley Cricket Stadium, New Delhi
- Interactive map of Arun Jaitley Cricket Stadium
- Full name: Arun Jaitley Cricket Stadium
- Former names: Feroz Shah Kotla Stadium
- Address: Gates no.10-15, Eastern side, Feroz Shah Kotla Stadium, Jawaharlal Nehru Marg, Feroze Shah Kotla, Raj Ghat, 110002; New Delhi; India
- Location: Delhi-Ferozabad (historic city founded by Feroz Shah Tughlaq)
- Owner: Delhi & District Cricket Association
- Operator: Delhi & District Cricket Association
- Capacity: 41,000
- Surface: Grass (Oval)
- Public transit: Delhi Gate

Construction
- Opened: 1883 (143 years ago)
- Renovated: 2023
- Cost: ₹114.5 crore

Ground information
- Location: Bahadur Shah Zafar Marg, New Delhi
- Country: India
- Coordinates: 28°38′16″N 77°14′35″E
- Establishment: 1882
- Owner: Utpal Kant
- Tenants: India national cricket team Delhi cricket team Delhi Capitals; Delhi Capitals
- End names
- Stadium End Pavilion End

International information
- First men's Test: 10–14 November 1948: India v West Indies
- Last men's Test: 10–14 October 2025: India v West Indies
- First men's ODI: 15 September 1982: India v Sri Lanka
- Last men's ODI: 6 November 2023: Sri Lanka v Bangladesh
- First men's T20I: 23 March 2016: Afghanistan v England
- Last men's T20I: 13 September 2026: Afghanistan v India
- First women's Test: 12–14 November 1976: India v West Indies
- Last women's Test: 21–24 January 1984: India v Australia
- First women's ODI: 19 February 1985: India v New Zealand
- Last women's ODI: 19 September 2025: India v Australia
- First women's T20I: 15 March 2016: New Zealand v Sri Lanka
- Last women's T20I: 30 March 2016: New Zealand v England
- As of 9 October 2024; Source: ESPNcricinfo

The Arun Jaitley Cricket Stadium (formerly Feroz Shah Kotla Stadium) is a cricket stadium owned and operated by the Delhi & District Cricket Association (DDCA) and located on Bahadur Shah Zafar Marg, New Delhi, though part of Central Delhi, Delhi, India. It was established in 1883 as the Feroz Shah Kotla Stadium, and named after the nearby Kotla fort. It is situated on land that is a historical part of Ferozabad, the 14th-century city established by Sultan Feroz Shah Tughlaq in 1354 CE. It is within the fortified city and shares historical proximity with the surviving structures of the Kotla complex, such as the Jami Masjid. It is the second-oldest functional international cricket stadium in India, after the Eden Gardens of Kolkata. As of 12 February 2026, it has hosted 36 Tests, 29 ODIs, and 10 T20Is.

In a 2017 felicitation ceremony, the DDCA named four stands of the stadium after former India captain Bishan Singh Bedi, former India all-rounder Mohinder Amarnath, and former India and Delhi opener Gautam Gambhir. The home team's dressing room was named after the late Raman Lamba and the away dressing room after Prakash Bhandari.

On 12 September 2019, the stadium was renamed in memory of former DDCA President and Finance Minister Arun Jaitley after his death on 24 August 2019. The stadium was officially renamed at a function that took place on 12 September 2019. One of the stands of the stadium was named after former Indian captain Virat Kohli on the same date. The name change has been criticised by former Indian captain Bishan Singh Bedi. After announcing the name change, DDCA clarified that only the stadium had been renamed and that the ground would be still called the Feroz Shah Kotla Ground.

As of 2024, the India national cricket team had been undefeated for over 37 years in Test matches. India's 11-year unbeaten run in ODIs was brought to an end during New Zealand's tour of India in 2016-17 where New Zealand defeated India by 6 runs.

In September 2026, the ground was selected as the venue to host Afghanistan vs India 2026 in India. This is the first time Afghanistan hosted the T20I series as home side on Indian Soil against India.

== History ==
The first Test match at this venue was played on 10 November 1948 when India took on the West Indies.

=== Records ===
In 1952, playing against Pakistan, Hemu Adhikari and Ghulam Ahmed were involved in a record tenth wicket stand of 111 runs – a record that still stands. In 1965, S Venkataraghavan, in his debut series, demolished the New Zealand line-up with figures of 8 for 72 and 4 for 80. In 1969–70, Bishen Singh Bedi and Erapalli Prasanna combined to spin India to a famous seven-wicket win over Australia, the duo picking 18 wickets between themselves. In 1981, Geoff Boycott surpassed Gary Sobers' world record test aggregate.

In 1983, Sunil Gavaskar hit his 29th test ton in this ground to equal Don Bradman's then record tally of 29 centuries.

In 1999, Anil Kumble took all 10 wickets in an innings against Pakistan, to become only the second bowler to achieve this feat after Jim Laker.

In December 2005, Sachin Tendulkar scored his 35th test century against Sri Lanka to break Sunil Gavaskar record of the most test centuries.

=== 2009 dangerous pitch ===
On 27 December 2009, an ODI match between India and Sri Lanka was called off because pitch conditions were classed as unfit to host a match. Based on the match referee's report of the match, the ground was banned by the International Cricket Council (ICC) for 12 months. International cricket returned with the 2011 Cricket World Cup.

=== Indian Premier League ===
Since 2008, the stadium has been the home of the Delhi Capitals (formerly Delhi Daredevils) of the Indian Premier League.

=== 2017 Smog incident ===
During the second day of the third test of Sri Lankan cricket team in India in 2017-18 at Delhi, smog forced Sri Lanka cricketers to stop play and wear anti-pollution masks, a rare sight in terms of play interruptions. Cricketer Lahiru Gamage reported to have shortness of breath. Nic Pothas, coach of the Sri Lankan cricket team, reported that cricketer Suranga Lakmal had vomited regularly due to the severe pollution effect on the Delhi ground. There was a halt of play between 12:32 pm and 12:49 pm, which caused Indian coach Ravi Shastri to come out to consult with the on-field umpires. BCCI president C. K. Khanna accused the Sri Lankan team of making fuss while Indian spectators called the team "melodramatic". On day 4, India's Mohammed Shami was also seen vomiting on the field.

Following the match, both participating countries criticized the choice to play the Test in Delhi with the high levels of pollution. The Sri Lanka manager Asanka Gurusinha said that both teams were using oxygen cylinders in their dressing rooms due to breathing difficulties, and suggested the use of air-quality meters in future fixtures. President of the Indian Medical Association, KK Agarwal, said that playing in such conditions could result in lung and heart disease, and recommended the inclusion of atmospheric pollution as a factor in the assessment criteria for a match.

== Statistics ==
The Indian cricket team has won 10 test matches here to date out of 18 test matches. (Matches that have lost or won)

- Highest T20 powerplay score by SRH against Delhi Capitals :- 125/0
- Most successful team overall:- India - 10 wins
- Most successful visiting team:- England – 3 wins
- Highest Innings Score : 644/8 by West Indies on 6 February 1959
- Lowest Innings Score : 75 all out by India on 25 November 1987
- Wins Batting First : 5
- Wins Bowling First : 13
- Average Innings Score :285
- Most Runs : Sachin Tendulkar (759 runs)
- Highest Individual Score : 243 by Virat Kohli v Sri Lanka on 3 December 2017
- Most Successful Bowler : Anil Kumble (58 wickets)

== Various format records ==
=== Test record ===
The highest test score on this ground is by the West Indies, when they scored 644–8 in 1959 and 631 all out in 1948. The next highest score was made by India scoring 613–7 in 2008. The most runs scored here is by Dilip Vengsarkar (673 runs), followed by Sunil Gavaskar (668 runs) and Sachin Tendulkar (643 runs). The most wickets taken here is by Anil Kumble (58 wickets), followed by R Ashwin (33 wickets) and Kapil Dev (32 wickets).

=== ODI record ===
- Only twice had a team scored 300+ runs in an innings.
- The highest ODI total on this ground is 428/5, scored by South Africa against Sri Lanka at the 2023 Cricket World Cup.
- 15 batsmen have scored ODI centuries - Roy Dias (Sri Lanka), Sachin Tendulkar (India), Ricky Ponting (Australia), Nick Knight (England), AB de Villiers (South Africa), Virat Kohli (India), Kane Williamson (New Zealand), Usman Khawaja (Australia), Aiden Markram (South Africa), Rassie van der Dussen (South Africa), Quinton de Kock (South Africa), Rohit Sharma (India), David Warner (Australia), Glenn Maxwell (Australia) and Charith Asalanka (Sri Lanka).
- Viv Richards (West Indies) took 6 wickets against India in 1989.

==== Cricket World Cup ====
This stadium has hosted One Day International (ODI) matches when India hosted the Cricket World Cup in 1987, 1996, 2011 and 2023.

=== Twenty20 internationals ===
==== 2016 ICC World Twenty20 ====
The ground was selected to host matches in the 2016 ICC World Twenty20. Three matches from Group A were scheduled to be played here as well as one semi-final. The first ever Twenty20 International held at the ground was a Group A match between England and Afghanistan.

==== Indian cricket team matches ====
The ground hosted a T20I match on 1 November 2017 between India and New Zealand, the first ever Indian International Twenty-20 at this ground and also the last international match for Ashish Nehra. On the eve of his farewell game, the DDCA renamed one end of the Feroz Shah Kotla Ground as "Ashish Nehra End" for one day, making Nehra the second bowler in cricket history, after James Anderson (cricketer), to have bowled from an end named after him.

The first match of the Bangladesh tour of India 2019–20, the T20I in Delhi, was the 1,000th men's Twenty20 International match was played on 3 November 2019. Bangladesh won the match by seven wickets, to record their first-ever victory against India in the format.

== Accessibility ==
Road: Bahadur Shah Zafar Marg

Bus stops: Ambedkar stadium bus stop, Delhi gate bus stop, Saheed park bus stop, Ambedkar stadium terminal, Darya Ganj, Darya Ganj Golcha Cinema

Delhi Metro: Delhi Gate Metro Station

Indian Railways: Tilak Bridge railway station (TKJ)

Air: Indira Gandhi International Airport

== Gallery ==
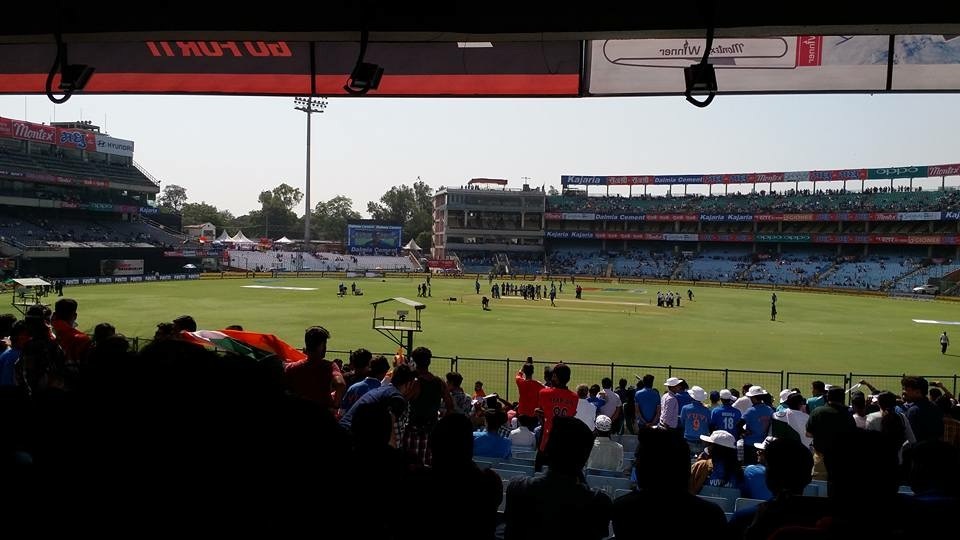
A match between India and New Zealand in 2016

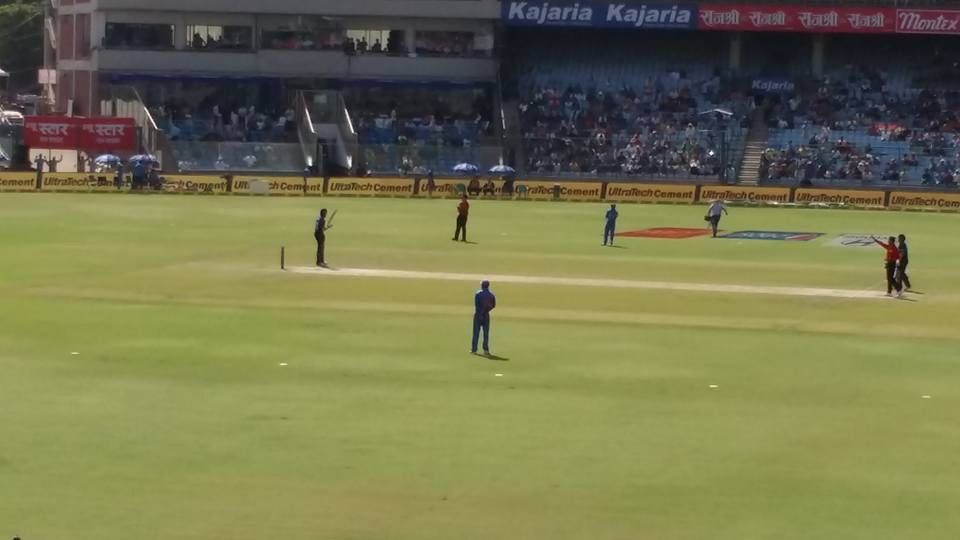

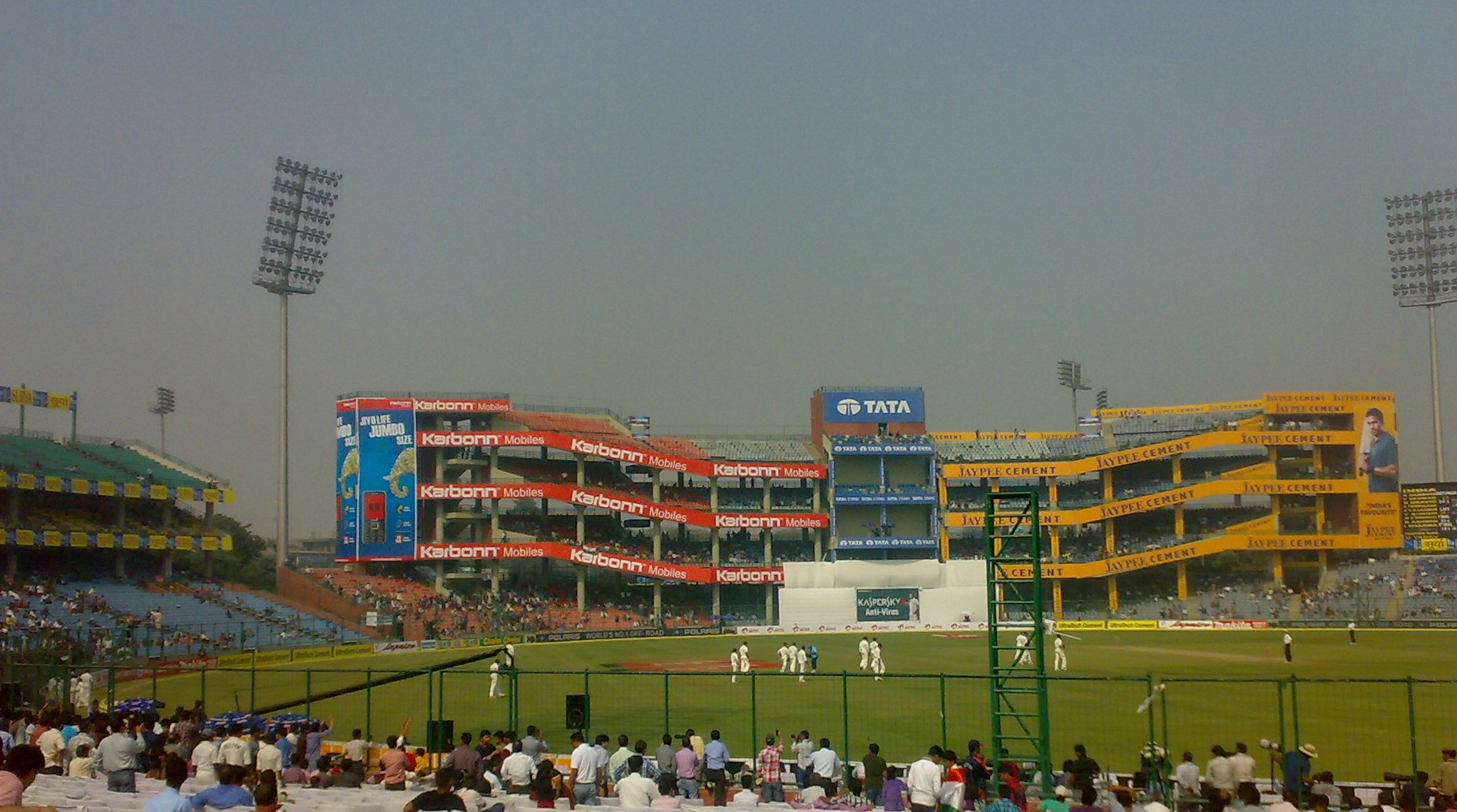

Arun Jaitley Stadium during World Cup 2023

== See also ==
- Lists of stadiums
- List of international cricket grounds in India
- List of Test cricket grounds
