= Patel Chowk metro station =

Metro station in Delhi, India

Patel Chowk

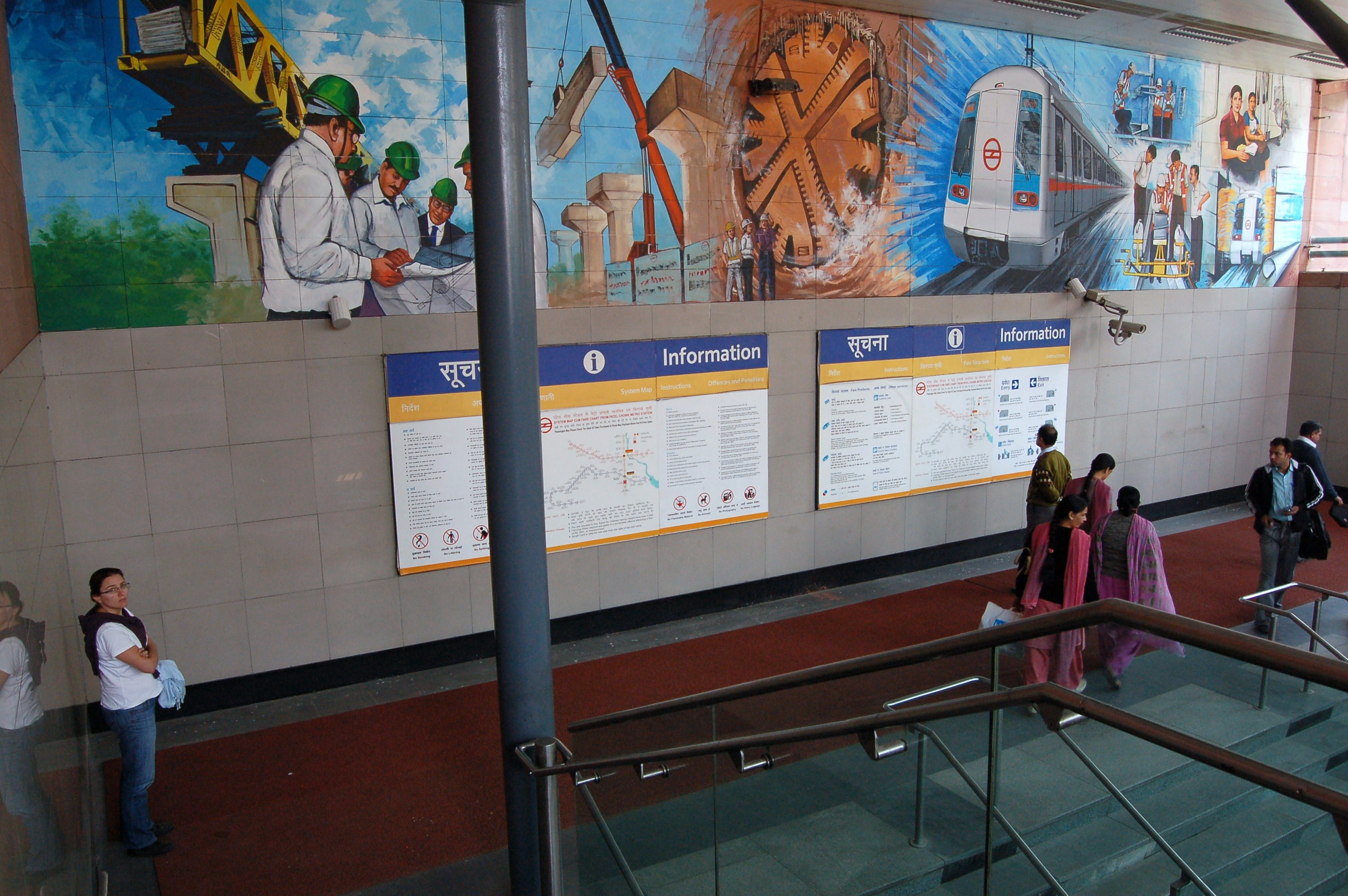
- The station entrance, 2008.

General information
- Location: Patel Chowk, New Delhi; India
- Coordinates: 28°37′24″N 77°12′42″E
- System: Delhi Metro station
- Owner: Delhi Metro
- Line: Yellow Line
- Platforms: Island platform; Platform-1 → Millennium City Centre Gurugram; Platform-2 → Samaypur Badli
- Tracks: 2

Construction
- Structure type: Underground
- Parking: 3 Parking lots
- Accessible: Yes

Other information
- Station code: PTCK

History
- Opened: 3 July 2005; 21 years ago
- Electrified: 25 kV 50 Hz AC through overhead catenary

Services
Preceding station	Delhi Metro	Following station
Rajiv Chowk towards Samaypur Badli	Yellow Line	Central Secretariat towards Millennium City Centre Gurugram
Route map
Location

The Patel Chowk metro station is located on the Yellow Line of the Delhi Metro.

It is the southernmost station on the Yellow Line in Delhi to have parking facilities. Cycles are also available for rent. The "Delhi Metro Rail Museum", which opened in 2010 was located at the concourse area of this station before moving to Supreme Court. This station is used for accessing places like Gurdwara Bangla Sahib, Kerala Bhawan, RML Hospital, Jantar Mantar, YMCA, YWCA and several major Govt offices like Dak Bhawan, Sanchar Bhawan, RBI Delhi, PTI, Yojana Bhawan, Akashvani Delhi, Election Commission of India etc.

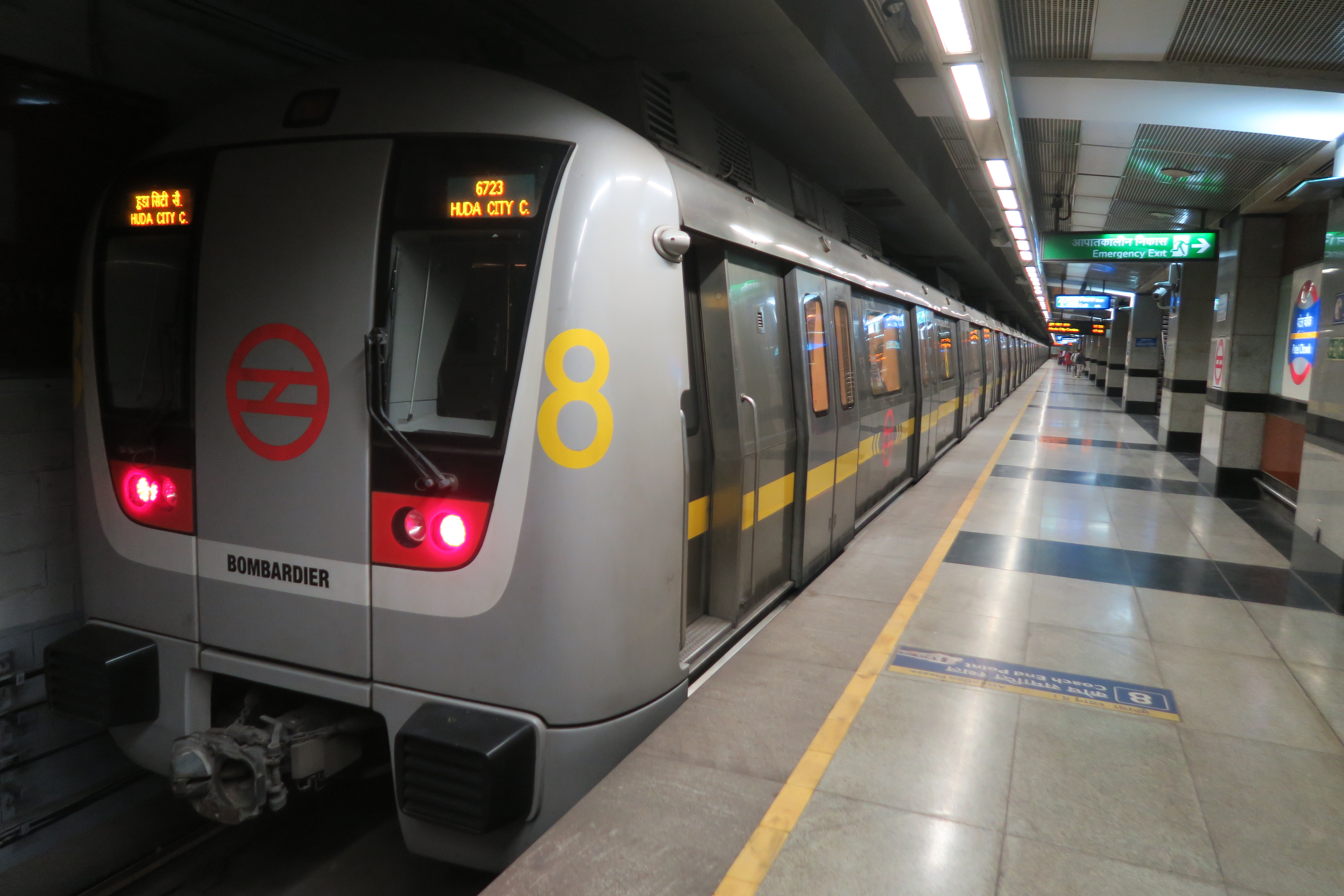
An eight-coach train leaves from Patel Chowk Metro Station

== Station layout ==
G	Street Level	Exit/ Entrance
C	Concourse	Fare control, station agent, Ticket/token, shops
P	Platform 1 Southbound	Towards → Millennium City Centre Gurugram; Next Station: Central Secretariat Change at the next station for Violet Line
P	Island platform | Doors will open on the right
P	Platform 2 Northbound	Towards ← Samaypur Badli; Next Station: Rajiv Chowk Change at the next station for Blue Line

== See also ==
- List of Delhi Metro stations
- Transport in Delhi
