= Barakhamba Road metro station =

Metro station in Delhi, India

Barakhamba Road

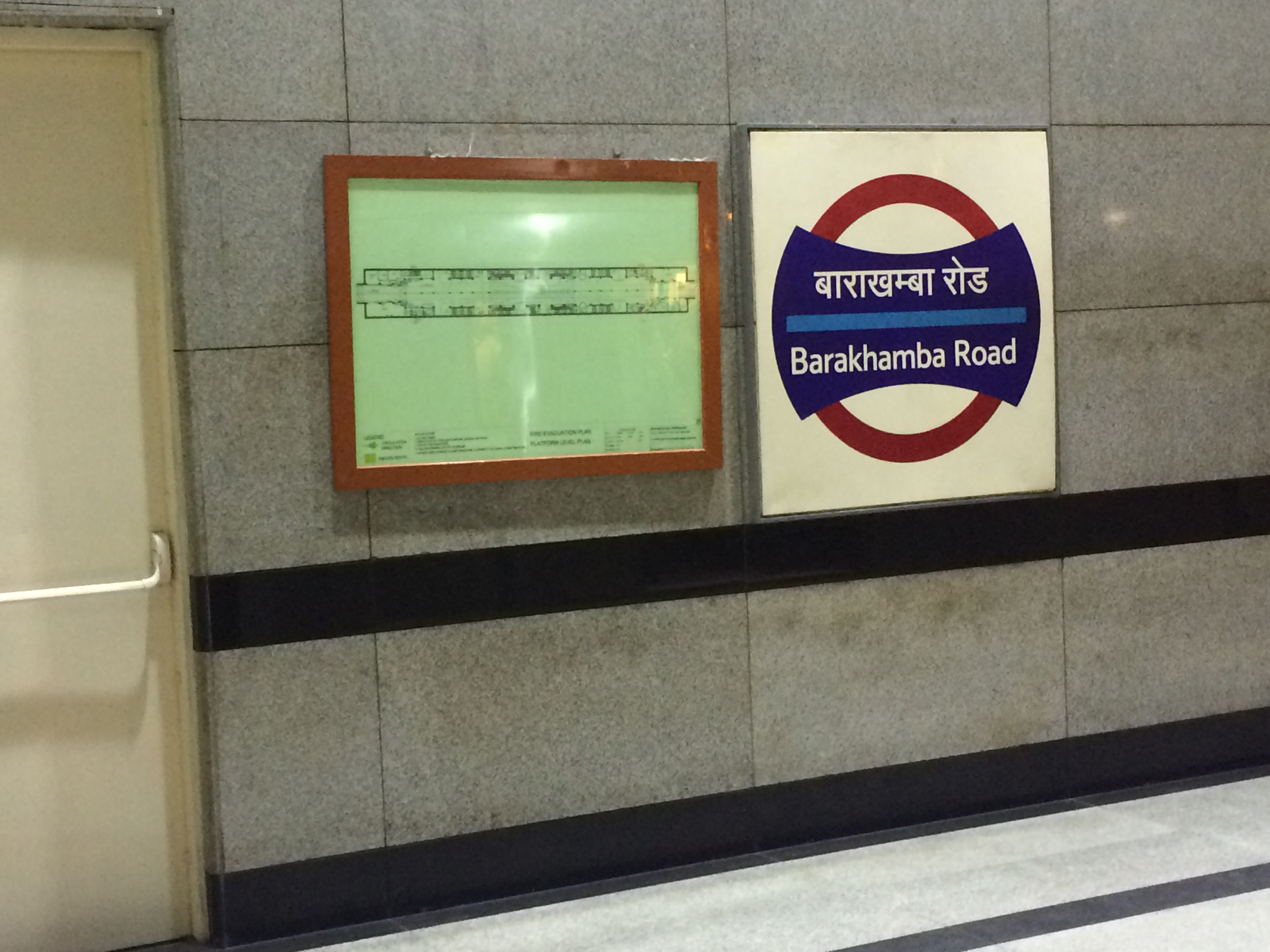

General information
- Location: Fire Brigade Lane, Barakhamba, New Delhi, 110001
- Coordinates: 28°37′48″N 77°13′28″E
- System: Delhi Metro station
- Owner: Delhi Metro
- Operator: Delhi Metro Rail Corporation (DMRC)
- Line: Blue Line
- Platforms: Side platform; Platform-1 → Noida Electronic City / Vaishali; Platform-2 → Dwarka Sector 21
- Tracks: 2

Construction
- Structure type: Underground, Double Track
- Accessible: Yes

Other information
- Station code: BRKR

History
- Opened: 31 December 2005; 20 years ago
- Electrified: 25 kV 50 Hz AC through overhead catenary

Services
Preceding station	Delhi Metro	Following station
Rajiv Chowk towards Dwarka Sector 21	Blue Line	Mandi House towards Noida Electronic City or Vaishali
Route map
Location

Barakhamba Road metro station is located on the Blue Line of the Delhi Metro. It was constructed by Afcons, a part of the Shapoorji Pallonji Group. The station is named after Barakhamba Road, which derives its name from a historical tomb known as Barah Khamba, believed to have been built during the 15th or 16th century.

The station is located on Barakhamba Road, near Modern School and Statesman House, a commercial building that houses several offices and banks. The Oxford Bookstore is also located nearby, at Dr. Gopal Das Bhawan.

== Structure ==
=== Station layout ===
G	Street level	Exit/Entrance
L1	Concourse	Fare control, station agent, Metro Card vending machines, crossover
L2	Side platform | Doors will open on the left
L2	Platform 1 Eastbound	Towards → Noida Electronic City / Vaishali; Next Station: Mandi House Change at the next station for Violet Line
L2	Platform 2 Westbound	Towards ← Dwarka Sector 21; Next Station: Rajiv Chowk Change at the next station for Yellow Line
L2	Side platform | Doors will open on the left
L2

== See also ==
- List of Delhi Metro stations
- Transport in Delhi
- Delhi Metro Rail Corporation
- Delhi Suburban Railway
- List of rapid transit systems in India
