= Jagatpur Village, Delhi =

Jagatpur village is a village, near Burari in Delhi, India. Jagatpur is one of 122 villages of Delhi, situated on the cities outskirts. The Yamuna River surrounds the village, sometimes causing floods.

== Background ==
There have been a number of recurrent floods in the history of this community that has led to resettlement and rehabilitation of the population. The village is rural in its socio-cultural aspects but because of its vicinity to NCT Delhi, it resembles a semi-urban community. The village has undergone many geographical, economic, cultural and social changes. Due to the increasing value of landholdings, the people of Jagatpur have started abandoning their traditional practice of cattle rearing in favor of alternatives better suited to the fast pace of economic growth. However, there is still a very significant population involved in cattle rearing, especially relative to Delhi.

== Governance ==
The community has a local Caste Panchayat. The representatives of the Panchayat are heads of the 26 Kunbas of the village. The community is inhabited primarily by Hindus, who constitute about 85% of the village population. The remaining population is composed of a small Muslim community. Gujjars are the native to the area with the rest of the population being composed of migrants from Uttar Pradesh & Bihar.

== Population ==
The population of Jagatpur is approximately 15,000 and is part of the Jharoda ward and Burari constituency. The village is secluded - it is characteristically rural and geographically isolated. The Jharoda ward has a population of 2.5 lakh, whereas the whole Jagatpur village has 15,000 (approx.) people, which makes the community politically vulnerable. There are mainly two societies formed by the villagers.

1. Bawa Singh Johai Memorial Trust
2. Lok Sewa Samiti

== Institutions ==
There is no Anganwadi within Jagatpur village, but there is one Anganwadi in the Jagatpur Extension area. Primary Health Center (PHC) - There is only one PHC [SPUHC Jagatpur (80)] in Jagatpur Extension but none in the Jagatpur village. This PHC runs inside a rented accommodation and lacks proper infrastructure.

== Sports ==
Sports are the primary entertainment and with the help of non-residents, two Kabaddi Tournaments are organized every year to youngsters to participate in sports. In addition, dog race competitions and ox race competitions are also held annually. Kabaddi is one of the oldest games played here and a talented number of Kabaddi players are present in the village. While efforts have been made to encourage an interest in traditional games, some youngsters still prefer Cricket and other popular sports.
