= Janpath metro station =

Metro station in Delhi, India

Janpath

General information
- Location: Janpath Rd, HC Mathur Lane, New Delhi, Delhi 110001
- Coordinates: 28°37′30″N 77°13′09″E
- System: Delhi Metro station
- Owner: Delhi Metro
- Line: Violet Line
- Platforms: Island platform; Platform-1 → Raja Nahar Singh (Ballabhgarh); Platform-2 → Kashmere Gate
- Tracks: 2

Construction
- Structure type: Underground
- Accessible: Yes

Other information
- Station code: JNPH

History
- Opened: 26 June 2014; 12 years ago
- Electrified: 25 kV 50 Hz AC through overhead catenary

Passengers
- 1,93,880: 6,254 (As of Jan 2015)

Services
Preceding station	Delhi Metro	Following station
Mandi House towards Kashmere Gate	Violet Line	Central Secretariat towards Raja Nahar Singh (Ballabhgarh)
Route map
Location

Janpath is a Delhi Metro station on the Violet Line under the metro's phase III expansion. It is part of a plan to introduce a parallel line to the busy Yellow Line corridor as well as provide quicker access to the Blue Line by connecting Mandi House and Central Secretariat. The station was opened on 26 June 2014.

== Completion ==
In April 2013, Delhi Metro rounded off the 1,516-metre tunnel on Mandi House-Janpath stretch of Phase-III expansion project. It took 182 days of excavation work to complete the tunnel. The 5.8 dia tunnel runs under some notable places like the American Centre, Nepal Embassy, Fulbright House, Antriksh Bhawan, Scindia House and Janpath Market to name a few.

The new metro station is targeted at easing the congestion at the Rajiv Chowk Metro station, which is bustling with more than 300,000 commuters every day. This phase three project will add an extra 140 km to Delhi's metro network, covering almost 75 percent of Delhi metropolis.

== Station layout ==
G	Street level	Exit/Entrance
C	Concourse	Fare control, station agent, Ticket/token, shops
P	Platform 1 Southbound	Towards → Raja Nahar Singh (Ballabhgarh); Next Station: Central Secretariat Change at the next station for Yellow Line
P	Island platform | Doors will open on the right
P	Platform 2 Northbound	Towards ← Kashmere Gate; Next Station: Mandi House Change at the next station for Blue Line

== See also ==
- List of Delhi Metro stations
- Transport in Delhi
- Delhi Metro Rail Corporation
- Delhi Suburban Railway
