= Central Secretariat metro station =

Metro station in Delhi, India

Central Secretariat केंद्रीय सचिवालय

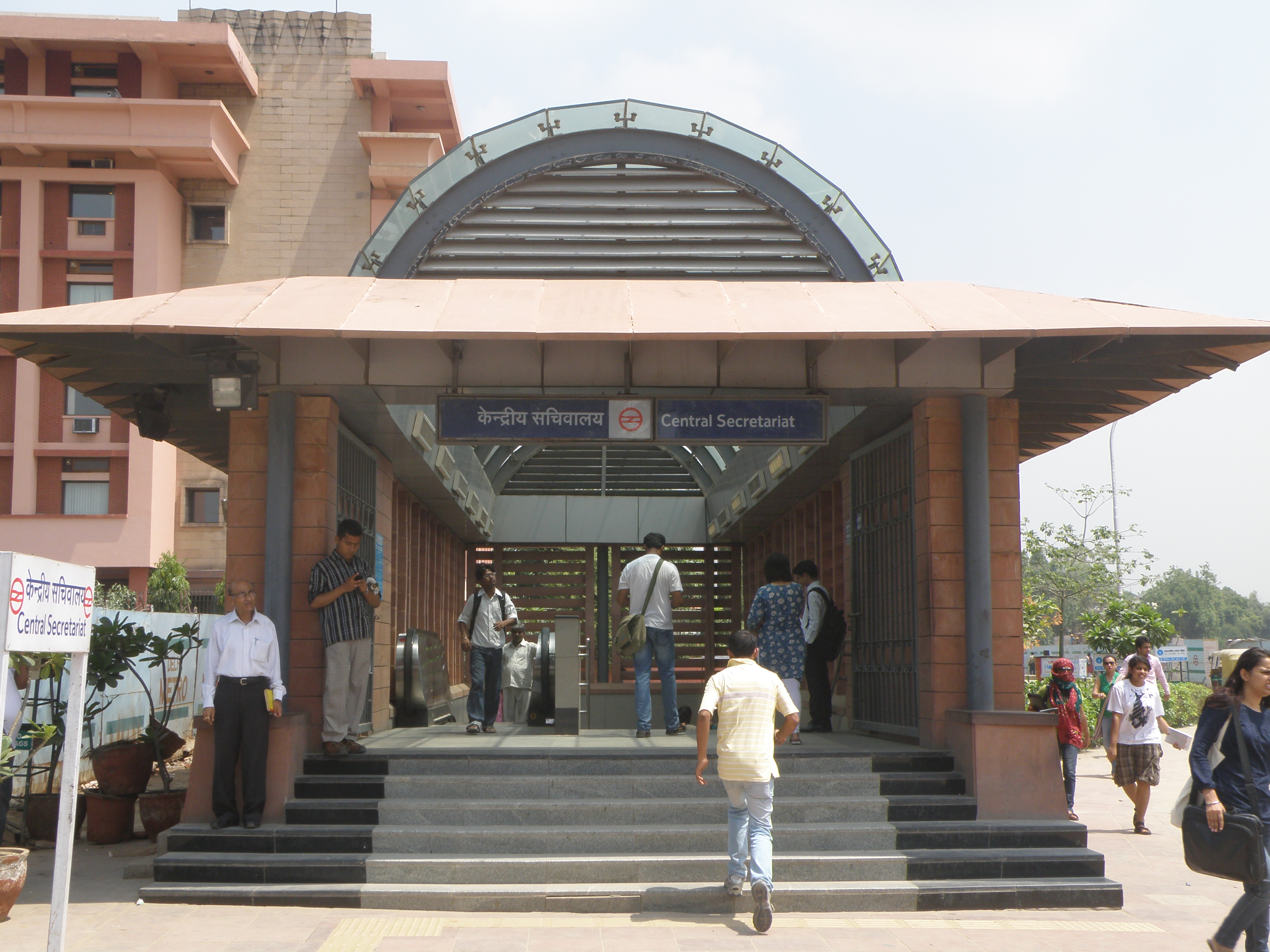
- Central Secretariat station entrance

General information
- Location: Kidwai Marg, Kartavya Path, Central Secretariat, New Delhi, Delhi, 110001; India
- Coordinates: 28°36′54″N 77°12′42″E
- System: Delhi Metro station
- Owner: Delhi Metro
- Line: Yellow Line Violet Line Magenta Line
- Platforms: Side platform; Platform-1 → Millennium City Centre Gurugram; Platform-2 → Samaypur Badli; Platform-3 → Raja Nahar Singh; Platform-4 → Kashmere Gate
- Tracks: 4

Construction
- Structure type: Underground
- Platform levels: 2
- Accessible: Yes

Other information
- Station code: CTST

History
- Opened: 3 July 2005; 21 years ago (Yellow Line); 3 October 2010; 16 years ago (Violet Line)
- Electrified: 25 kV 50 Hz AC through overhead catenary

Services
Preceding station	Delhi Metro	Following station
Patel Chowk towards Samaypur Badli	Yellow Line	Seva Teerth towards Millennium City Centre Gurugram
Janpath towards Kashmere Gate	Violet Line	Khan Market towards Raja Nahar Singh (Ballabhgarh)
Future Service
CCS Building towards Inderlok	Magenta Line	Yuge Yugeen Bharat towards Botanical Garden
Route map
Location

The Central Secretariat (often abbreviated as Central Sectt on platforms and trains) is a metro station of the Delhi Metro in New Delhi. It serves as an interchange station between the Yellow and Violet Lines. The station provides interchange facilities between the two lines at both platform and concourse levels. It was the southern terminus of the Yellow Line from 3 July 2005 to 3 September 2010, and the northern terminus of the Violet Line from 3 October 2010 to 26 June 2014.

Nearby landmarks include Krishi Bhawan, Parliament House, the Secretariat Buildings (North and South Blocks), and India Gate.

== Construction ==
=== Station ===
The construction of Central Secretariat's Violet Line station marked the first time an operational underground metro station was expanded to accommodate an interchange. It was also the first time an interchange facility was provided at both the concourse and platform levels. Each platform is 140 metres (460 ft) long and 6.5 metres (21 ft) wide.

=== Tunnel ===
The new underground station was constructed using the cut-and-cover technique. It has a height of 5.75 metres (18.9 ft) and a width of 5.2 metres (17 ft).

== Connections ==
Several DTC and cluster bus services operate from the nearby Kendriya Terminal, connecting it with areas across Delhi, including Nathu Pura, Karawal Nagar and Jagatpur.

== See also ==
- List of Delhi Metro stations
- Transport in Delhi
