= Rajiv Chowk metro station =

Metro station in Delhi, India

Rajiv Chowk

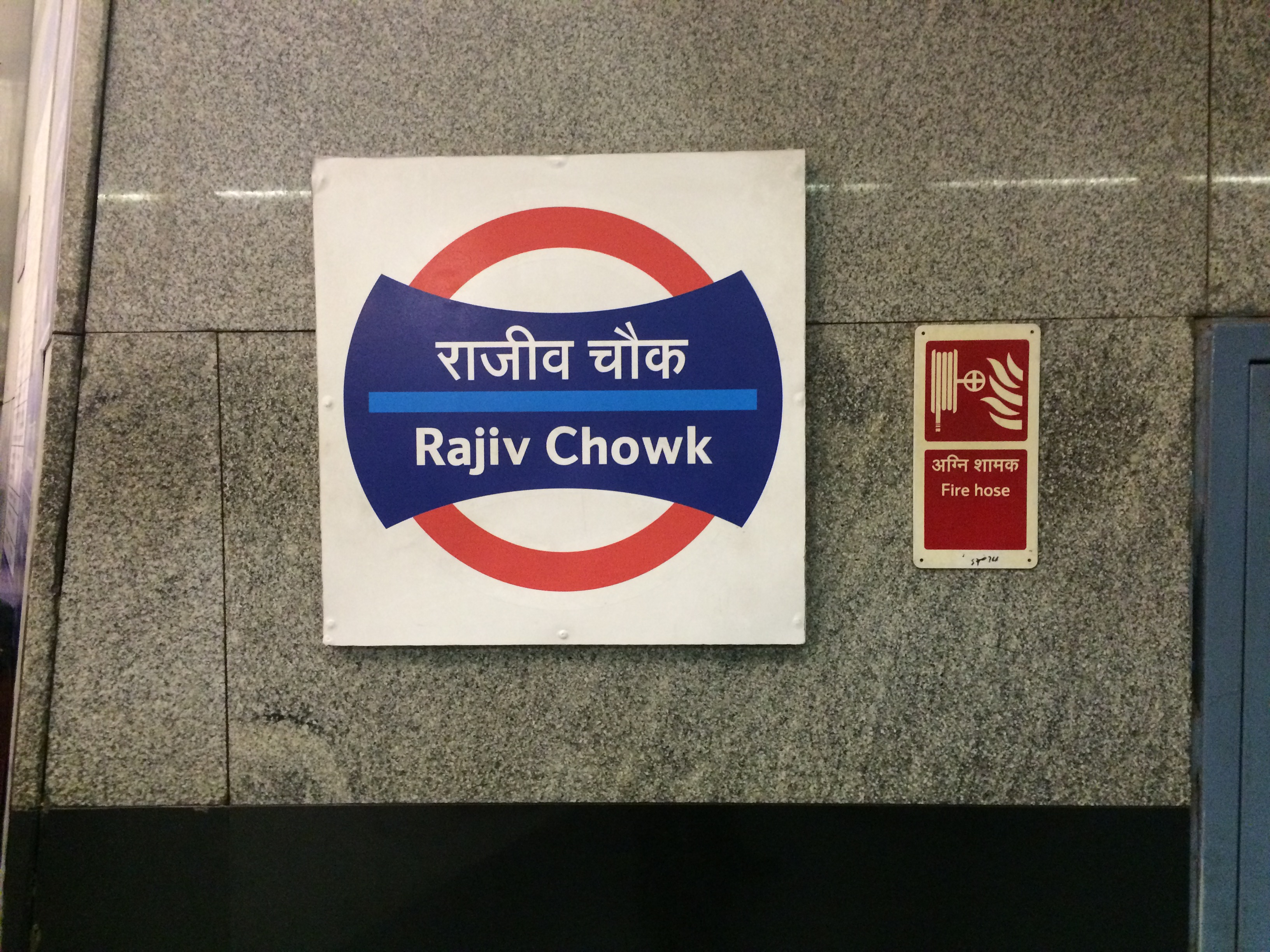

General information
- Location: Connaught Place, New Delhi; India
- Coordinates: 28°37′58″N 77°13′11″E
- System: Delhi Metro station
- Owner: Delhi Metro
- Line: Blue Line Yellow Line
- Platforms: Island platform (Yellow Line); Platform-1 → Millennium City Centre Gurugram; Platform-2 → Samaypur Badli; Side platform (Blue Line); Platform-3 → Noida Electronic City / Vaishali; Platform-4 → Dwarka Sector 21
- Tracks: 4

Construction
- Structure type: Underground
- Parking: Available
- Accessible: Yes

Other information
- Station code: RCK

History
- Opened: 3 July 2005; 21 years ago (Yellow Line); 31 December 2005; 20 years ago (Blue Line)
- Electrified: 25 kV 50 Hz AC through overhead catenary

Passengers
- October 2019: 241,712
- October 2023: 216,524 ▼10.4%

Services
| Preceding station | Delhi Metro | Following station |
|---|---|---|
| New Delhi towards Samaypur Badli | Yellow Line | Patel Chowk towards Millennium City Centre Gurugram |
| Ramakrishna Ashram Marg towards Dwarka Sector 21 | Blue Line | Barakhamba Road towards Noida Electronic City or Vaishali |
Route map
Location

Rajiv Chowk is an underground interchange station on the Yellow Line and Blue Line of the Delhi Metro, located beneath Central Park in Connaught Place, New Delhi. It connects the Samaypur Badli–Millennium City Centre Gurugram corridor of the Yellow Line with the Dwarka Sector 21–Noida Electronic City/Vaishali corridor of the Blue Line. The station has eight entry and exit gates serving different parts of Connaught Place.

Rajiv Chowk has historically been one of the busiest stations in the Delhi Metro network. In June 2026, it recorded an average daily footfall of approximately 211,000 passengers, ranking third among the network's busiest stations.

The station serves Connaught Place, one of New Delhi's principal commercial and business districts. It is located beneath Central Park, near the central plaza known as Rajiv Chowk.

== Station Layout ==
| Surface level | Street level | Entrances and Exits |
| UG Level-1 | Concourse | Fare control, station agent, Metro Card vending machines, crossover |
| UG Level-2 | Side platform | Doors will open on the left |
| UG Level-2 | Platform 3 Eastbound | Towards → Noida Electronic City / Vaishali; Next Station: Ramakrishna Ashram Marg |
| UG Level-2 | Platform 4 Westbound | Towards ← Dwarka Sector 21; Next Station: Barakhamba Road |
| UG Level-2 | Side platform | Doors will open on the left |
| UG Level-3 | Platform 2 Northbound | Towards → Samaypur Badli; Next Station: New Delhi; Change at the next station for Airport Express |
| UG Level-3 | Island platform | Doors will open on the right |
| UG Level-3 | Platform 1 Southbound | Towards ← Millennium City Centre Gurugram; Next Station: Patel Chowk |

== Entry/Exit ==
Rajiv Chowk metro station: Entry/Exits
| Gate No-1 | Gate No-2 | Gate No-3 | Gate No-4 | Gate No-5 | Gate No-6 | Gate No-7 | Gate No-8 |
|---|---|---|---|---|---|---|---|
| B Block / Radial Road-3 | PVR Plaza | D Block / Odeon Cinema | E Block / Barakhamba Road | N & F Block | Palika Bazar | A Block / Regal Cinema | A Block |

== Viewers' gallery ==
Viewers' gallery at the Rajiv Chowk station of Delhi Metro's Yellow Line

In August 2015, the Delhi Metro Rail Corporation (DMRC) opened the Viewers' Gallery at Rajiv Chowk station to facilitate passenger movement between its two sides. Located in the unpaid area of the station, the gallery allows commuters to reach the appropriate side without entering the paid area and crossing the internal foot overbridge. The facility was introduced to reduce congestion and unnecessary cross-movement of passengers within the station.

== See also ==
- Chennai Central metro station
- Kashmere Gate metro station
