= Rashtrapati Bhavan =

Official residence of the President of India

- Rāṣṭrapati Bhavan
- Rashtrapati Bhavan official logo

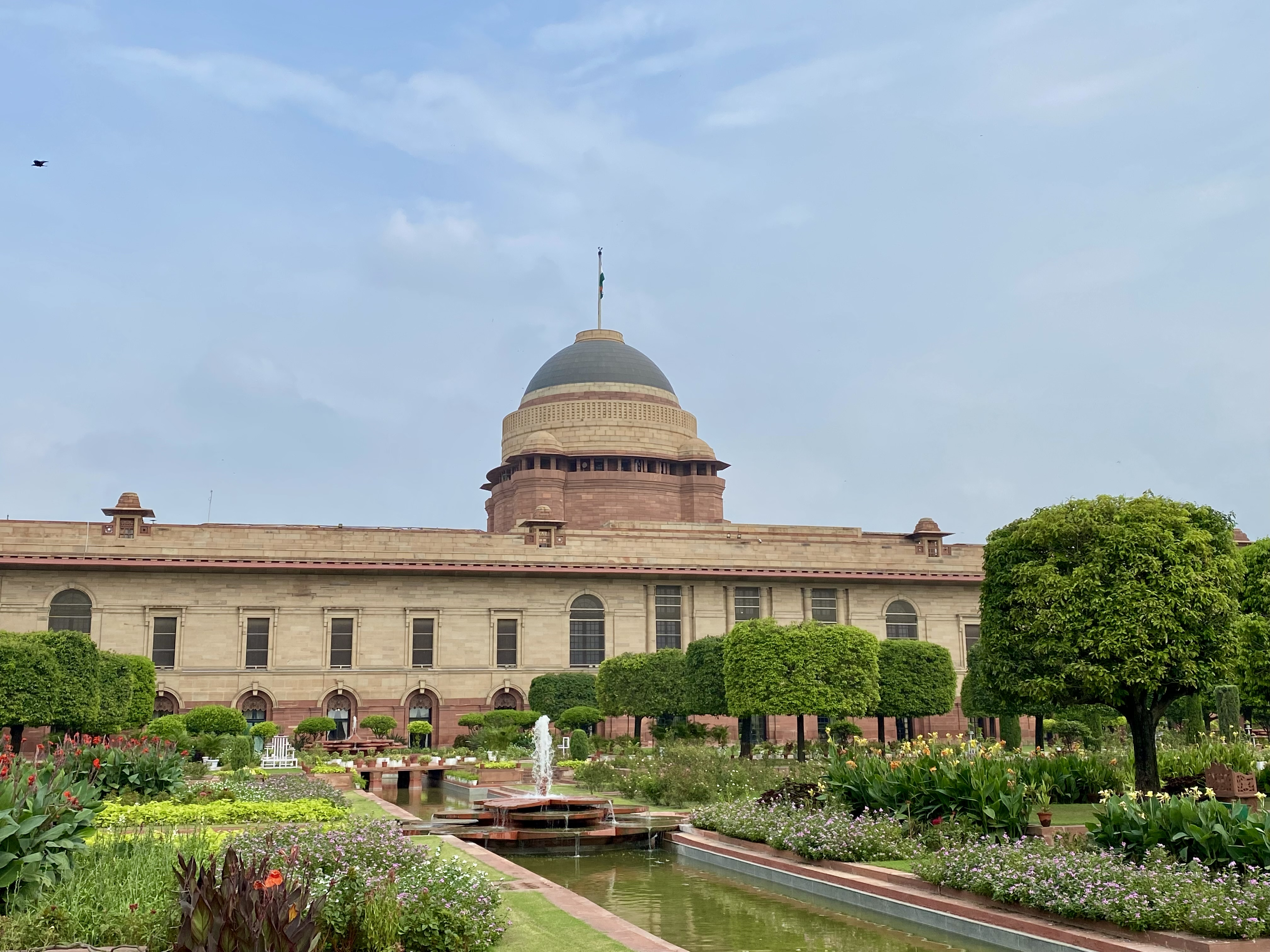
- Rashtrapati Bhavan

- Location within Delhi
- Former names: Viceroy's House (1931–1947); Government House (1947–1950)

General information
- Architectural style: Delhi Order
- Location: Rajpath, Raisina Hill, New Delhi, India
- Coordinates: 28°36′52″N 77°11′59″E
- Elevation: 215 m (705 ft)
- Current tenants: President of India
- Construction started: 1912; 114 years ago
- Completed: 1929; 97 years ago
- Opened: 1931; 95 years ago
- Owner: Government of India

Height
- Height: 55 m (180 ft)

Technical details
- Size: 320 acres (130 hectares)
- Floor count: Four
- Floor area: 200,000 square metres (2,200,000 sq ft)

Design and construction
- Architects: Edwin Lutyens; Herbert Baker

Other information
- Number of rooms: 340
- Public transit: Central Secretariat

Website
- rashtrapatibhavan.gov.in

Short film about Rashtrapati Bhavan

The Rashtrapati Bhavan (ISO: Rāṣṭrapati Bhavana; lit. 'President's House'), formerly Viceroy's House (1931–1947) and Government House (1947–1950) is the official residence of the President of India, located at the western end of Rajpath, Raisina Hill in New Delhi.

The building was designed by Edwin Lutyens and Herbert Baker in Delhi Order based on Indo-Saracenic architecture. The construction began in 1912 and the building was completed in 1929. The building, initially known as Viceroy's House, housed the Viceroy of India from 1931 until India's independence. After Independence, it briefly served as the Government House, housing the Governor General of India from 1947 to 1950. When India became a Republic, it became the official residence of the President of India and was renamed as the Rashtrapati Bhavan.

The main building is spread across four floors and a basement, consisting of 340 rooms and featuring a total of 2.50-kilometre-long corridors, spread across a floor area of 200,000 square metres (2,200,000 sq ft), including the President's official residence, reception halls, guest rooms and offices. It is situated in a 320 acres (130 hectares) presidential estate that includes gardens, open spaces, residences for security and staff, stables, offices and other utilities. With over 200,000 square metres (2,200,000 sq ft) of total usable floor area of the H-shaped main building, the Rashtrapati Bhavan is the largest official residence by total floor area of any head of state in the world, followed by, the Istana Nurul Iman in Brunei and the Quirinal Palace in Italy.

The Indian president has other residences across India including the Rashtrapati Niketan in Dehradun, the Rashtrapati Nilayam in Hyderabad, and the Rashtrapati Niwas in Shimla.

== History ==
The Governor-General of India resided at Government House in Calcutta until the shift of the imperial capital to Delhi. Lord Wellesley, who is reputed to have said that 'India should be governed from a palace, not from a country house,' ordered the construction of this grand mansion between 1799 and 1803 and in 1912, the Governor of Bengal took up residence there. The decision to build a residence in New Delhi for the British Viceroy was taken after it was decided during the Delhi Durbar in December 1911 that the capital of India would be relocated from Calcutta to Delhi. When the plan for a new city, New Delhi, adjacent to the southern end of Old Delhi, was developed after the Delhi Durbar, the new palace for the Viceroy of India was given an enormous size and a prominent position. About 4,000 acres (1,600 ha) of land was acquired to begin the construction of Viceroy's House, as it was originally called, and the adjacent Secretariat Building between 1911 and 1916 by relocating Raisina and Malcha villages that existed there and their 300 families under the Land Acquisition Act, 1894.

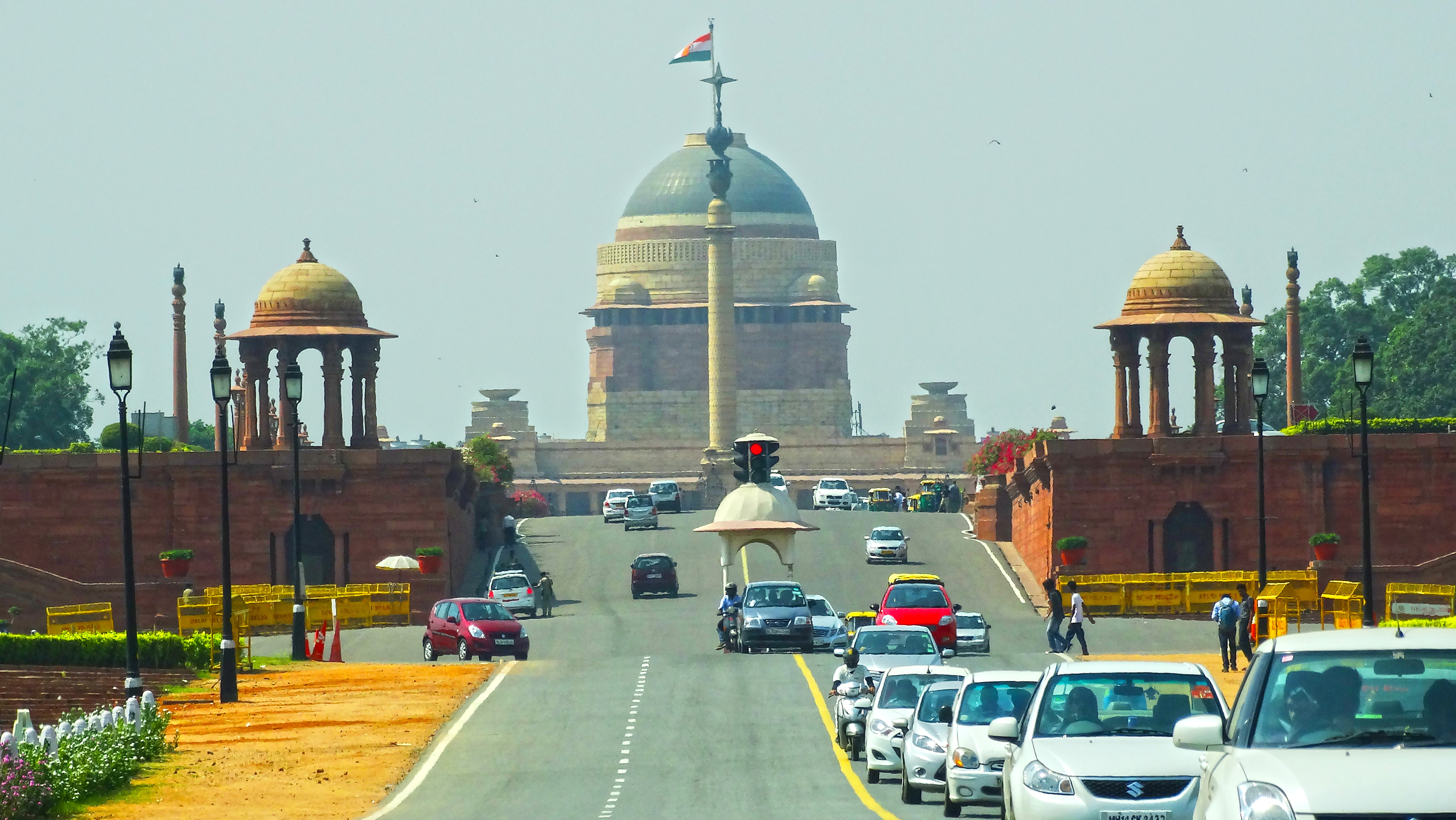
The sloping approach from the east

The British architect Edwin Lutyens, a major contributor to the city-planning process, was given the primary architectural responsibility. The completed Governor-General's palace turned out very similar to the original sketches which Lutyens sent to Herbert Baker, from Shimla, on 14 June 1912. Lutyens' design is grandly classical overall, with colours and details inspired by Indo-Saracenic architecture. Lutyens and Baker, who had been assigned to work on the Viceroy's House and the Secretariats, began on friendly terms. Baker had been assigned to work on the two Secretariat buildings that were in front of the Viceroy's House. The original plan was to have Viceroy's House on the top of Raisina Hill, with the secretariats lower down. It was later decided to build it 400 yards further back and put both buildings on top of the plateau.

Lutyens campaigned for its fixing but was not able to get it to be changed. Lutyens wanted to make a long inclined grade to Viceroy's House with retaining walls on either side. While this would give a view of the house from further back, it would also cut through the square between the secretariat buildings. The committee with Lutyens and Baker established in January 1914 said the grade was to be no steeper than 1 in 25, though it eventually was changed to 1 in 22, a steeper gradient which made it more difficult to see the Viceroy's palace. While Lutyens knew about the gradient and the possibility that the Viceroy's palace would be obscured by the road, it is thought that Lutyens did not fully realise how little the front of the house would be visible. In 1916 the Imperial Delhi committee dismissed Lutyens's proposal to alter the gradient. Lutyens thought Baker was more concerned with making money and pleasing the government, rather than making a good architectural design. The land was owned by Basakha Singh and mostly Sir Sobha Singh.

Lutyens travelled between India and England almost every year for twenty years and worked on the construction of the Viceroy's House in both countries. Lutyens reduced the building from 13,000,000 cubic feet (370,000 m^{3}) to 8,500,000 cubic feet (240,000 m^{3}) because of budget restrictions. The gardens were initially designed and laid out in Mughal style by William Robert Mustoe who was influenced by the Vicereine Lady Hardinge who in turn had sought inspiration in the book by Constance Villiers-Stuart in her Gardens of the Great Mughals (1913). The designs underwent changes and alterations under subsequent viceroys and after Indian Independence. After independence, it was renamed as Government House.

When Chakravarti Rajagopalachari assumed office as the first India-born Governor General of India and became the occupant of this palace, he preferred to stay in a few rooms in the former Guest Wing, which is now the family wing of the President; he converted the then Viceroy's apartments into the Guest Wing, where visiting heads of state stay while in India. On 26 January 1950, when Rajendra Prasad became the first President of India and occupied this building, it was renamed Rashtrapati Bhavan – the President's House.

The first restoration project at the Rashtrapati Bhavan was started in 1985 and ended in 1989, during which the Ashoka Hall was stripped of its later additions and restored to its original state by the architectural restorer Sunita Kohli. The second restoration project, begun in 2010, involved Charles Correa and Sunita Kohli.

A bust of Lutyens was removed from the building in a suggested act of decolonisation in 2026 and replaced by a bust of Chakravarti Rajagopalachari.

== Architecture ==
=== Design ===
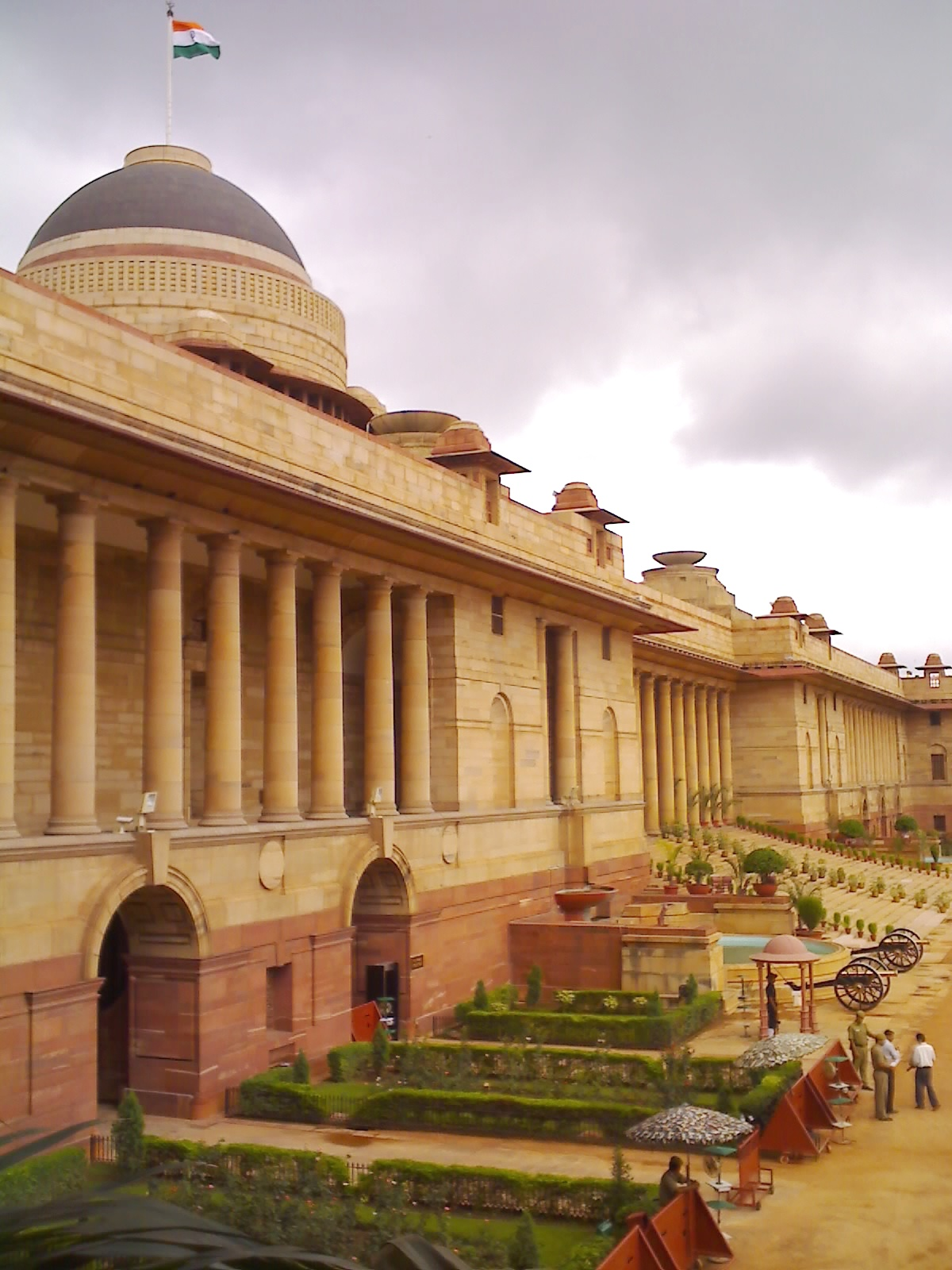
Main facade

Consisting of four floors and 340 rooms, with a floor area of 200,000 square metres (2,200,000 sq ft), it was built using 700 million bricks and 3,000,000 cu ft (85,000 m^{3}) of stone with little steel. The design of the building fell into the period of the Edwardian Baroque, a time at which emphasis was placed on the use of heavy classical motifs to emphasise power. The design process of the mansion was long, complicated and politically charged. Lutyens' early designs were all starkly classical and entirely European in style, although he wished to do it in classical Indian style – India never had a uniform architecture for public use. In the post-Mutiny era, however, it was decided that sensitivity must be shown to the local surroundings to better integrate the building within its political context, and after much political debate, Lutyens conceded to incorporating local Indo-Saracenic motifs, albeit in a rather superficial decoration form on the skin of the building.

Various Indian elements were added to the building. These included several circular stone basins on top of the building, as water features are an important part of Indian architecture. There was also a traditional Indian chujja or chhajja, which occupied the place of a frieze in classical architecture; it was a sharp, thin, protruding element which extended 8 feet (2.4 m) from the building, and created deep shadows. It blocks harsh sunlight from the windows and also shields the windows from heavy rain during the monsoon season. On the roofline were several chuttris, which helped to break up the flatness of the roofline not covered by the dome. Lutyens appropriated some Indian design elements but used them sparingly and effectively throughout the building.

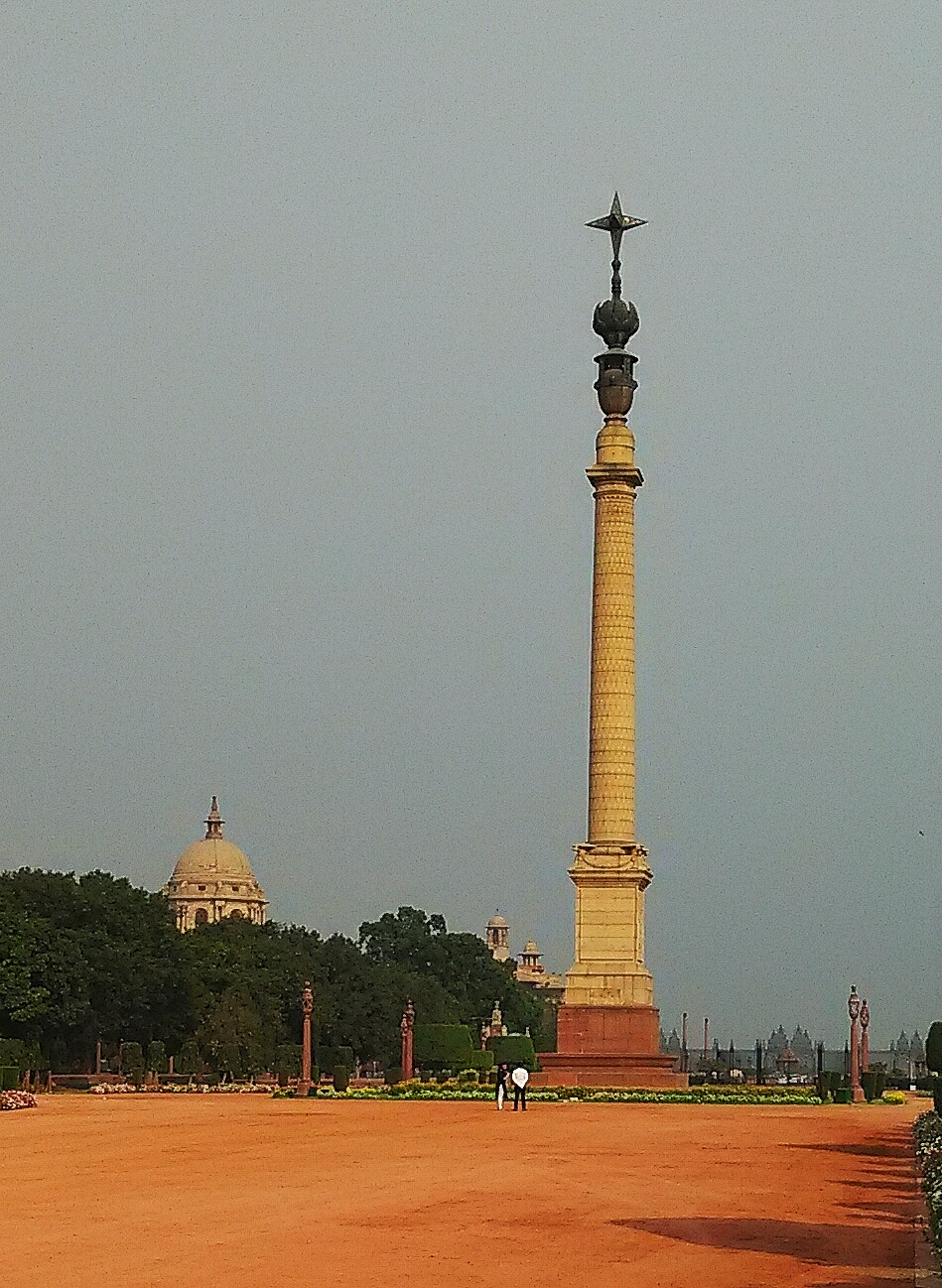
Jaipur Column

The column has a "distinctly peculiar crown on top, a glass star springing out of bronze lotus blossom". There were pierced screens in red sandstone, called jalis or jaalis, inspired by Rajasthani designs. The front of the palace, on the east side, has twelve unevenly spaced massive columns with the Delhi Order capitals, a "nonce order" Lutyens invented for this building, with Ashokan details. The capitals have a fusion of acanthus leaves with the four pendant Indian bells. The bells are similar in style to Indian Hindu and Buddhist temples, the idea is inspired by a Jain temple at Moodabidri in Karnataka.

One bell is on each corner at the top of the column. As there is an ancient Indian belief that bells signalled the end of a dynasty, it was said that as the bells were silent British rule in India would not end. Whereas previous British examples of so-called Indo-Saracenic Revival architecture had mostly grafted elements from Mughal architecture onto essentially Western carcasses, Lutyens drew also from the much earlier Buddhist Mauryan art. This can be seen in the Dehli Order, and in the main dome, where the drum below has decoration recalling the railings around early Buddhist stupas such as Sanchi. There is also the presence of Mughal and European colonial architectural elements. Overall the structure is distinctly different from other contemporary British Colonial symbols, although other New Delhi buildings, such as the Secretariat Building, New Delhi, mainly by Herbert Baker, have similarities e.g. both are built with cream and red Dholpur sandstone.

Lutyens added several small personal elements to the house, such as an area in the garden walls and two ventilator windows on the stateroom to look like the glasses which he wore. The Viceregal Lodge was completed largely by 1929, and (along with the rest of New Delhi) inaugurated officially in 1931. Between 1932 and 1933 important decorations were added, especially in the ballroom, and executed by the Italian painter Tommaso Colonnello.

It has 340 decorated rooms and a floor area of 200,000 square metres (2,200,000 sq ft). The structure includes 700 million bricks and 3.5 million cubic feet (85,000 m^{3}) of stone, with only minimal usage of steel. Lutyens established ateliers in Delhi and Lahore to employ local craftsmen. The chief engineer of the project was Sir Teja Singh Malik, and four main contractors included Sir Sobha Singh. There were also statues of elephants and fountain sculptures of cobras, as well as the bas-reliefs around the base of the Jaipur Column, made by British sculptor, Charles Sargeant Jagger.

== Layout plan ==
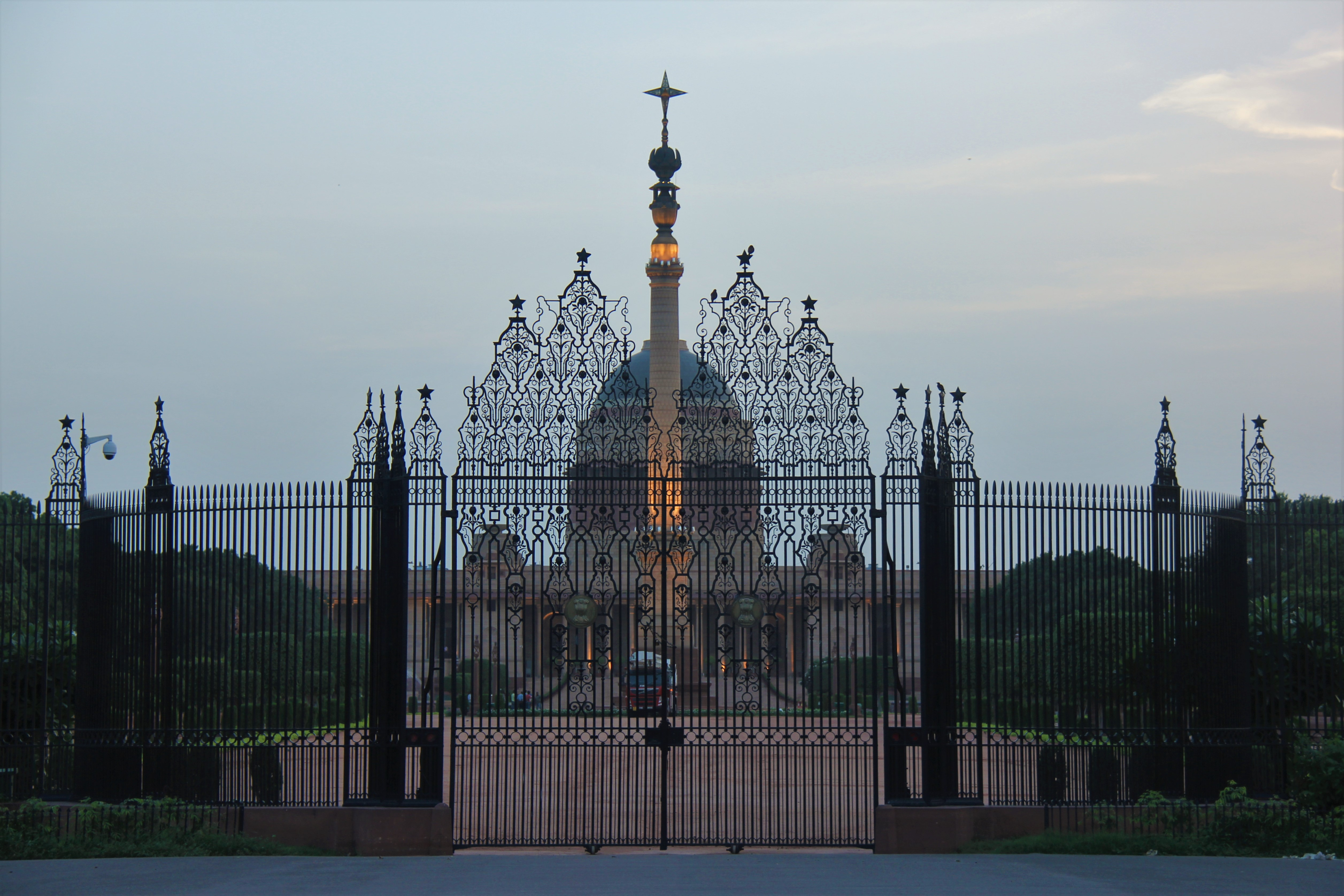
Main gate of Rashtrapati Bhawan with Jaipur Column in background

The layout plan of the building is designed around a massive square with multiple courtyards and open inner areas within. The plan called for two wings; one for the Viceroy and residents and another for guests. The residence wing is a separate four-storey house in itself, with its court areas within. This wing was so large that the last Indian governor-general, Chakravarti Rajagopalachari, opted to live in the smaller guest wing, a tradition followed by subsequent presidents. The original residence wing is now used primarily for state receptions and as a guest wing for visiting heads of state.

=== Halls and rooms ===
==== Gantantra Mandap ====
Gantantra Mandap (formerly: Durbar Hall) is situated directly under the double-dome of the main building. Known as the "Throne Room" before independence, it had two separate thrones for the Viceroy and Vicereine. Since Indian Independence, a single high chair for the President is kept here under a Belgian glass chandelier hanging from a height of 33 m. The flooring of the hall is made of chocolate-coloured Italian marble. The columns in Gantantra Mandap are made in Delhi Order which combines vertical lines with the motif of a bell. The vertical lines from the column were also used in the frieze around the room, which could not have been done with one of the traditional Greek orders of columns. The columns are made from yellow Jaisalmer marble, with a thick line running along the centre.

Gantantra Mandap has a capacity of 500 people and it is here in this building that Jawaharlal Nehru took the oath of office of Prime Minister from Lord Mountbatten at 8.30 am on 15 August 1947.

==== Ashoka Mandap ====
Ashoka Mandap (formerly: Ashoka Hall) is a rectangular room of 32×20 m. It was originally built as a state ballroom with wooden flooring. The Persian painting on its ceiling is the Fath-Ali Shah at the Hunt, a Qajar era oil painting realised by Mehr Ali. It depicts a royal hunting expedition led by King Fath-Ali Shah Qajar. The walls have fresco paintings conceptualised by the Italian artist Tommaso Colonnello, inspired from miniature schools such as the Persian miniature.

=== Dome ===
The dome, in the middle, reflects both Indian and British styles. In the centre is a tall copper-faced dome, surmounting a very tall drum in several sections, which stands out from the rest of the building. The dome is exactly in the middle of the diagonals between the four corners of the building. It is more than twice the height of the building itself and combines classical and Indian styles. Lutyens considered the Pantheon in Rome as a model when designing the dome, although the exterior of the dome was also modelled partly after the early Buddhist stupas.

== Amrit Udyan ==
The Amrit Udyan (meaning: Nectar Garden), is a garden situated at the back of the Rashtrapati Bhavan. From Mughal Gardens, it was rechristened to Amrit Udyan in January 2023 by President Draupadi Murmu as part of the 75th Anniversary of Indian Independence celebrations. The garden incorporates both Mughal and English landscaping styles and feature a great variety of flowers and trees. The Rashtrapati Bhavan gardens are open to the public in February–March every year during Udyanotsav.

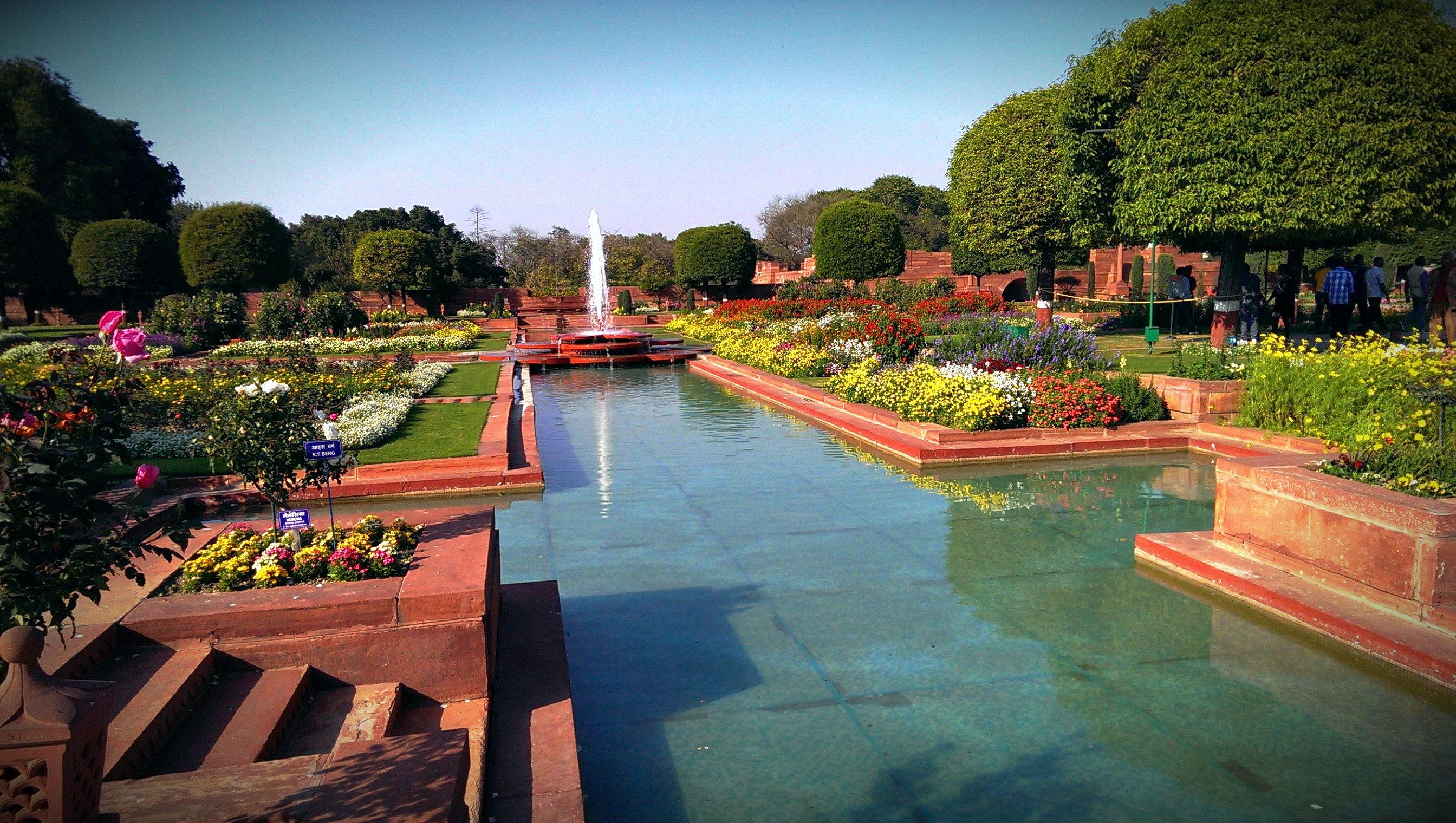
A fountain in the Amrit Udyan

The main garden consists of two channels intersecting at right angles running in the cardinal directions divide this garden into a grid of squares: a charbagh. There are six lotus-shaped fountains at the crossings of these channels, rising to a height of 12 feet (3.7 m). There are bird tables for feeding grain to wild birds.

There are two longitudinal strips of the garden, at a higher level on each side of the Main Garden, forming the Northern and Southern boundaries. The plants grown are the same as in the Main Garden. At the centre of both of the strips is a fountain, which falls inwards, forming a well. On the Western tips are located two gazebos and on the Eastern tips are two ornately designed sentry posts.

The Long Garden (or the Purdah Garden) is located to the West of the Main Garden, and runs along each side of the central pavement which goes to the circular garden. Enclosed in walls about 12 feet high, this is predominantly a rose garden. It has 16 square rose beds encased in low hedges. There is a red sandstone pergola in the centre over the central pavement which is covered with Rose creepers, Petrea, Bougainvillea and vines. The walls are covered with creepers like jasmine, Rhynchospermum, Tecoma Grandiflora, Bignonia Vanista, Adenoclyma, Echitice, Parana Paniculata. Along the walls are planted the China Orange trees.

== Museum ==
In July 2014, a museum inside Rashtrapati Bhavan was inaugurated by then President of India Pranab Mukherjee. The museum helps visitors to get an inside view of the Rashtrapati Bhavan, its art, architecture and get educated about lives of past presidents. The second phase was inaugurated in 2016 by the President Pranab Mukherjee and the Prime Minister Narendra Modi. The museum has been built under the guidance of Saroj Ghose.

== Gallery ==
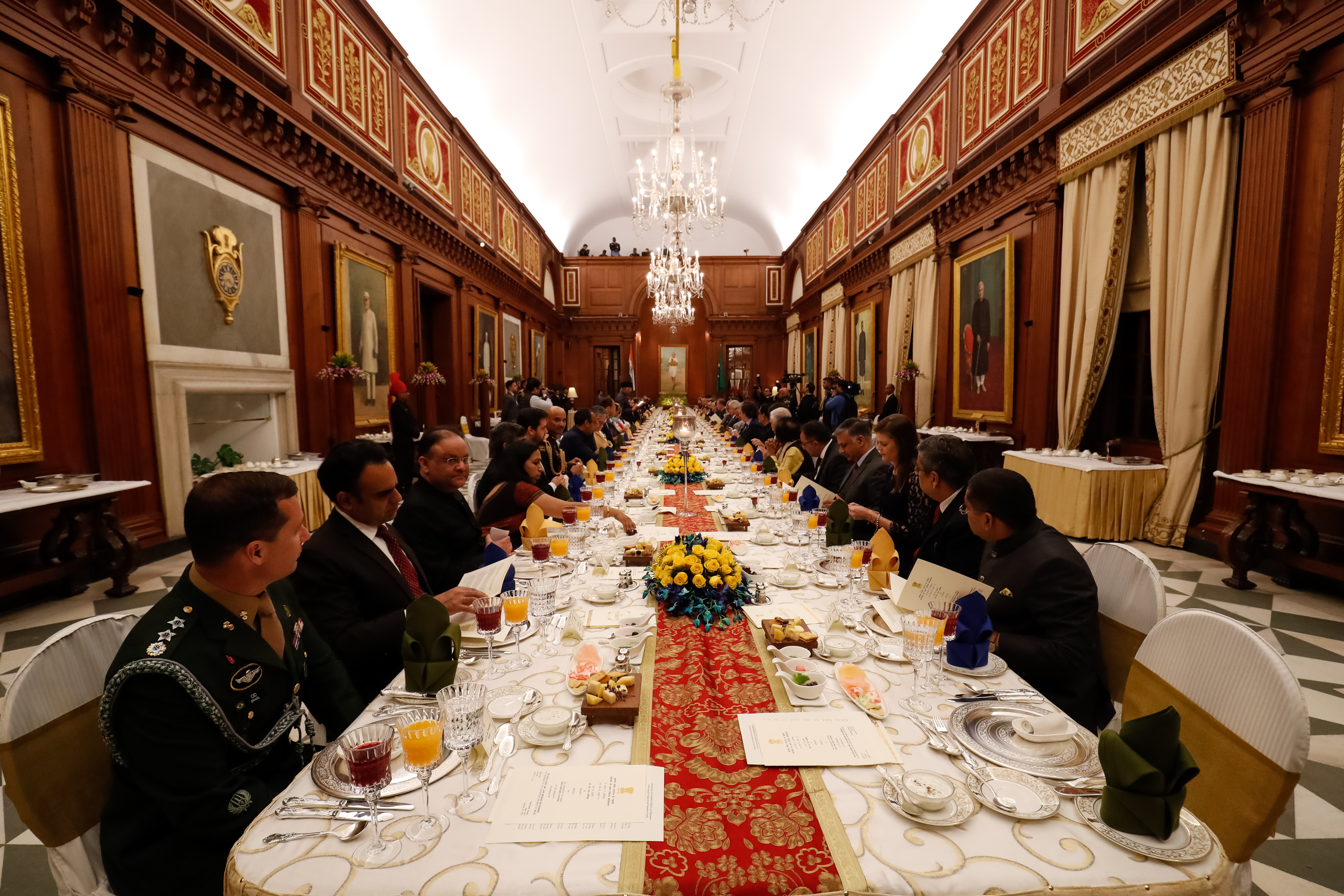
A banquet at the President's House

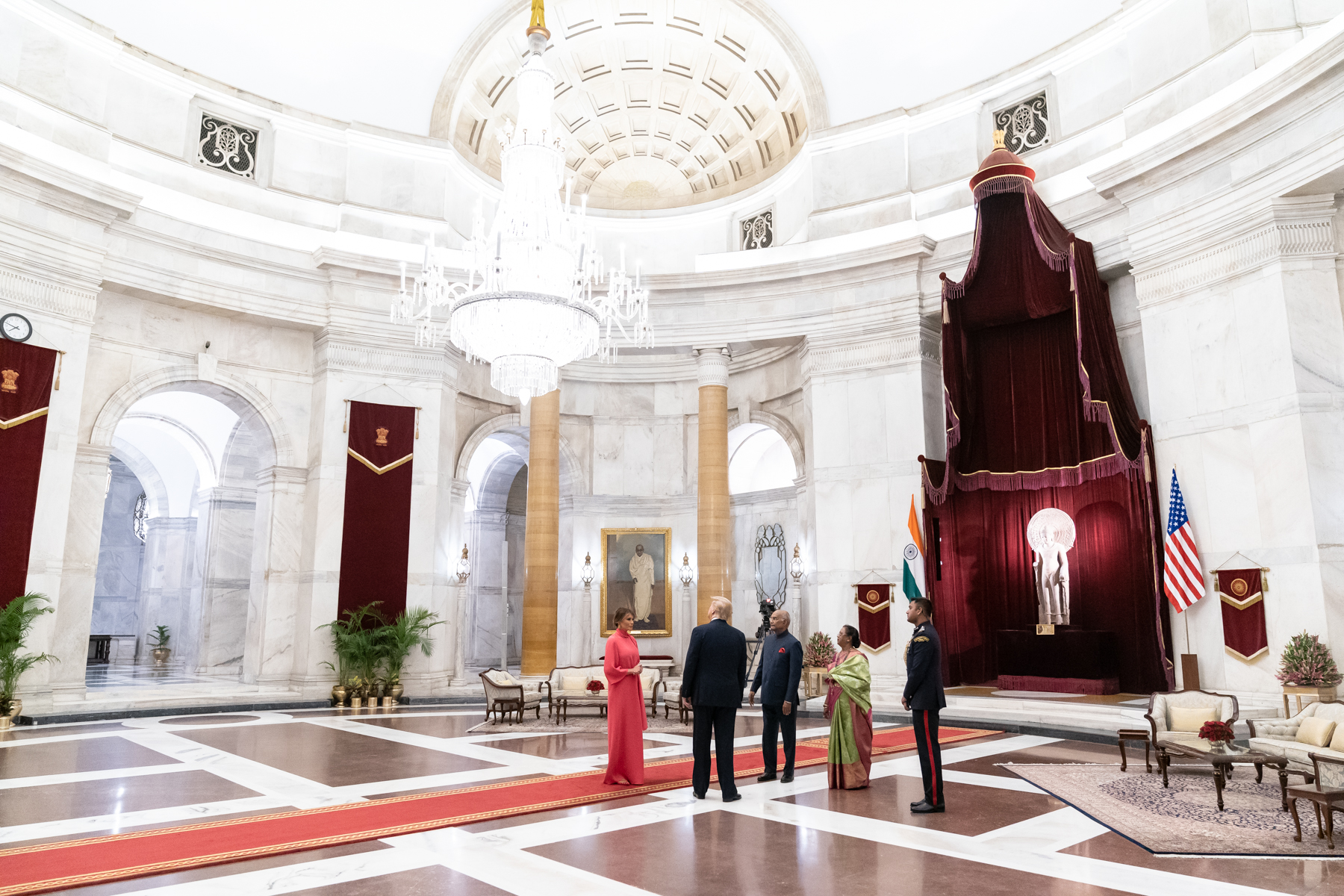
US president Donald Trump at Rashtrapati Bhavan

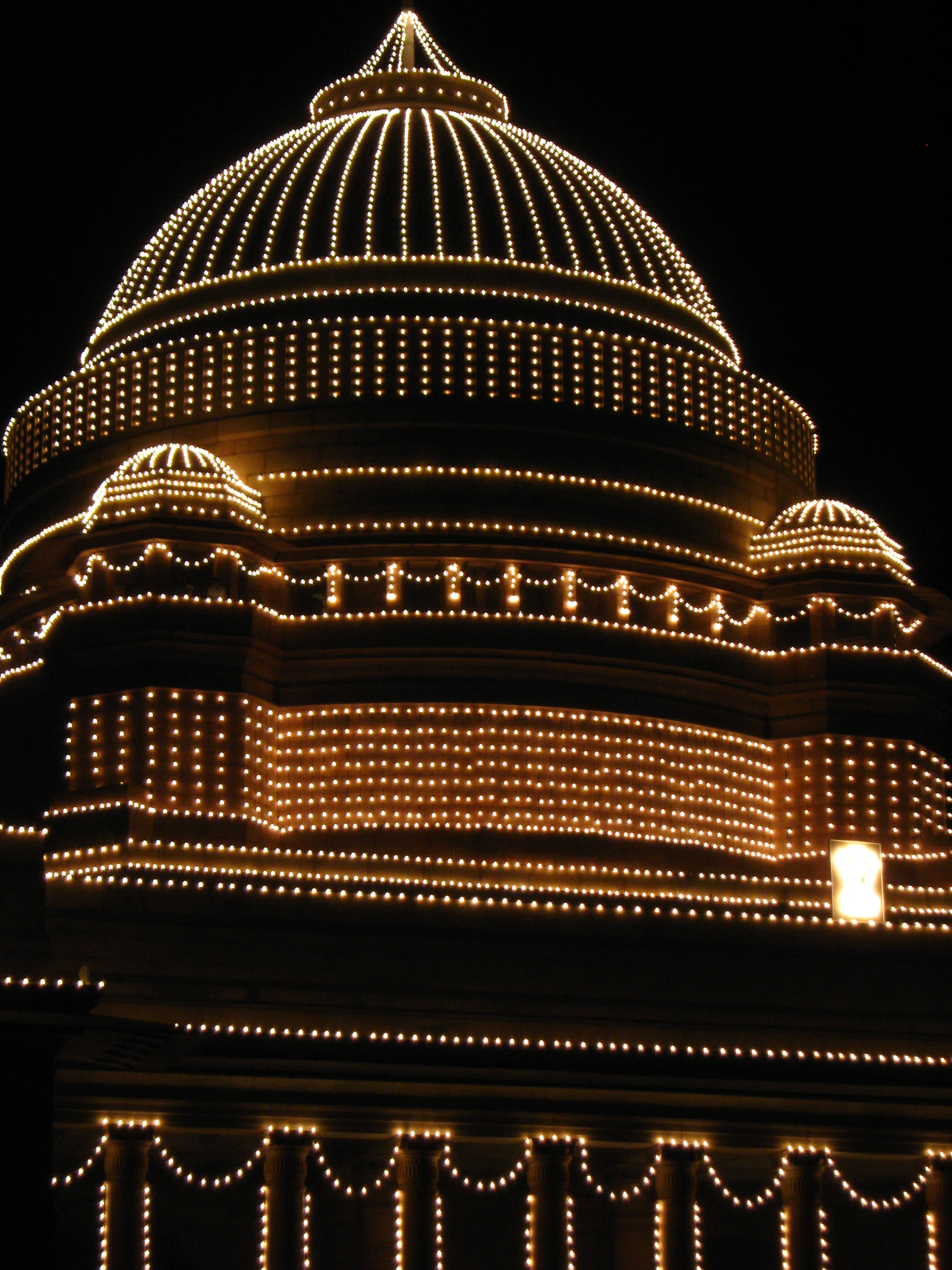
Rashtrapati Bhavan illuminated on Indian Republic Day

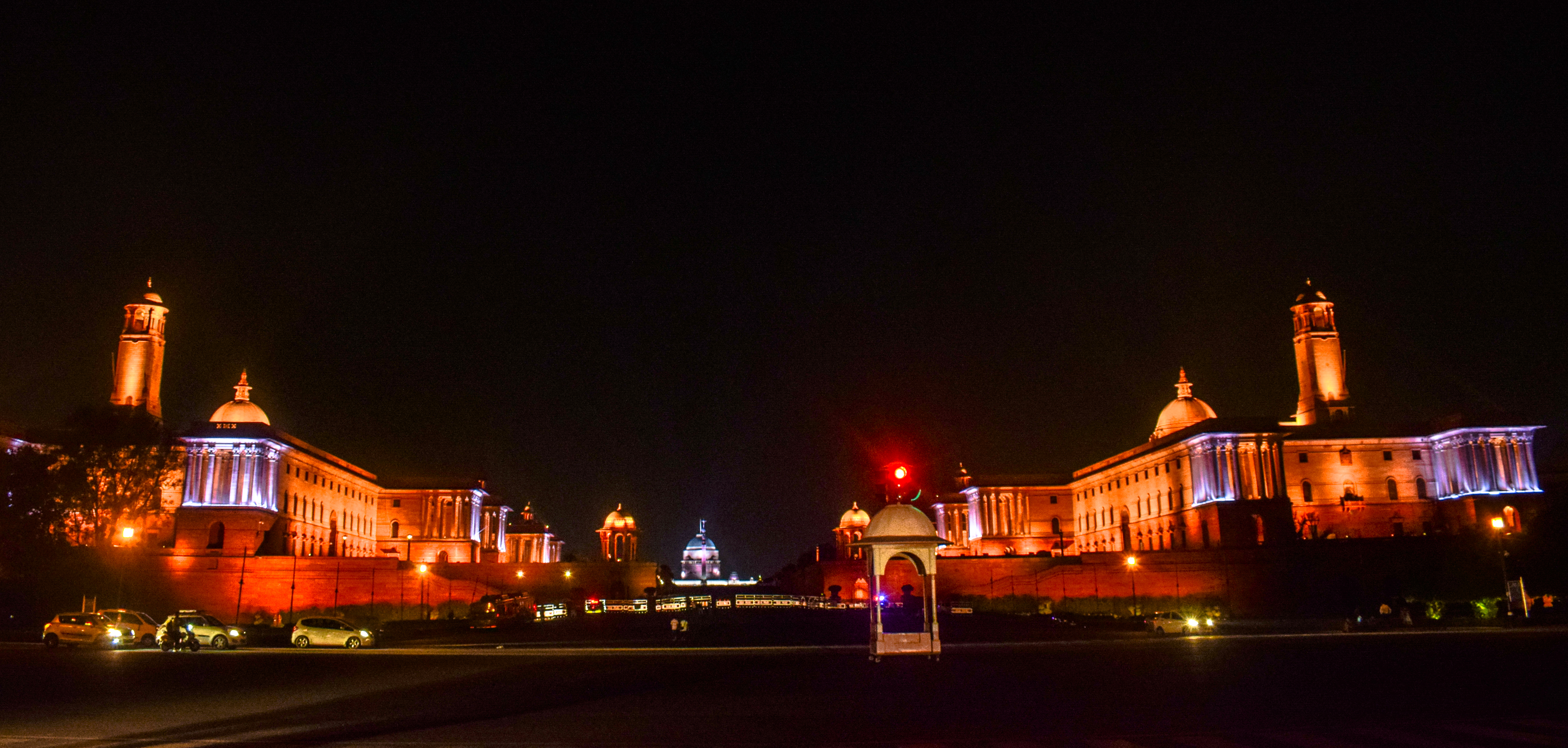
Rashtrapati Bhavan night view
Visuals of Rashtrapati Bhavan

== See also ==
- List of official residences of India
- Rashtrapati Niwas
- Rashtrapati Nilayam
- Rashtrapati Niketan
- Rashtrapati Bhavan Museum
