= Jaipur Column =

Monument in New Delhi

Coordinates: 28.614262°N 77.201902°E

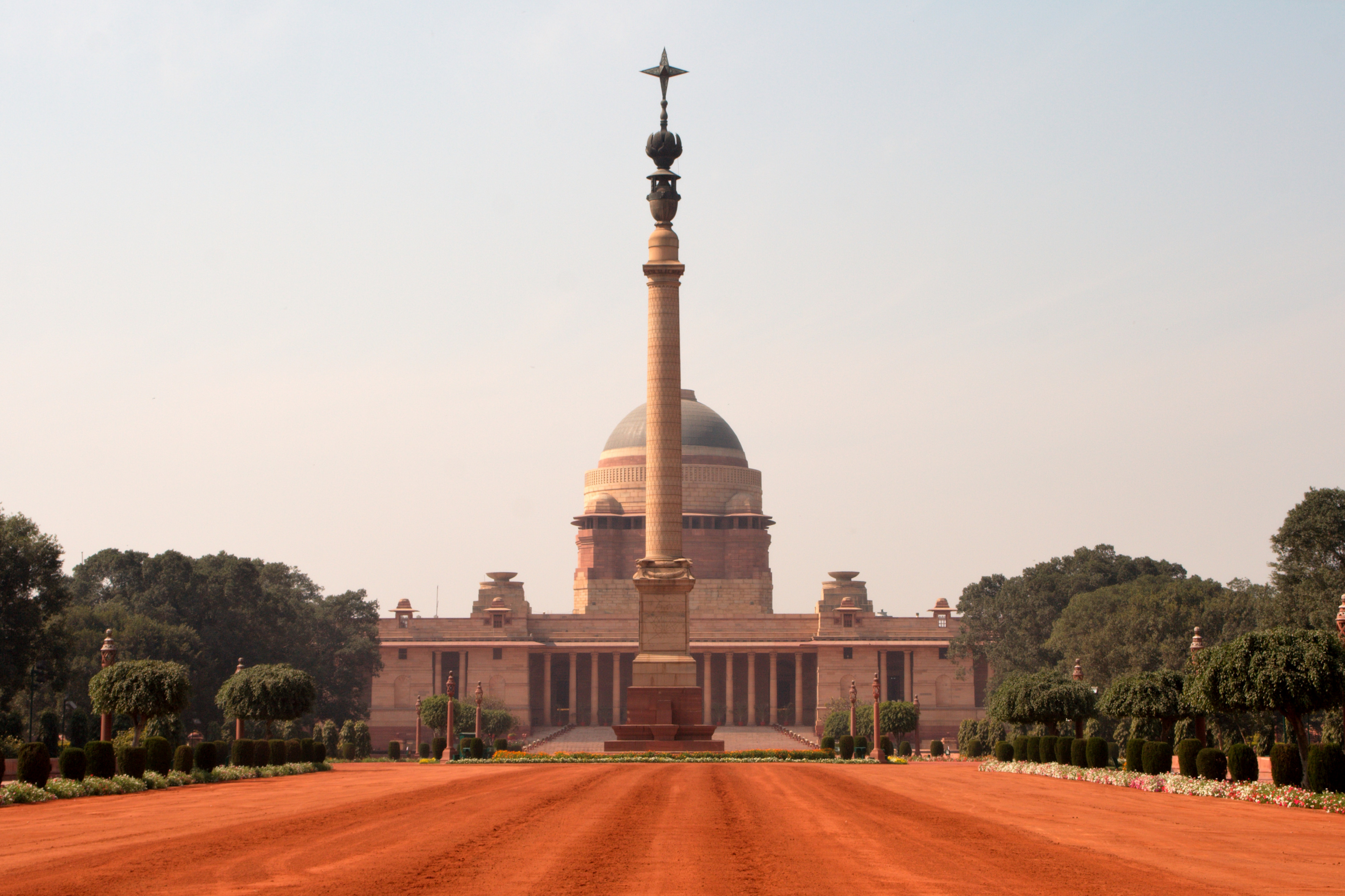
Jaipur Column as seen from the Iron Gate with Rashtrapati Bhavan (Behind).

The Jaipur Column is a monumental column in the middle of the courtyard in front of Rashtrapati Bhavan, the presidential residence in New Delhi, Delhi, India. In 1912 Madho Singh II, the Maharaja of Jaipur, offered to sponsor its construction to commemorate the 1911 Delhi Durbar and the transfer of the capital of India from Calcutta to New Delhi.

The column was designed by the architect Sir Edwin Lutyens. In 1920, Lutyens submitted his design for the column to the Royal Academy of Arts in London, as his diploma work for his election as a fellow of the academy. The structure was completed in 1930, it was contracted by Sir Sobha Singh.

The column is predominantly made of cream sandstone, with red sandstone used for the base. At the top there is an egg surmounted by a bronze lotus flower and a six-pointed glass star. These are supported by a steel shaft running through the column's entire length. Different sources give the height as 145 feet (44 m) or 148 feet (45 m).

There are bas-reliefs around the base, designed by the British sculptor Charles Sargeant Jagger. Jagger also designed the elephants carved into the walls around the courtyard, as well as the statue of George V, Emperor of India which formerly stood under the canopy next to India Gate.

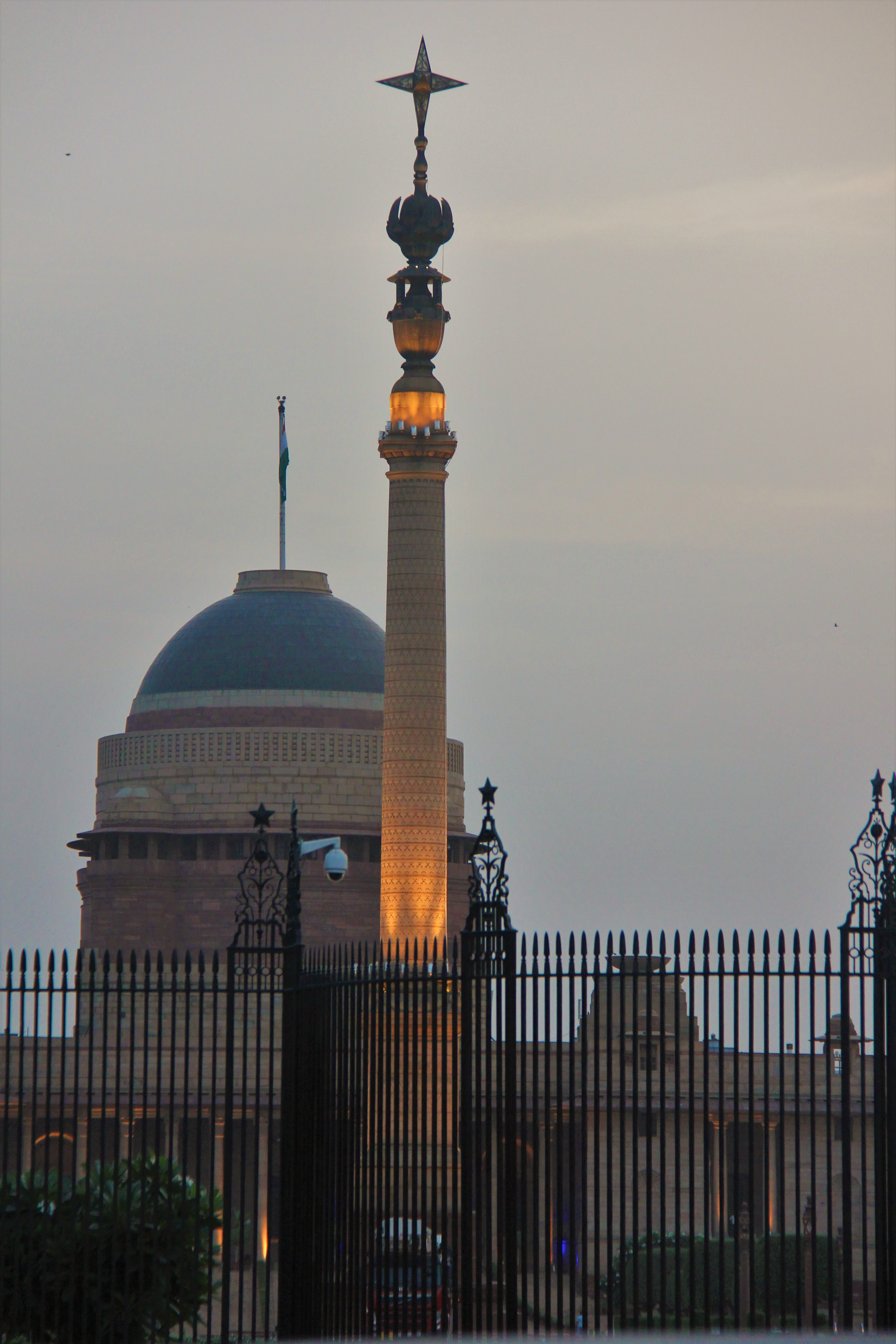
Evening view with light display

On the base there is an inscription, with wording supplied by Lord Irwin, the Viceroy of India:

In thought faith
In word wisdom
In deed courage
In life service
So may India be great

This was a modification of the wording originally proposed by Lutyens:

Endow your thought with faith
Your deed with courage
Your life with sacrifice
So all men may know
The greatness of India

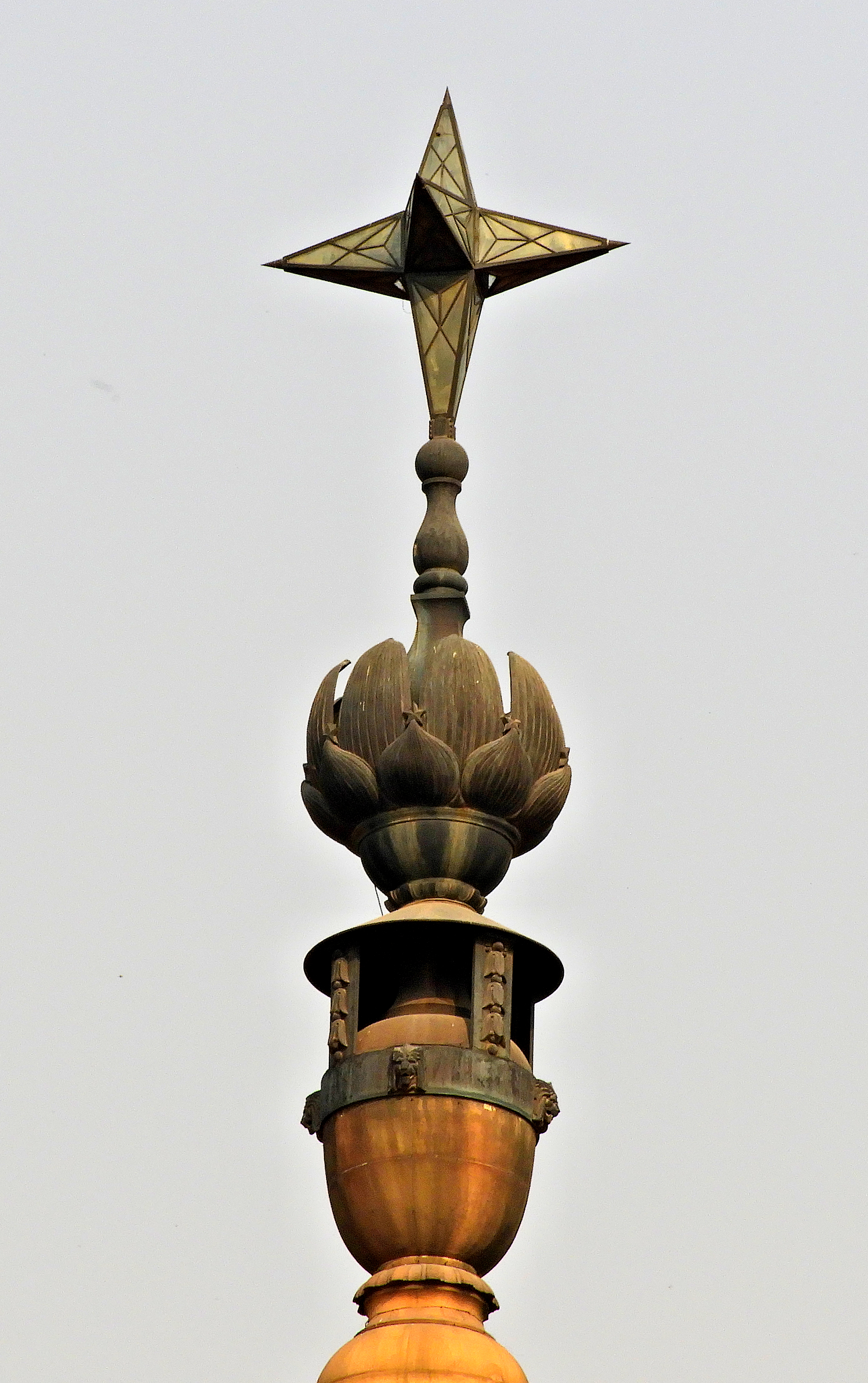
An egg surmounted by a bronze lotus flower and a six-pointed glass Star of India emblem

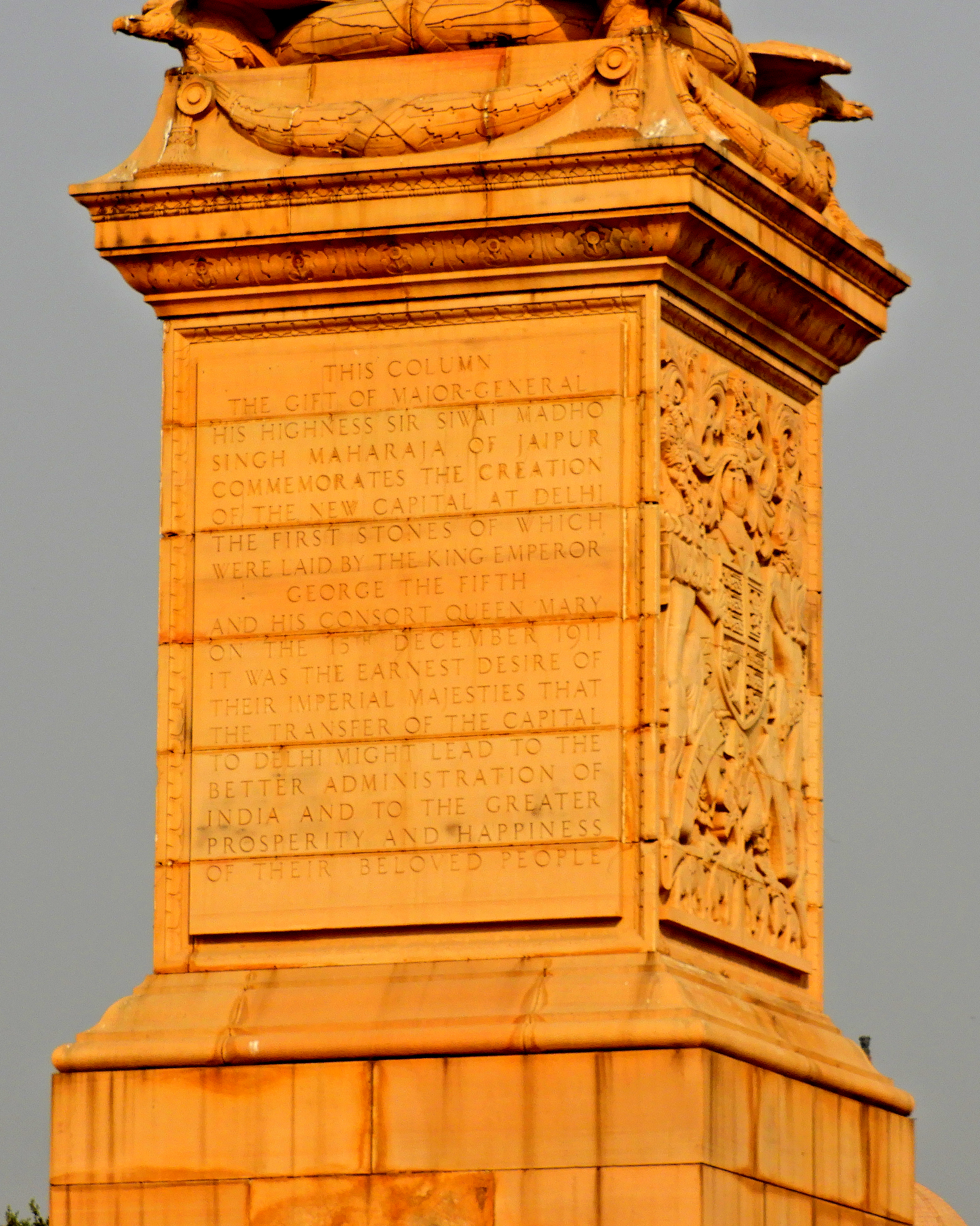
The first stones were led by The king Emperor George The Fifth and his consort Queen Mary on the 15 December 1911

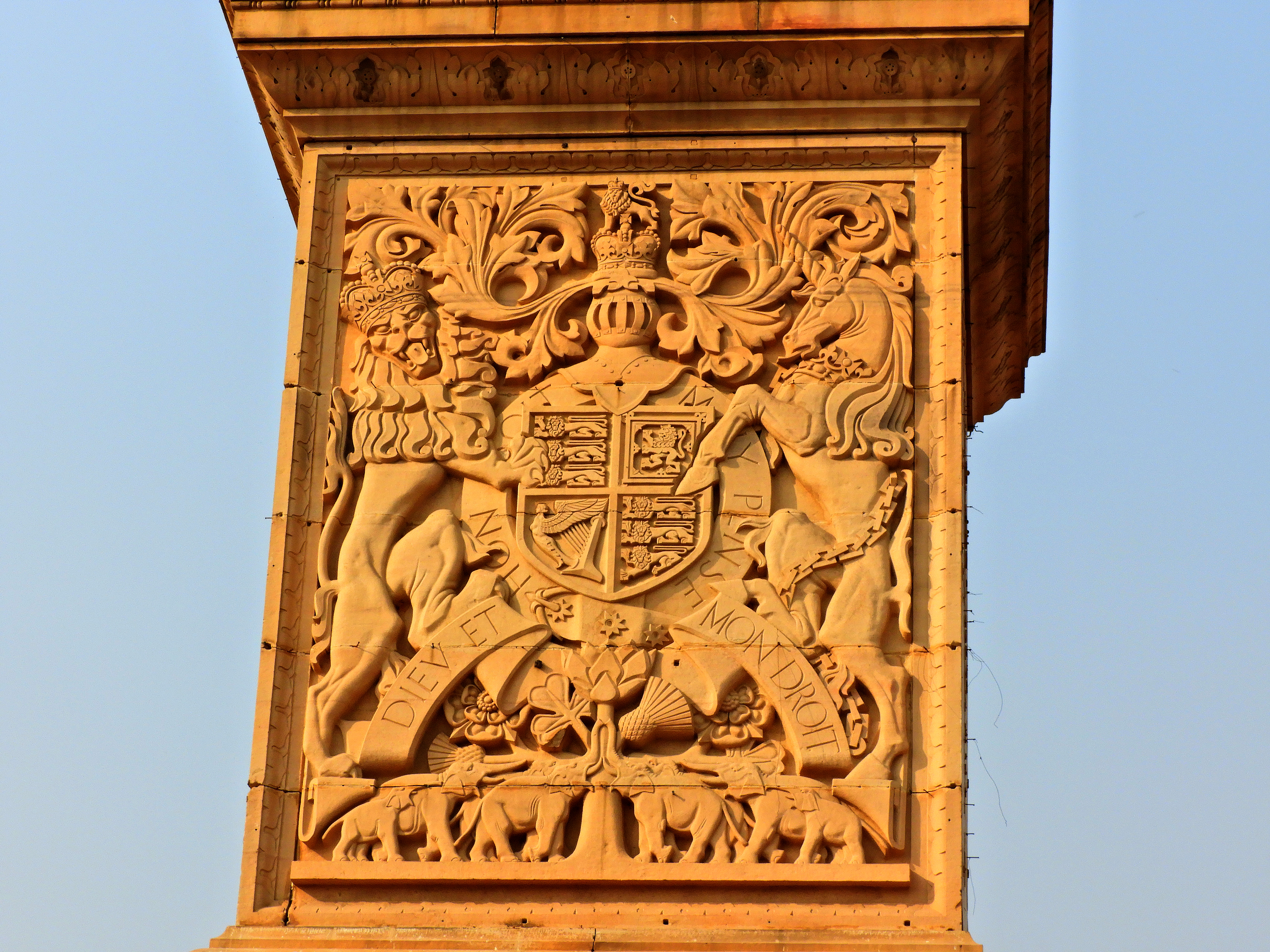
Bas-reliefs around the base showing the coat of arms of the Emperor of India, designed by the British sculptor Charles Sargeant Jagger

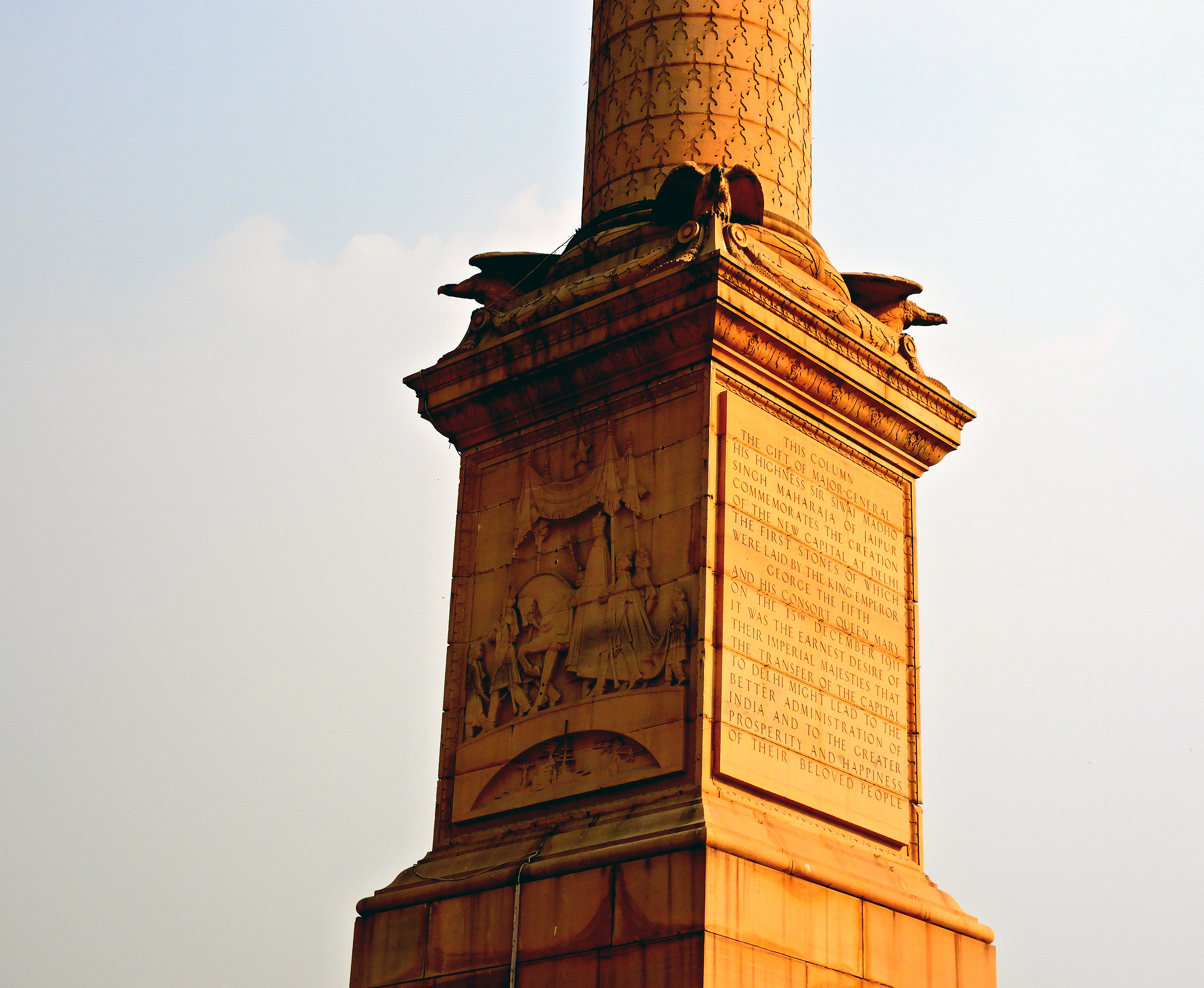
As per writeup on the column-Madho Singh II, the Maharaja of Jaipur, offered to sponsor its construction to commemorate the 1911 Delhi Durbar and the transfer of the capital of India from Calcutta to Delhi
