= Tommaso Colonnello =

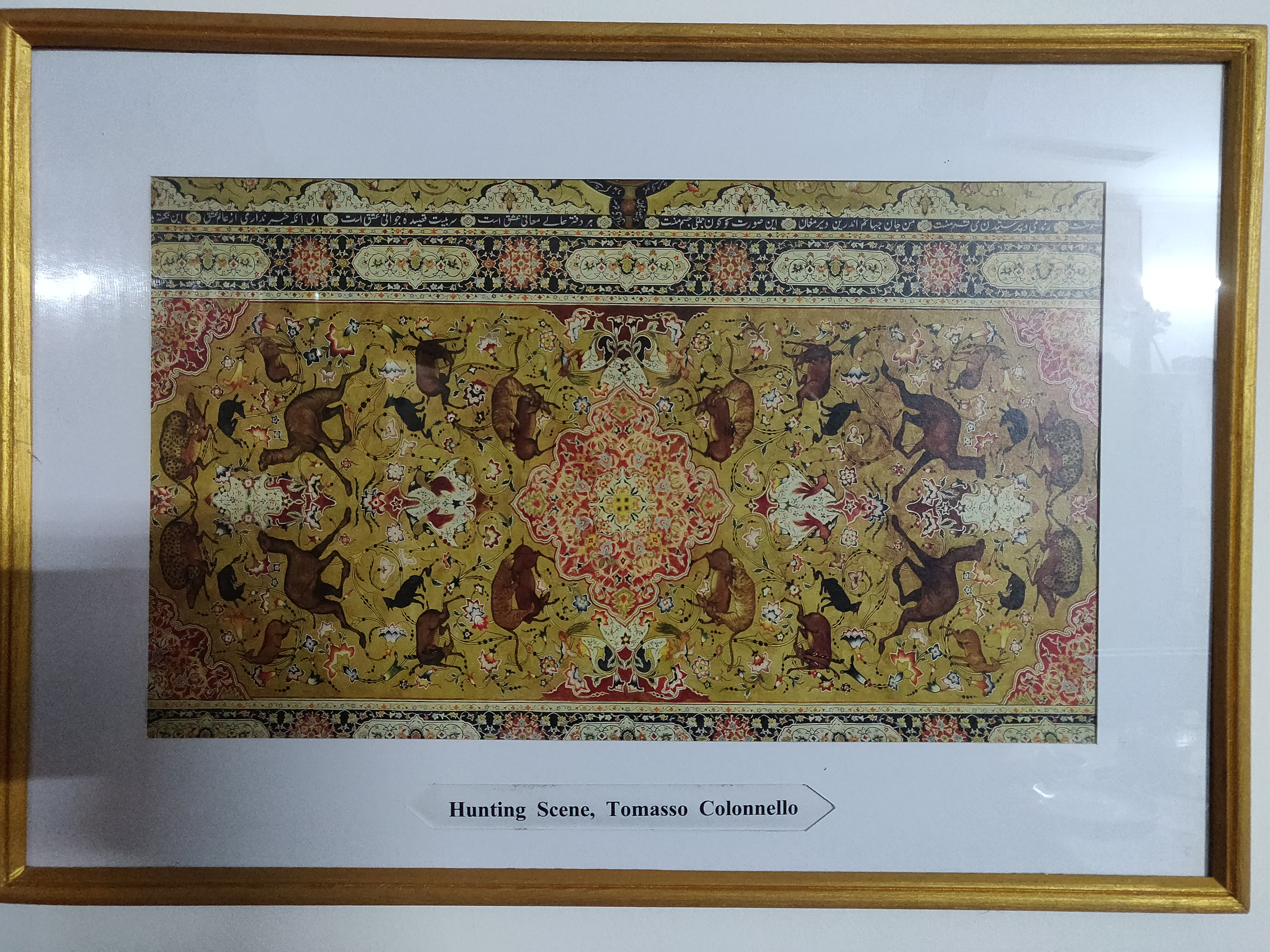
Hunting Scene by Tommaso Colonnello.

Tommaso Colonnello (Buenos Aires, September 9, 1896 – Ortona, Italy, June 20, 1975) was an Italian painter known particularly for paintings executed in the 1930s for the British viceroy's palace in India. Especially for these works he received the honor of knighthood from Vittorio Emanuele King of Italy.

== Biography ==
Tommaso Colonnello was born in Buenos Aires on September 9, 1896, belonging to a family from Ortona, Italy, that had been trading with India since the early 1800s. The family moved to Bombay when Tommaso was still 12, and he attended St. Mary's Jesuit College. After completing his studies, at age 18 he returned to Italy and fought in World War I. When the war was over he married Clementina Costanzo, and with his wife left for New York, where he devoted himself to the study of Oriental art and decoration. For some years he learned the use of Lacquer painting from Chinese masters. Then with the onset of the Depression he moved to India where he received a major commission: the decoration of the ballroom of the Rashtrapati Bhavan, palace of the viceroy in New Delhi. This work was completed in 1933 with the help of 12 Indian painters. Due to the praise he received from critics for this work, the King of Italy gave him a 'knighthood for "artistic works ... performed abroad."

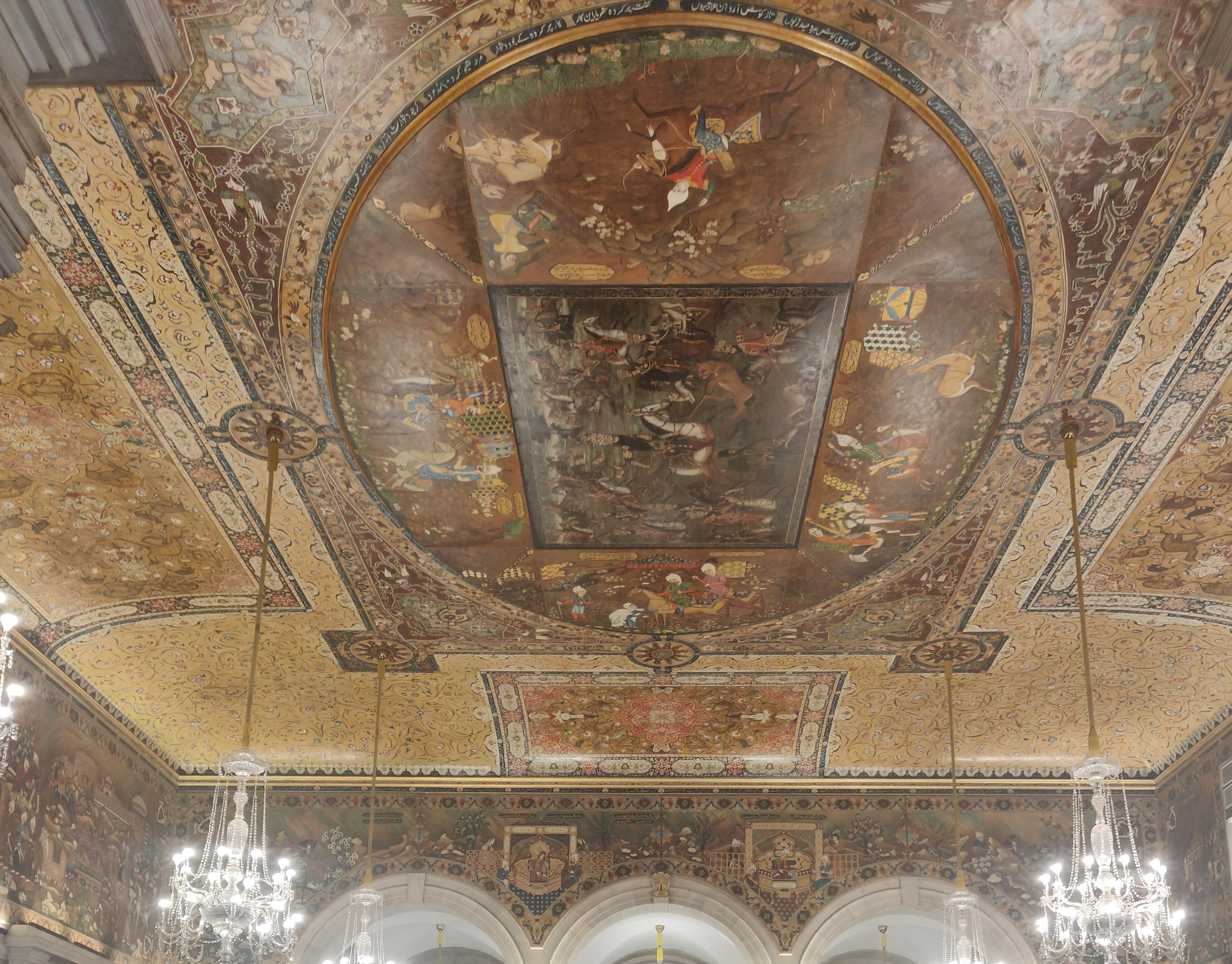
Ceiling of Rashtrapati Bhavan's ball room decorated by Tommaso Colonnello

In 1938 he moved to Milan with his wife and two daughters. In Italy, however, his art was not as successful, and after World War II he moved to Buenos Aires where he had good success. He later returned to Italy where he continued to produce his artwork in Ortona until his death on June 20, 1975.

== Citations in India ==
In a book commissioned by the president of the republic of India on the history of the viceroy's palace in 2002, an Indian art historian mentions the artist's name as Tomasso. From the name thusly changed he is mentioned in other Indian references, as well as can be seen on the captions of prints and articles in India.
