= Amrit Udyan =

Garden in New Delhi

Amrit Udyan is the 15-acre botanical garden located within the official presidential estate of India, the Rashtrapati Bhavan, in New Delhi.

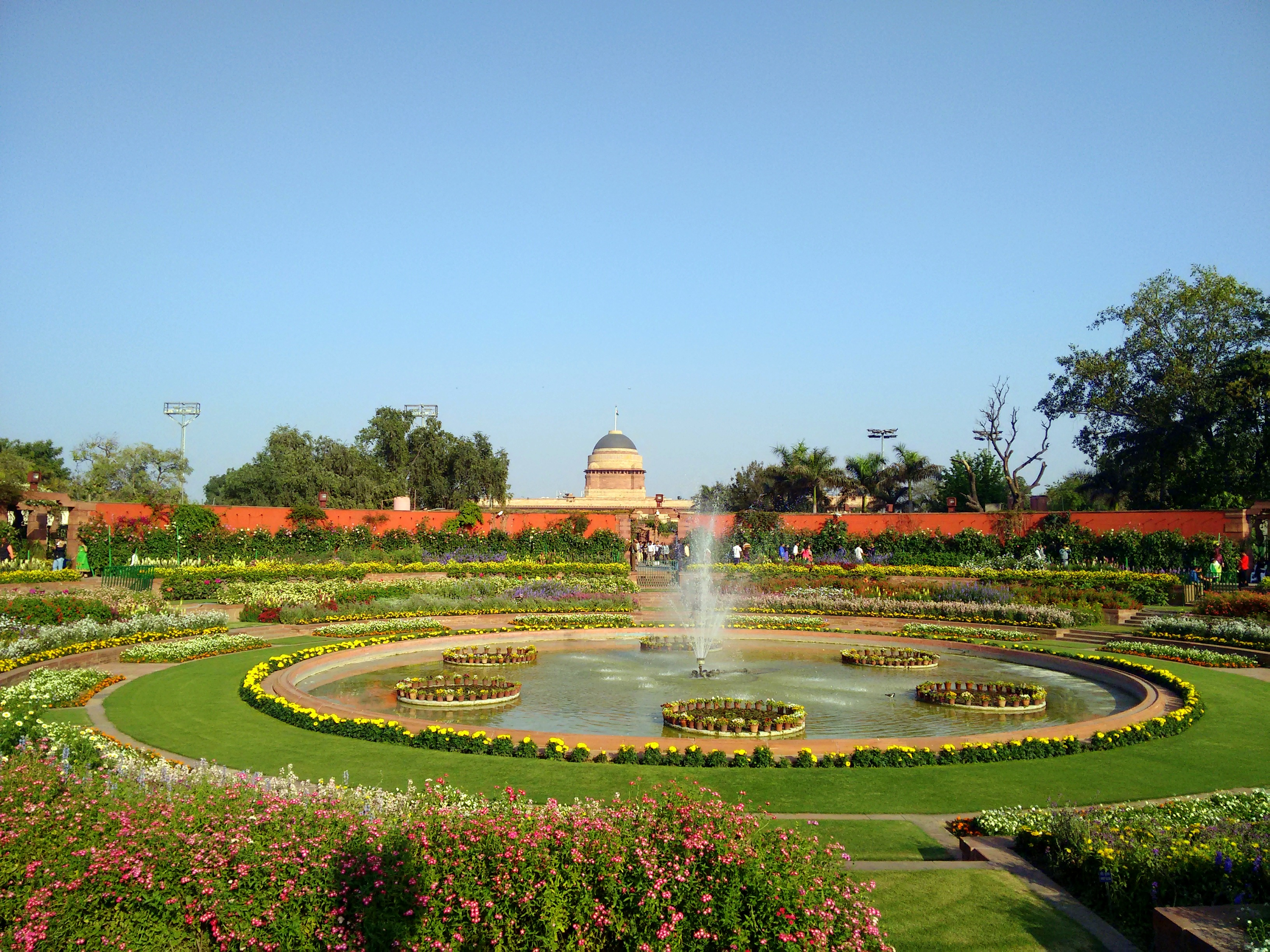
Amrit Udyan, Rashtrapathi Bhawan

== Gallery ==
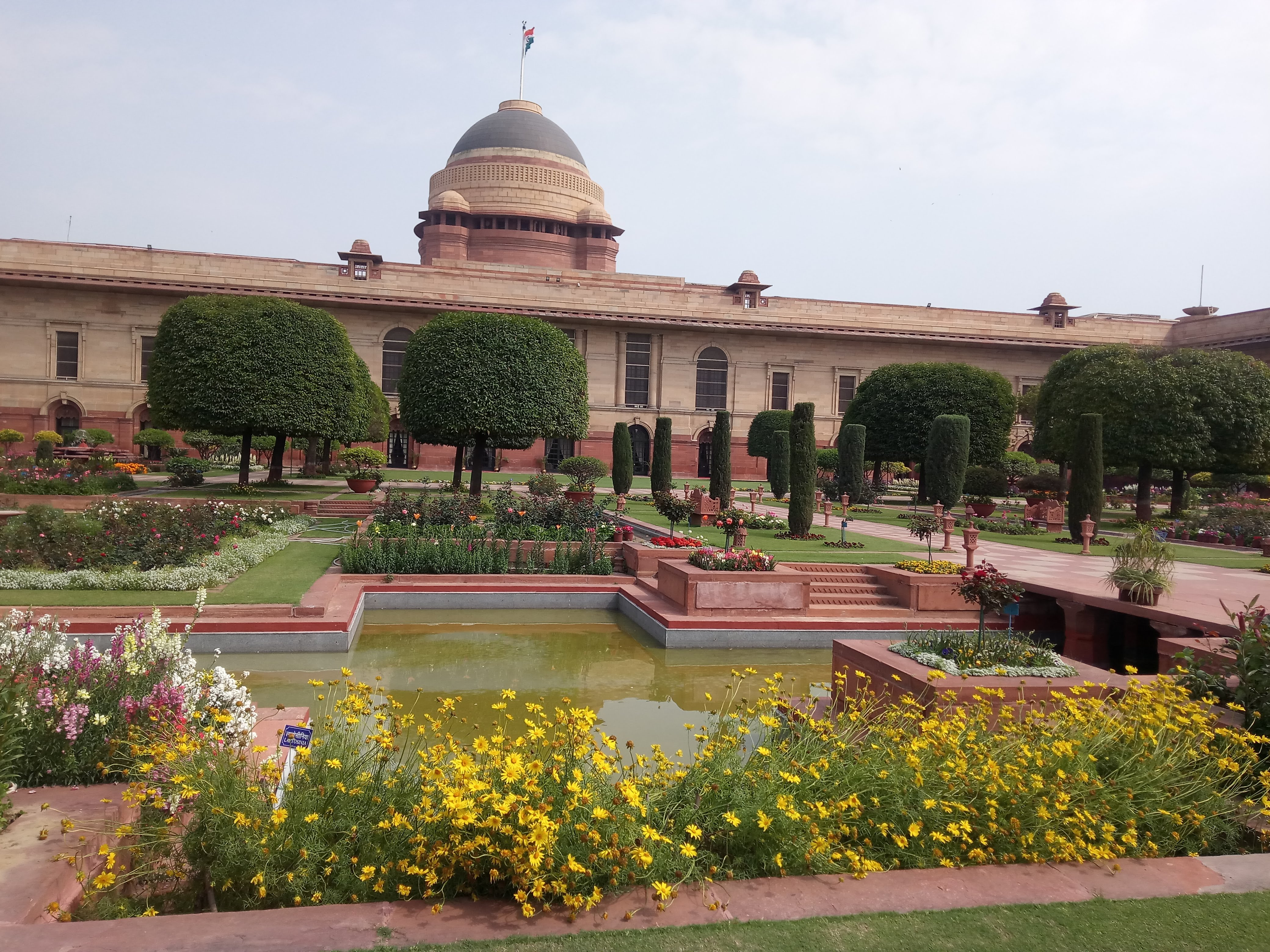

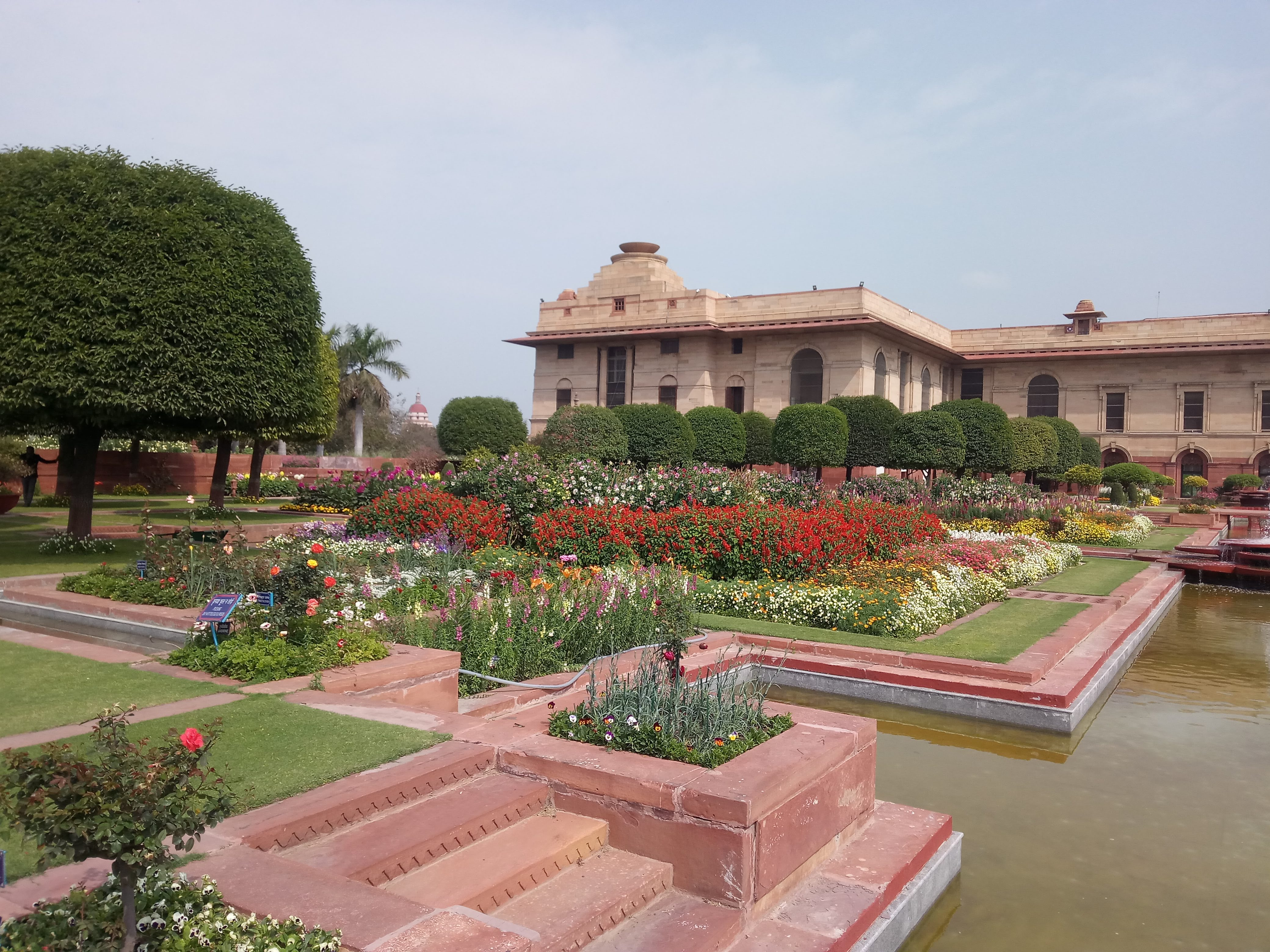
